= Timeline of 1960s counterculture =

The following is a timeline of 1960s counterculture. Influential events and milestones years before and after the 1960s are included for context relevant to the subject period of the early 1960s through the mid-1970s.

== 1950s ==
=== 1951 ===
- The True Believer: "Longshoreman-philosopher" Eric Hoffer's Thoughts on the Nature of Mass Movements is published.
- July 16: The Catcher in the Rye by J.D. Salinger is published.

=== 1952 ===
- August: Mad magazine debuts as a comic book before adopting a standard magazine format in 1955. The publication satirizes both mainstream American culture and, later, counterculture alike.
- Invisible Man: Ralph Ellison's novel of African-American life in the 20th century is published.
- Go: John Clellon Holmes' novel is published and is later considered to be the first book depicting the Beat Generation.

=== 1953 ===
- April 13: Project MKUltra, the Central Intelligence Agency's behavior control research program that grew to include testing the effects of LSD and extended sensory deprivation on both volunteer and unsuspecting American and Canadian subjects into the 1960s, commences. Secret detention camps in Europe and Asia are also set up for torture and experiments on prisoners.
- May 4: The "doors of perception" open for author Aldous Huxley as he takes mescaline for the first time. Humphrey Osmond guides the trip, and later correspondence between the two produces the term psychedelic.
- December: Marilyn Monroe centerfold: the first issue of Playboy magazine appears, published by Hugh Hefner.

=== 1954 ===
- May 17: Brown vs. Board of Education: The U.S. Supreme Court rules unanimously that the practice of racial segregation in public schools, mostly by Southern states, is unconstitutional. The doctrine of "Separate but Equal" as a moral or legal pretext for segregation is decreed no longer enforceable by governments, and the process of true racial integration begins in schools throughout the region, a process that was not completed until about 1970.

=== 1955 ===
- February: SEATO: The Southeast Asia Treaty Organization is formally activated, nominally obligating the U.S. to intervene as part of a collective action in case of military conflagrations in the region. The non-binding SEATO commitment, however, is not invoked as the justification for involvement in Vietnam by future President Lyndon Baines Johnson (LBJ) until later escalation of hostilities there proves unpopular.
- July 9: "Rock Around the Clock": Pennsylvania country singer Bill Haley's version of the keystone song begins an eight-week run at number 1 on the Billboard charts. With deep roots in black jazz, blues, and R&B, as well as gospel and country music, the rock & roll era begins.
- August 28: Emmett Till murder: A black adolescent is brutally slain by white vigilantes in rural Mississippi after allegedly flirting with a white woman. The incident becomes a pivotal event in the growing civil rights movement after Till's mother allows the boy's mutilated body to be viewed in an open-casket funeral, and after two white men (who years later confess to the murder) are acquitted by an all-white, all-male jury, the standard practice for that time in most of the country, and especially the South. In 2017, Till's apparently coerced female accuser recanted key testimony she gave under oath; the woman died in 2023.
- September 30: James Dean: The star of Rebel without a Cause and early icon of the disaffected generation dies in a sports car crash at age 24 at Cholame, California.
- October 7: Six Gallery Reading: Beat poet Allen Ginsberg first performs his soon-to-be scandalous Howl.
- October 26: The Village Voice: One of the earliest and most enduring alternative newspapers is launched by Ed Fancher, Dan Wolf, John Wilcock and Norman Mailer in New York City. The paper ceased publication in 2018, but pledged to digitize its vast archive.
- December 1: Following Claudette Colvin's similar action nine-months earlier, activist Rosa Parks refuses to cede her seat on a public bus to a white passenger in Montgomery, Alabama (per Southern segregationist mores and codes), and is arrested. A successful bus boycott by local blacks led by Dr. Martin Luther King Jr., pastor of that city's Dexter Avenue Baptist Church, ensues, while the American Civil Liberties Union takes on and wins Parks' legal case. After over a year of blacks refusing to ride, the U.S. Supreme Court Browder v. Gayle result orders the desegregation of Montgomery's bus system.

=== 1956 ===
- April 21: "Heartbreak Hotel": Elvis Presley's first number-one hit tops the popular music charts for eight weeks. The Mississippi-born singer who was working as a truck driver in Memphis, Tennessee creates teenage pandemonium in households throughout the U.S. and subsequently across the rest of the western world.
- August: The FBI's COINTELPRO domestic counterintelligence program commences. The surveillance effort is initially directed against stateside communist activities, but grows to include illegal invasions of privacy targeting civil rights and anti-war activists, particularly black activists.

=== 1957 ===
- Masters and Johnson begin scientific research into human sexual response in the Department of Obstetrics and Gynecology at Washington University School of Medicine. The first of many widely read books regarding their research is published in 1966.
- January 10: The Southern Christian Leadership Conference (SCLC) civil rights organization is formed in Atlanta, Georgia.
- September 5: On the Road: Years in the works, a somewhat tamed version of Jack Kerouac's seminal novel of the Beat Generation is published.
- September 23: US President Dwight D. Eisenhower signs an executive order sending federal troops to maintain peace and order during the racial integration of Central High School in Little Rock, Arkansas. His main antagonist is Arkansas governor Orval Faubus.
- October 4: The western world is shocked and deeply fearful when the Soviet Union launches Sputnik 1, the first artificial space satellite. The ability to launch a satellite equates to the ability to launch an intercontinental ballistic missile, thereby directly threatening much of the world with long-range missile attack for the first time. Confidence is further shaken in December, when Vanguard, the rushed U.S. attempt to equal Sputnik, explodes on the launchpad.
- November 15: Albert Schweitzer, Coretta Scott King, and Benjamin Spock place a large advertisement in The New York Times calling for an end to the nuclear arms race. This leads to the creation of SANE, the Committee for a SANE Nuclear Policy.

=== 1958 ===
- February 17: The Campaign for Nuclear Disarmament is inaugurated in London, introducing the "Peace symbol" from semaphore signs for the letters C, N, and D.
- March 24: Elvis Presley, by then the biggest recording star in the world, is inducted into the U.S. Army. Presley serves his two years honorably.
- April 2: Herb Caen of the San Francisco Chronicle coins the term beatnik to refer to aficionados of the Beat Generation.
- April 4–7: Over the Easter weekend, in London's Trafalgar Square, thousands protest in the first major Aldermaston march, organised by the Direct Action Committee Against Nuclear War and supported by CND. The protests are accompanied by a festival with jazz and skiffle bands.
- SANE claims 25,000 members in 130 chapters.
- The SLATE student political party, which resembles what later came to be termed the "New Left," is formed at the University of California, Berkeley.
- Eisenhower is the first U.S. president to ask a joint session of Congress to pass the long-debated Equal Rights Amendment.
- The Affluent Society: Harvard economist John Kenneth Galbraith's highly influential work is published.

=== 1959 ===
- January 1: Revolutionary forces under the leadership of Fidel Castro overthrow the corrupt Batista government in Cuba. Fifty years of repressive rule by the future Soviet ally ensue before Castro relinquishes control to his brother.
- February 3: The Day the Music Died: Early rock stars Buddy Holly, Ritchie Valens and The Big Bopper are killed along with the pilot of a small plane in bad weather near Clear Lake, Iowa. Guitarist Tommy Allsup "loses" his seat after a coin-flip with Valens, and Holly's bass player (and future country music legend) Waylon Jennings also misses the doomed flight when he allows the ill "Bopper" to take his seat. In 1972, Don McLean's "American Pie," a commemoration of the incident, is released, and is later called "the accessible farewell to the Fifties and Sixties."
- How to Speak Hip: Improv pioneers Del Close and John Brent's satirical comedy record is released and formalizes hip parlance for a generation.

== 1960s ==
=== 1960 ===
- The Student League for Industrial Democracy changes its name to Students for a Democratic Society (SDS) and first meets in Ann Arbor, Michigan. SDS dissociates itself from LID in 1965, and becomes the most notable radical student political organization of the counterculture era.
- A beatnik community in Cornwall, UK noted for wearing their hair past their shoulders, and including a young Wizz Jones, is interviewed by Alan Whicker for BBC television.
- Harvard University lecturer Timothy Leary and assistant professor Richard Alpert begin experimenting with hallucinogens at Cambridge, Massachusetts. The highly controversial Leary soon becomes the most notable advocate of LSD use during the era.
- February 1: The first of the Greensboro sit-ins in North Carolina sparks a wave of similar protests against segregation at Woolworth and other retail store lunch counters across the American South.
- March 26: Governor Buford Ellington of Tennessee orders an investigation into a CBS news crew that filmed a Nashville sit-in.
- April: The Student Nonviolent Coordinating Committee (SNCC) is organized by Ella Baker at Shaw University in Raleigh, North Carolina.
- May 1: U-2 Incident: a U.S. spy plane searching for Soviet nuclear installations is shot down deep within the U.S.S.R. Presumed dead by the U.S., the CIA pilot Francis Gary Powers is captured alive and paraded in the Russian press after the White House enlists NASA in a botched and quickly exposed deception claiming that the plane went missing during a weather flight.
- May 9: The Pill: The U.S. Food & Drug Administration approves the use of the first reliable form of birth control: a 99%-effective pill. The Sexual revolution commences, at first in the bedrooms of married couples.
- May 13: Anti-HUAC protest in San Francisco: 400 police using fire hoses force a student "mob" out of a House Un-American Activities Committee hearing at City Hall in San Francisco. The counterculture era of student political protest, outside of the ongoing civil rights movement, begins.
- May 19: SANE, the Committee for a SANE Nuclear Policy, holds an anti-nuclear arms race rally at Madison Square Garden in New York City, attended by 20,000 people.
- July 11: To Kill A Mockingbird: Harper Lee's Pulitzer Prize-winning story of racial inequality is published and becomes a classic of American literature. The story is adapted into a movie in 1962.
- October 21: Publication of Paul Goodman's Growing Up Absurd, a deeply critical examination of American society, which Goodman held responsible for the widespread sense of alienation among American youth. The book was widely read by college students and young activists throughout the Sixties, and Goodman was invited to speak at hundreds of colleges.
- November 8: John F. Kennedy is elected 35th president of the United States, defeating sitting Vice President Richard Nixon in what is considered to be the closest and most intellectually charged US presidential election since 1916. Nearly 70 million ballots are cast, but the margin of victory is approximately 100,000 votes.

=== 1961 ===
- January: Look Magazine journalist George Leonard writes about "Youth of the Sixties: The Explosive Generation" and predicts that the "quiet generation" of the 1950s "is rumbling and is going to explode".
- January 17: U.S. President (and retired 5-Star Army General) Dwight Eisenhower gives his farewell address to the nation, and uses much of his time to warn of the undue influence of the "military–industrial complex".
- January 20: In a powerful inaugural address, new U.S. President Kennedy calls upon citizens to "ask not what your country can do for you–-ask what you can do for your country".
- March 1: Kennedy signs an executive order creating the Peace Corps.
- March 28: Although he supported the program during the 1960 campaign, Kennedy orders final cancellation of full production of the oft-resurrected USAF B-70 Bomber program, in a significant attempted to control the nuclear arms race.
- March 30: The United Nations Single Convention on Narcotic Drugs is signed in New York City, tightening controls on international trade in opiates.
- April 12: Vostok: Man in Space: The Western world is again shocked when the Soviet Union follows its Sputnik triumph by putting the first human in space, Yuri Gagarin.
- April 17: Bay of Pigs: A secret CIA-led invasion force intent on overthrowing Communist dictator Fidel Castro lands on a remote beach in Cuba. Anti-Castro Cuban expatriates and CIA mercenaries are overtaken and captured by Cuban forces. President Kennedy attempts to cut losses and refuses to provide additional U.S. air support, dooming the operation.
- May 4: Freedom Riders: Civil rights activists travel on public buses and trains across the American South to personally confront and challenge segregation.
- June 4: Kennedy meets with Soviet Premier Nikita Khrushchev in Vienna, and reports no progress on issues concerning a partitioned Germany. Another Berlin Crisis ensues.
- July: Amnesty International is formed in London after British attorney Peter Benenson is outraged by the arrest of two students who raise a toast to freedom in Portugal. The human rights organization wins the Nobel Peace Prize in 1977.
- August 13: Berlin Wall: To stem the massive tide of emigration from the Communist East into the democratic West (200,000 escape East Germany in 1960 alone), the construction of a wall dividing the city of Berlin begins under Soviet direction.
- October 25: U.S. and Soviet tanks face off at Checkpoint Charlie in Berlin.
- November 1: Women Strike for Peace: 50,000 women march in 60 cities throughout the U.S. to demonstrate against nuclear weapons.
- November 30: Cuban Project: Aggressive covert operations against Fidel Castro's revolutionary rule in Cuba are authorized by President Kennedy and soon implemented under the direction of his brother, Attorney General Robert F. Kennedy. Implementation of the plan is highly unorthodox, with command oversight bring given to the new Attorney General, and not career military or intelligence officers.
- December 14: Kennedy signs an executive order establishing the Presidential Commission on the Status of Women.

=== 1962 ===
- January: Black is Beautiful: The African Jazz-Art Society stages "Naturally '62," a fashion show in Harlem, popularizing the phrase which would become important to the culture of the civil rights movement.
- January 12: Operation Chopper: U.S. forces participate in major combat in Vietnam for the first time.
- January 18: Operation Ranch Hand: The U.S. military begins the use of extremely toxic and carcinogenic defoliants in Vietnam. Use of the dioxin-containing Agent Orange begins in 1965. Agent Orange has profound effects on large numbers of Vietnam veterans after the war ends.
- March 16: U.S. Defense Secretary Robert McNamara reveals that American troops in Vietnam have engaged in ground combat.
- March 19: Bob Dylan's self-named first album is released. It reaches #13 in the UK, but does not chart on the Billboard 200 in the U.S. Dylan's second album, The Freewheelin' Bob Dylan, makes an enormous impact on the American folk and pop music scenes in 1963.
- March 31: Cesar Chavez begins organizing migrant farm workers in California.
- June 15: The SDS completes the Port Huron Statement, its manifesto calling for participatory democracy and non-violent civil disobedience as well as outlining its perceived problems with modern society.
- July–August: The Albany Movement civil rights protest against segregation is active in Georgia.
- August 4: Film star Marilyn Monroe dies of a barbiturate overdose under suspicious circumstances in Los Angeles. Monroe's death is a precursor to an explosion of recreational use of highly addictive prescription drugs (and thousands of accidental pill overdose deaths) during the counterculture era, even as legitimate use of these drugs is already in decline.
- September 12: John F. Kennedy speaks at Rice University: "... we choose to go to the Moon in this decade and do the other things, not because they are easy, but because they are hard ..."
- September 27: Silent Spring: Following a growing groundswell of reports on the deleterious effects of DDT use on the ecosystem, Rachel Carson's exposé is published and the modern environmental movement begins.
- October 1: Following a riot which leaves 2 dead and over 300 injured on September 30, James Meredith is the first African-American student to enter the University of Mississippi, known popularly as "Ole Miss".
- October 5: "Love Me Do": The Beatles' first single is released in Great Britain. From this modest beginning the group eventually goes on to sell over 600 million records worldwide and remains as of 2023 the best selling musical group of all time. Earlier in the year, Decca Records and other labels chose not to sign the group to a contract.
- October 16–28: The Cuban Missile Crisis brings the world to the brink of nuclear war after the U.S.S.R. attempts to station missiles with nuclear warheads in Cuba. On October 22, President Kennedy bluntly addresses the nation on a matter of "highest national urgency" and discusses the possibility of global nuclear war. Kennedy's generals advise him to invade Cuba, but he orders a naval blockade instead. The Soviets back down and remove the missiles.
- The Esalen Institute is founded in Big Sur, California by Michael Murphy and Dick Price.
- Sex and the Single Girl: Helen Gurley Brown's post-pill career and dating manual becomes a best-seller. Brown's attempted stunt to have the book "banned" for marketing purposes fails, but early sales top two million copies. Brown goes on to edit the influential Cosmopolitan Magazine for over 30 years.
- The Other America: Michael Harrington's compelling study of the intractable plight of the poor in the U.S. is published. The book is later credited as an inspiration to President Lyndon Johnson's "war on poverty".
- Ken Kesey's One Flew Over the Cuckoo's Nest is published. The novel draws in part from Kesey's experiences as an MKUltra volunteer. An Oscar-winning adaptation hits theaters in 1975.
- Seven Days in May, a novel depicting a foiled military coup in the U.S., is published. A film follows in 1964 with an all-star cast.

=== 1963 ===
- Bob Fass begins the long-running late night Radio Unnameable program on WBAI-FM in New York City, a non-commercial listener-supported station that is later remembered as "the pulse of the movement" by Wavy Gravy.
- Principia Discordia is published, starting the Discordian movement.
- February 19: Influenced by Simone de Beauvoir's The Second Sex, Betty Friedan's The Feminine Mystique is published. The modern feminist movement is born.
- April: Chandler Laughlin organizes a Native American Church peyote ceremony, a forerunner to the Red Dog Experience.
- April–May: Birmingham Campaign: Civil rights activists organized by James Bevel and Martin Luther King are attacked by police in Birmingham, Alabama. Similar events occur at various locations across Southern states throughout the spring and summer.
- May 1: Undercover Bunny: Gloria Steinem's Playboy Club exposé appears in Show Magazine.
- May: "Louie Louie": The Kingsmen's version of the rock party standard is released. An FBI investigation revolves around the song's purportedly obscene lyrics but turns up no evidence. Extraneous to the garbled lyrics, the drummer yelling "fuck" is barely audible 54 seconds into the song.
- May: The first organized Vietnam War protests occur in England and Australia.
- June 10: A Strategy of Peace: President Kennedy delivers a powerful commencement speech at American University.
- June 11: Buddhist monk Thich Quang Duc self-immolates in Saigon. AP photographer Malcolm Browne's coverage of the horrific event reportedly motivates Kennedy to increase U.S. troop strength in the developing Vietnam War.
- June 12: NAACP Field Secretary Medgar Evers is assassinated in Jackson, Mississippi.
- June 17: The U.S. Supreme Court rules in the Abington School District v. Schempp case that public school-sponsored Bible reading is not permitted by the First Amendment of the Constitution.
- July 26–28: The Newport Folk Festival in Rhode Island features Bob Dylan and fellow protest singers Pete Seeger, Joan Baez, Phil Ochs, and Peter, Paul & Mary.
- August 28: I Have a Dream: Dr. Martin Luther King Jr. gives his landmark speech before 200,000 on the National Mall in Washington, D.C., during the March on Washington for Jobs and Freedom.
- September 24: The U.S. Senate ratifies The Partial Test Ban Treaty as signed by the U.S., the Soviet Union, and the United Kingdom, ending testing of nuclear weapons under water, in the atmosphere, and in space.
- September 26: The US Senate debates a report accusing folk music of promoting Communism. Two senators speak and conclude the musicians were entitled to speak their minds freely. The report was dismissed.
- October 27: 225,000 students in Chicago public schools boycott classes in protest against ongoing segregation.
- October 31: Harvard University is scandalized by a disclosure that students have engaged in on-campus "sex orgies."
- November 2: South Vietnamese President Ngo Dinh Diem is assassinated in Saigon.
- November 22: U.S. President John F. Kennedy is assassinated while traveling in an open-air motorcade during a visit to Dallas, Texas at age 46. Vice President Lyndon Baines Johnson is sworn in as 36th president shortly thereafter, on a return plane to Washington before it takes off.
- November 24: Suspected Kennedy assassin Lee Harvey Oswald is himself murdered by a Dallas nightclub proprietor, Jack Ruby, while he is being transported by inadequate police security in Dallas. The episodes adds further shock and anguish to an already-grief-stricken American public and creates doubt in the minds of those predisposed toward conspiratorial explanations of historical events. Such individuals begin circulating myriad theories concerning the original Kennedy Assassination and the veracity of later government investigations.

=== 1964 ===
- January: The Holy Modal Rounders' version of "Hesitation Blues" marks the first reference to the term psychedelic in popular music.
- January 8: President Johnson's State of the Union address features a declaration of a War on Poverty.
- January 13: The Times They Are A-Changin': Bob Dylan's third album is released and the title track is soon considered to be the most prophetic and relevant American protest song of the era. Dylan disagrees with the interpretation, claiming instead that the song "is a feeling."
- January 23: The Twenty-fourth Amendment to the United States Constitution ratified: the U.S. Congress and states are prohibited from conditioning the right to vote in federal elections on payment of a poll tax or other forms of tax. This is a direct attack on policies aimed to deter blacks from voting in Southern states.
- February 1: I Want to Hold Your Hand: The Beatles achieve their first hit No. 1 on Billboard with a 7-week run on top. Beatlemania has spread to America, and the monumental British Invasion of music across the free world is underway.
- February 3: Nearly half a million public school students participate in the New York City school boycott of classes in protest against segregation patterns.
- February 7–22: The Beatles make their first visit to the U.S. and are showcased three times on The Ed Sullivan Show. The February 9 telecast is seen by over 73 million viewers, and remains the largest audience for an American network broadcast television program to date in the US.
- February 25–26: Tens of thousands of school students in Boston and Chicago sit out of classes in protest against segregation in their respective cities.
- April 4: Beatles singles occupy the top five slots on the Billboard Hot 100. This is an unprecedented chart achievement that would not be equaled by another recording artist until 2021.
- April 13: Sidney Poitier becomes the first man of African descent to win the Oscar for Best Actor in Santa Monica, California.
- April 20: Approximately 85% of black students in Cleveland boycott classes to protest segregation.
- May: Robert Jasper Grootveld's surreal happenings begin in Spui square in Amsterdam with his unpredictable performances and famous cries of "Klaas is Coming!" and "Uche, Uche, Uche". Later described as the "announcer of the international spirit of revolution," Grootveld gained a following of Nozems (Dutch rockers) and inspired the start of the Provo (Provocation) movement in both Holland and California, introducing a playful element into social protest.
- May: Appearance of the Faire Free Press (later the Los Angeles Free Press), considered the earliest of many "underground" American newspapers of the time.
- May: San Francisco Sheraton Palace Hotel sit-ins result in arrests of University of California, Berkeley students protesting racially discriminatory hiring practices in the Bay area of California.
- May 7: President Johnson first refers to "the Great Society" in a speech at Ohio University.
- May 12: The first public draft-card burning takes place in New York City.
- June 14: The Merry Pranksters: Led by author Ken Kesey, an assemblage of adventure seekers departs California in the repurposed school bus Further en route to the 1964 World's Fair in Queens, New York City.
- June 22: I Know it When I See it: The U.S. Supreme Court overturns the obscenity conviction of an Ohio theater operator. Although local obscenity battles continue for years, the decision clears the way for the commercial exhibition of sexually explicit film material throughout American, overriding state and local prohibitions.
- July 2: The Civil Rights Act of 1964 is signed by President Johnson. Racial segregation in public places and race-based employment discrimination are now banned under Federal law. Some Southern states and localities, however, begin a systematic program of opposition.
- August 2: An Undeclared War: what were later revealed to be spurious incidents in the Gulf of Tonkin off the coast of Vietnam lead to the nearly unanimous passage of the a resolution by the U.S. Congress on August 7, giving the President broad authority, unprecedented in American history to engage in full "conventional" military escalation in Southeast Asia without obtaining a formal declaration of war.
- August 28: The Beatles reportedly use marijuana for the first time, allegedly supplied by Bob Dylan in New York City.
- September: Two National Farmers Organization members are killed when they and about 500 others attempt to stop a truck from taking cattle to market.
- October 1: The Free Speech Movement begins with a student sit-in at the University of California, Berkeley.
- October 14: Dr. Martin Luther King Jr. wins the Nobel Peace Prize.
- October 25: The Rolling Stones appear on The Ed Sullivan Show and create so much audience disruption that Sullivan bans the "lewd" group from his show. Sullivan, however, would rescind his ban due to the rock group's immense popularity during the remaining seven years of his program's duration.
- November 3: Sitting President Lyndon B. Johnson is elected in his own right, defeating Republican Arizona Senator Barry Goldwater in a landslide. Goldwater campaigns on a hard-line conservative platform that includes opposition to Civil Rights measures and is accused by the Johnson campaign of favoring nuclear weapons to settle world conflicts, a point made in a television advertisement that is considered the first modern-day political "attack ad."
- November 4: Comedian Lenny Bruce is convicted on obscenity charges in New York City after performing a routine about Eleanor Roosevelt's "tits" and other "offensive" subject matter. Bruce is soon sentenced to a workhouse.
- December 2: Put Your Bodies Upon the Gears: In a now-famous speech during a Berkeley sit-in, student Mario Savio tells supporters of the Free Speech Movement to protest the "machine" of the University of California's administration.

=== 1965 ===
- February 8: Aerial bombing of North Vietnam by the U.S. commences with Operation Rolling Thunder.
- February 9–15: Thousands demonstrate against American attacks on North Vietnam at the U.S. Embassies in Moscow, Budapest, Jakarta, and Sofia.
- February 21: Malcolm X, an Islamic cleric, author, and civil rights advocate is assassinated in New York City.
- March: Several protestors are arrested for publicly uttering profanity in the "Filthy Speech Movement" at UC Berkeley.
- March 7–25: The SCLC stages the watershed Selma to Montgomery marches, initially organized by James Bevel.
- March 8: 1,400 Marines of the U.S. 9th Marine Expeditionary Brigade begin to land on beaches near Da Nang. The arrival of the Marines heralds the direct involvement of American combat units in Vietnam.
- March 16: Alice Herz, an 82-year-old German émigré, burns herself to death in Detroit while protesting escalation of military activities in Vietnam. Herz dies 10 days later.
- March 24–25: The first major "Teach-in" is held by the SDS in Ann Arbor, Michigan. Some 3000 persons attend.
- March 25: For Your Love: Already a guitar legend, blues purist Eric Clapton quits The Yardbirds after the release of the proto-psychedelic hit. Clapton recommends Jimmy Page to fill his spot. Page declines the offer, but suggests Jeff Beck, who accepts. In 1966, Page joins the group. He and several other British musicians would start the pioneering "heavy metal" band Led Zeppelin in 1968.
- Spring: Don't trust anyone over 30: Berkeley graduate student and Free Speech activist Jack Weinberg's quip is quoted in paraphrase, inadvertently generating a key catchphrase frequently used by people in that age group.
- Spring: A circle of late-beat-era folk musicians including John Phillips, Michelle Phillips, Cass Elliot, and Denny Doherty rusticate in a communal beach tent on St. Thomas to party and create music. The working vacation, financed on Phillips' American Express card, results in the formation of The Mamas and the Papas, and a lucrative recording contract. The events are recounted in song on the group's hit 1967 single "Creeque Alley".
- April: Beatles John Lennon and George Harrison experience LSD for the first time at a British dinner party hosted by Harrison's dentist.
- April: American combat troops in Vietnam total 25,000.
- April 16: Needle of Death: The debut album of Scottish folk musician Bert Jansch features a song of warning concerning the deadly dangers of heroin.
- April 17: The first major anti-Vietnam War rally in the U.S. is organized by the SDS in Washington, D.C. 20,000 attend the March Against the Vietnam War. Folk singers Joan Baez, Judy Collins, and Phil Ochs perform.
- May: Owsley Stanley returns to the Bay Area of northern California with the first large batch of LSD to sell as a recreational drug.
- May 5: Draft card burnings take place in Berkeley. Several hundred University of California students confront the Berkeley Draft Board (BDB) and deliver a black coffin to the staff.
- May: Jerry Rubin, Stephen Smale, Paul Montauk, Abbie Hoffman and other war opponents form the Vietnam Day Committee.
- May 17: Hunter S. Thompson's article "The Motorcycle Gangs: A portrait of an outsider underground" appears in The Nation. A book based on the piece soon follows.
- May 20–22: The Vietnam Day Committee organizes the largest Vietnam teach-in to date. Some 30,000 reportedly attend the 36-hour event in Berkeley, including Benjamin Spock, Norman Thomas, Norman Mailer, Mario Savio, Paul Krassner, Dick Gregory and Phil Ochs. Hundreds march, again, to the local draft board office, where President Johnson is hanged in effigy, and many burn draft cards.
- May: Drop City: One of the earliest American hippie communes is founded in Colorado. The Droppers build geodesic domes constructed from trashed automobile hoods and roofs, notably involving collaborations with Steve Baer and Buckminster Fuller-inspired Zomes.
- June: Kim Fowley releases the song "The Trip" which contains one of the first explicit references to an LSD trip in a commercially released rock song.
- June–August: Red Dog Experience comes into full flower at Virginia City, Nevada's Red Dog Saloon – a full-fledged "hippie" identity takes shape.
- June 7: Griswold v. Connecticut: The U.S. Supreme Court rules that the Constitution's guarantee to a right to privacy invalidates a Connecticut statute banning use of contraceptives by married couples, a law enacted by a government composed largely of adherents to the Roman Catholic faith, which has always held birth control to be a sin worthy of eternal punishment. "Comstock-era" laws are likewise now moot in other states. In 1972, the Court rules that the protections must be applied to unmarried couples as well.
- June 11: International Poetry Incarnation: Notables including Allen Ginsberg, Lawrence Ferlinghetti, Michael Horovitz, and William S. Burroughs participate in a breakthrough event for the UK underground, Royal Albert Hall, London.
- June 11: The Beatles are appointed as Members of the Most Excellent Order of the British Empire (MBE) by Queen Elizabeth for their contributions to British arts and commerce. The myth that the group smoked marijuana in a Palace bathroom after the investiture ceremony in October is later debunked by George Harrison.
- July 25: Bob Dylan "goes electric" and is booed by some attendees at the Newport Folk Festival.
- July 30: Medicare is signed into law in the U.S., giving senior citizens the ability to afford health care, without worrying about being dependent upon children or losing their assets.
- August: Phil Ochs releases the satirical "Draft Dodger Rag" on the album I Ain't Marching Anymore. He later performs the song on the CBS News special Avoiding the Draft. Pete Seeger's version appears in 1966.
- August 6: The Voting Rights Act is signed into law in the U.S.; "Literacy tests", poll taxes and other local schemes to prevent voting by blacks are newly or further banned under Federal law.
- August 11: Watts: Six days of massive race riots erupt in the Watts neighborhood of Los Angeles. 34 die, 1000 are injured, hundreds of buildings are looted or destroyed, and thousands of people are arrested. Meanwhile, smaller riots occur in Chicago.
- August 24: She Said She Said: Shortly after setting a concert attendance record at Shea Stadium, Queens, New York, the Beatles briefly rest in Benedict Canyon in Los Angeles, near the end of their grueling American tour. With ongoing Beatlemania preventing the band from leaving their rented home, they invite local company, including members of the Byrds, Peter Fonda, Joan Baez, and Peggy Lipton. An LSD trip inspires John Lennon to write a song, which appears on Revolver in 1966. As the era progresses, nearby Laurel Canyon becomes home to many prominent counterculture musicians.
- August 30: Bob Dylan's Highway 61 Revisited is released, featuring the six-minute single "Like a Rolling Stone".
- August 31: Destruction of draft cards becomes formally prohibited by U.S. law.
- September 5: The word hippie is used in print by San Francisco writer Michael Fallon, helping popularise use of the term in the media. However, the term had appeared earlier, e.g. in a remark about marijuana cookies by syndicated journalist Dorothy Kilgallen in her June 11, 1963, column.
- September 8: Actress Dorothy Dandridge, the first African-American nominated for a Best Actress Oscar, dies of an apparent accidental prescription drug overdose in Los Angeles, although a later analysis suggests a rare embolism may have been the cause.
- September 15: I-Spy: Comedian Bill Cosby becomes the first African-American to star in a dramatic American television series. (Amanda Randolph had starred in the comedy The Laytons on the short-lived DuMont Network in the late 1940s.)
- September 25: The Beatles Saturday morning cartoon series debuts on U.S. television, aimed at an audience of children.
- September 25: Eve of Destruction: Barry McGuire's version of P.F. Sloan's work becomes the first protest song to hit No. 1 in the charts. However, it draws heavy criticism and is banned by numerous radio stations.
- October: Australian garage rock band the Missing Links release the single "H'tuom Tuhs Part 1 / H'tuom Tuhs Part 2", which contains one of the earliest uses of reverse tape effects on a rock recording.
- October: The Yardbirds, featuring Jeff Beck, release the single "Shapes of Things" with the B-side "Still I'm Sad." By this, psychedelic rock first makes the charts.
- October 1: The East Village Other begins publication in East Village, Manhattan, New York City.
- October 15–16: Vietnam War protests in cities across the U.S. draw 100,000.
- October 16: A Tribute to Dr. Strange: Dan Hicks helps organize a Family Dog event where 1,000 original San Francisco "hippies" party en masse at Longshoreman's Hall. Still yet to be prohibited by Federal or state law, Owsley's "White Lightning" acid (LSD) is made available to all.
- November: The Autobiography of Malcolm X is published posthumously by Grove Press. Derived from interviews of the slain activist by writer Alex Haley, it is considered to be one of the most influential works of non-fiction of the 20th century. Doubleday's cancellation of its original contract for the bestseller is later viewed by critics as the biggest mistake in publishing history.
- November 2: Quaker leader Norman Morrison self-immolates at the Pentagon to protest the war. Secretary of Defense McNamara witnesses the scene from his office in the building.
- November 5: My Generation: The Who speak to the new youth. "This is my generation!" and "I hope I die before I get old" become mantras of the rising counterculture.
- November 9: Catholic peace activist Roger Allen LaPorte self-immolates at the United Nations building in New York City.
- November 19: Fifth Estate: The first issue of the long-running anti-authoritarian newspaper is published in Detroit.
- November 20: 8,000 anti-war protesters march from Berkeley to Oakland in California.
- November 27: Ken Kesey's Merry Pranksters hold the first "Acid Test" at Soquel, California.
- November 27: Up to 35,000 anti-war protesters march in front of the White House.
- November 30: Unsafe at Any Speed: Activist attorney Ralph Nader's wake-up call concerning automotive safety is published and fuels the modern Consumer Movement. Nader's ongoing work contributes to the passage of the U.S. National Traffic and Motor Vehicle Safety Act of 1966. In 1972 alone, annual American highway deaths peak at 54,589, approaching the total number of war dead during the entire duration of U.S. combat involvement in Vietnam.
- December: California Dreamin': A westward clarion call is released by The Mamas and the Papas.
- December: The Pretty Things release Get the Picture?. The album includes a song entitled £.S.D.
- December 3: The Beatles' Rubber Soul is released in the United Kingdom with a visually distorted image of the group on the cover. The album contains "Norwegian Wood", which sparks the "great sitar explosion" in pop music.
- December 23: Timothy Leary is arrested for drug possession at the U.S.-Mexico border.

=== 1966 ===
- January 8: 2,400 attend when the "Acid Tests" arrive at the Fillmore West nightclub in San Francisco.
- January 21–23: Chet Helms' Family Dog "Trips Festival" is attended by 10,000 in San Francisco; half are reputedly under the influence of LSD.
- February 10: Valley of the Dolls: Jacqueline Susann's best-selling novel of sex and the perils of prescription drug abuse by women is published.
- March 8: London Free School is launched by John "Hoppy" Hopkins and Rhaune Laslett, leading to the start of the International Times/IT, the UFO Club and the Notting Hill Carnival as a street party featuring some of the earliest performances of Pink Floyd.
- March 11: Timothy Leary is sentenced to 30 years for his 1965 Mexican border marijuana drug offense.
- March 14: Eight Miles High: The Byrds' psychedelic 12-string-electric guitar anthem is released and briefly banned on radio due to perceived drug-culture subject matter.
- March 16: 12 Australians burn their draft cards at a Sydney rally against Australia's participation in the Vietnam War.
- March 25–27: Anti-Vietnam War demonstrations take place in many cities across America and around the world.
- April: What a Drag it is Getting Old: "Mother's Little Helper", the Rolling Stones' single about prescription pill-popping housewives, is released in Great Britain. "Doctor Robert", the Beatles' similar nod to a liberally prescribing physician, appears in June.
- April 5: The U.S. Food and Drug Administration warns about the danger of LSD in a letter sent to some 2,000 universities.
- April 7: Sandoz, the sole legitimate manufacturer of pharmaceutical-grade LSD, stops supplying the drug to researchers.
- April 17: Millbrook: Under the auspices of then-prosecutor G. Gordon Liddy, Timothy Leary is arrested for possession of marijuana at his upstate New York retreat, a haven of East Coast hippie activity. Liddy cannot, however, prosecute Leary for possessing LSD, which is still legal.
- May: Folk rock band the Lovin' Spoonful were arrested in San Francisco, California, for possessing one ounce (28 g) of marijuana. The arrest marked the first time 1960s pop musicians were busted for possessing illegal drugs.
- May 7: Psychedelic bellwether "Paint It Black" is released in the U.S. by the Rolling Stones.
- May 12: Students take over the administration building at the University of Chicago in protest against the draft.
- May 15: 10,000 anti-war protesters picket the White House.
- May 16: The Beach Boys release the highly influential album Pet Sounds.
- May 18: 10,000 students rally against the draft at the University of Wisconsin, Madison.
- May 29: The phrase "Black Power" re-emerges among contenders for Civil Rights.
- May 30: Featuring reversed sounds for the first time on a pop music recording, the Beatles' psychedelic "Rain" is released as the B-side of "Paperback Writer".
- May/June: Resurgence magazine is first published in the United Kingdom. Notable contributors will include E. F. Schumacher, Ivan Illich, R. D. Laing and The Dalai Lama.
- June 4: The New York Times publishes a petition to end the Vietnam War, containing 6,400 signatures, including many prominent scholars and clergy.
- June 10: After appearing in a television documentary in January, Donovan is arrested in London for possession of cannabis, and is perhaps the first notable counterculture musician to be targeted in the growing war on drugs. The incident is later derided as "ridiculous" and "comical".
- June 13: Miranda v. Arizona: The U.S. Supreme Court rules that the Fifth Amendment to the Constitution provides protection against self-incrimination, thus requiring Federal, state, and local law enforcement officials to advise a suspect interrogated while in custody of the right to remain silent and the right to obtain an attorney.
- June 25: Lenny Bruce performs for the last time. The show at the Fillmore West in San Francisco also showcases Frank Zappa.
- June 27: Freak Out!, a pioneer concept album, is released by Frank Zappa's Mothers of Invention.
- June 30: The National Organization of Women (NOW) is founded in Washington, D.C.
- June 30: In their tour press conference in Tokyo, the Beatles speak out publicly against the Vietnam War for the first time, defying their manager Brian Epstein's insistence that they remain apolitical. During the band's subsequent American tour, in August, George Harrison says: "War is wrong, and it's obvious it's wrong. And that's all that needs to be said about it."
- July: Beatle backlash: Some American disc jockeys in the Southern and Midwestern U.S., responding to pressure by conservative religious groups hostile to the counterculture, incite thousands to burn Beatles records after John Lennon uttered a comment claiming that his band was "more popular than Jesus."
- July: Sunshine Superman: Donovan's hit contains the first open reference to "tripping" in a chart-topping song.
- July: After skipping an invitation to a breakfast reception from Philippines' dictators Ferdinand & Imelda Marcos, the Beatles find themselves stranded without police protection and in fear for their lives. John Lennon states that "if we go back, it will be with an H-Bomb."
- July 16: Wes Wilson's rock concert poster for The Association, playing at the Fillmore, is the first significant psychedelic rock concert poster, after which many follow for other concerts, and the style becomes significant.
- July 29: Bob Dylan crashes his motorcycle near Woodstock, New York, and begins a period of much-needed retreat from public life.
- July–September: Riots break out throughout the summer in several American cities, with deaths in Chicago and Cleveland (July), Waukegan, Illinois, and Benton Harbor, Michigan (August), and damage in many other cities.
- August 3: Lenny Bruce, called "the most radically relevant of all contemporary social satirists" is found dead at age 40 from a morphine overdose in Los Angeles.
- August 5: The Beatles release their album Revolver, which includes "Tomorrow Never Knows", a song that came to be widely regarded as "the most effective evocation of a LSD experience ever recorded". The track is founded on a single-chord tambura drone and features tape loops, backward sounds and other musique concrète elements, and lyrics taken from Timothy Leary's The Psychedelic Experience: A Manual Based on the Tibetan Book of the Dead.
- August 29: Candlestick Park: The Beatles perform their final concert in San Francisco, before retiring from live performances.
- September 9: LSD is banned in Great Britain.
- September 12: An American television program debuts in response to the Beatles' popularlity, The Monkees, on NBC. In 1967, the band outsells the Beatles and the Rolling Stones combined, far exceeding creator Don Kirshner's expectations.
- September 19: Timothy Leary begins his "Turn on, tune in, drop out" crusade in New York City, founding a de facto religion centered around LSD titled "League for Spiritual Discovery".
- September 20: Anti-establishment publisher Allen Cohen's underground newspaper The San Francisco Oracle begins publication in the Haight-Ashbury district.
- October 6: The use and sale of LSD is formally prohibited in the U.S.
- October 6: Love Pageant Rally: A gathering of hippies, including many notable Haight-Ashbury luminaries is held in San Francisco, marking the LSD ban. The Grateful Dead and Janis Joplin perform for free. Despite the Federal ban, the illicit manufacture and use of LSD continues.
- October 10: Good Vibrations: The Beach Boys release Brian Wilson and Mike Love's psychedelic tour de force.
- October 15: The Black Panther Party is established by Huey Newton and Bobby Seale in Oakland, California.
- November 9: Beatle John Lennon first meets avant-garde Japanese artist and future wife Yoko Ono at London's Indica Gallery.
- November 12: For What It's Worth: The Sunset Strip teen curfew riots in West Hollywood, California inspire Stephen Stills to pen a protest song for his rock group Buffalo Springfield.
- December 8: MGM releases the British film Blow-Up without approval of the movie ratings group MPAA, signalling the beginning of the end of enforcement of the Hays Code. In late 1968, the MPAA institutes the first voluntary system of movie ratings, intended as a guide for viewers as to a film's content and age-appropriateness.
- December 17: Diggers "Death of Money" happening on Haight Street. Two Hells Angels who join the action are arrested, and a large crowd marches to the police station in spontaneous protest.
- December 23 and 30: UFO Club, London's first psychedelic nightclub, opens. Hoppy and Joe Boyd hire an Irish venue, The Blarney Club, on Tottenham Court Road, bringing the sound/light show of Pink Floyd and Soft Machine to the West End.
- December 30: Hoppy's London flat is raided. Hoppy and four others are arrested for possession of marijuana.

=== 1967 ===
- January 12: LSD is the subject of the debut "Blue Boy" episode of the topical, but square and sermon-laden television police drama Dragnet '67. The program is a revival of a popular 1950s show and incessantly promotes the need for "law and order" in American life. Jack Webb, who portrays a middle-aged detective and produces the program, parlays the show's success among conservative and patriotic audiences into several other successful programs in the 1970s.
- January 14: Human Be-In: "The joyful, face-to-face beginning of the new epoch" is held in Golden Gate Park, San Francisco. 20,000 attend.
- January 28: The Million Volt Light and Sound Rave: The Beatles contribute a to-date unreleased experimental "sound collage" for early raves at the Round House Theatre, London.
- January 29: The Mantra-Rock Dance is held at the Avalon Ballroom in San Francisco. The Hare Krishna religion is promoted, and the Grateful Dead, Big Brother and the Holding Company and Moby Grape perform. Ginsberg, Leary and Owsley attend.
- February: Surrealistic Pillow by Jefferson Airplane is released. Grace Slick becomes the first major female rock music performer. Psilocybin mushrooms are visible on the album cover. Tracks include "White Rabbit", and "D.C.B.A.-25", referring to the song's chords and LSD-25.
- February: Noam Chomsky's anti-Vietnam War essay The Responsibility of Intellectuals is published in The New York Review of Books.
- February 5: The Smothers Brothers Comedy Hour debuts on CBS television and soon pushes the boundaries of acceptable broadcast content to the limit.
- February 10: A Day in the Life: The Beatles stage a gathering of rock and other celebrities including Donovan, Keith Richards, Mick Jagger, Mike Nesmith and Pattie Boyd to observe the recording of the final orchestral overdubs for Sgt. Pepper's Lonely Hearts Club Band at Abbey Road Studios in London.
- February 11: New York disc jockey Bob Fass uses the airwaves to inspire an impromptu gathering of thousands at Kennedy Airport, in what is later called a "prehistoric flash mob".
- February 13: The Beatles issue John Lennon's psychedelic masterwork "Strawberry Fields Forever" as part of a double A-side with "Penny Lane". Either the words "Cranberry sauce" or "I buried Paul" is heard after the song fades out, something disputed fiercely by listeners.
- February 14: London's first Macrobiotic Restaurant run by Craig Sams opens at Centre House and also supplies food to the UFO Club.
- February 17: The cover of Life Magazine features Ed Sanders of The Fugs below "HAPPENINGS – The worldwide underground of the arts creates – THE OTHER CULTURE."
- February 22: MacBird! opens at the Village Gate in New York City and runs for 386 performances. The controversial play compares Lyndon Johnson to Shakespeare's Macbeth, who caused the death of his predecessor.
- March 26: 10,000 attend the New York City "Be-In" in Central Park.
- April 4: "Beyond Vietnam: A Time to Break Silence": Martin Luther King Jr. delivers a monumental anti-war speech.
- April 8–10: Race riots break out in Nashville, Tennessee. Activist Stokely Carmichael and Allen Ginsberg are present.
- April 15: National Mobilization Committee to End the War in Vietnam: An estimated 400,000 protest the escalating Vietnam War in New York City, marching from Central Park to UN Headquarters. Martin Luther King Jr., James Bevel, Benjamin Spock, and Stokely Carmichael speak. 75,000 assemble in San Francisco where Coretta Scott King speaks.
- April 28: Boxing champion Muhammad Ali refuses induction into the U.S. Army in Houston, Texas, on the grounds that he is a conscientious objector to the war in Vietnam.
- April 29: The 14 Hour Technicolor Dream: Pink Floyd featuring Syd Barrett headlines for 7,000 attending a groundbreaking televised psychedelic rave to promote love and peace at Alexandra Palace, London.
- May: The radical left-wing underground newspaper Seed begins publication in Chicago.
- May 2: Armed Black Panthers led by Bobby Seale enter the chambers of the California State Assembly in Sacramento, protesting a bill to outlaw open carry of loaded firearms. Seale and five others are arrested.
- May 5: Mr. Natural: Robert Crumb's soon-to-be ubiquitous underground comix counterculture icon makes his first appearance in the premiere issue of Yarrowstalks.
- May 10: Rolling Stone Brian Jones is arrested for drug possession. He is arrested again in 1968. Jones' conviction record renders him largely unable to tour outside of Great Britain.
- May 15–17: Student protesters confront police at the historically African-American Texas Southern University in Houston, resulting in the death of a police officer and over 400 arrests.
- May 20–21: The Spring Mobilization Conference is held in Washington, D.C. Seven hundred anti-war activists gather to discuss the April 15 protests, and to plan future demonstrations.
- June: Vietnam Veterans Against the War is formed in New York City.
- June–July: Race riots create upheaval in cities across the U.S.
- June–September: The "Summer of Love" in Haight-Ashbury, San Francisco and recognition of the hippie movement.
- June 1: The Beatles' Sgt. Pepper's Lonely Hearts Club Band is released and widely recognized as the high-water mark of the brief psychedelic rock era. Some critics would, years later, rate it as the greatest rock album of all time.
- June 10–11: Fantasy Fair and Magic Mountain Music Festival: The Summer of Love kicks off at Mount Tamalpais, Marin County, California. Over 30,000 see the Byrds, Doors, Jefferson Airplane, Country Joe & the Fish, and dozens of other acts perform in the first rock festival gathering of its kind.
- June 12: The U.S. Supreme Court, in Loving v. Virginia, rules that state laws prohibiting interracial marriage are unconstitutional.
- June 16: Paul McCartney is the first Beatle to publicly discuss LSD use. Quotes from a British magazine are re-published in a Life Magazine article entitled "The New Far-Out Beatles." McCartney is interviewed on film concerning the controversy on the 19th.
- June 16–18: The Monterey Pop Festival in Monterey, California, organized principally by John Phillips of The Mamas and the Papas, draws thousands and is the first large, extended festival of the rock era. Jimi Hendrix returns from the U.K. and makes his U.S. "debut." David Crosby uses his time at the microphone to brashly condemn the Warren Report.
- June 25: The Beatles' contribute a performance of their summer U.K. hit All You Need Is Love to the first live global satellite TV broadcast, reaching an estimated 200–400 million people worldwide via the BBC.
- July 7: The cover of Time features "The Hippies: The Philosophy of a Subculture."
- July 15–30: Dialectics of Liberation Congress: A gathering of leftist intellectuals in London finds itself on the receiving end of a prank, when Digger Emmett Grogan delivers a speech to rousing applause. The audience then becomes irate when Grogan reveals that his words are culled entirely from a 1937 speech by Adolf Hitler. The episode later inspires a scene in the fictional 1971 cult film Billy Jack.
- July 16: Hyde Park Rally: 5,000 gather in London to protest "immoral in principle and unworkable in practice" British marijuana laws. A petition signed by many notables is published.
- July 23–27: Detroit Riots: An arrest made on an early Sunday morning at a party where illegal liquor is sold provokes a youngster on a street outside to call for massive resistance to law enforcement, rapidly releasing years of aggravating tension between Detroit's black community and the city's mostly white police force and local leaders. Within hours, the incident erupts into the worst outbreak of urban lawlessness of the century to date: 43 deaths, 467 injuries, over 7,200 arrests, and the burning of over 2,000 buildings to the ground.
- August 27: Death of Brian Epstein: the man credited with "discovering" the Beatles, their manager and friend, dies of a prescription drug overdose in London at age 32.
- September 17: The Doors perform their hit "Light My Fire" on The Ed Sullivan Show, but fail to remove the perceived drug term "higher" from the lyric as instructed by producers.
- September 30: Hip Radio 1 commences broadcast over the legitimate airwaves of the BBC following the U.K. ban on offshore "pirate" radio transmissions.
- September: 18-year-old folk singer-songwriter Arlo Guthrie releases the 18-minute song Alice's Restaurant Massacree. It becomes a staple of FM rock radio every Thanksgiving afterward.
- October 2: 710 Ashbury Street: Members of the Grateful Dead and others are busted for drug possession when their communal home is targeted and raided in San Francisco.
- October 6: The "Death of Hippie" march is held in Haight-Ashbury by the Diggers as a mock funeral meant to signal the end of the Summer of Love and stop further commercialization of the hippie movement.
- October 9: Death of Che Guevara: The Argentine revolutionary is executed in Bolivia.
- October 17: Stop the Draft Week: Demonstrators attack the U.S. Army Induction Center in Oakland, California. Singer Joan Baez is among those arrested. Some are charged with sedition.
- October 17: Hair: a timely stage play featuring controversial full-frontal nudity premieres to mature audiences off-Broadway in New York City. The play becomes a Broadway smash in 1968.
- October 19: Thousands of students clash with police at Brooklyn College in New York after two military recruiters appear on campus. Students strike the following day.
- October 20–21: "Mobe's" March on the Pentagon: 100,000 protest the war in Washington, D.C. Jerry Rubin, Abbie Hoffman and others lead attempts at "exorcism" and levitation of the Pentagon.
- October 27: Baltimore Four: Catholic priest Philip Berrigan and three others are jailed after pouring blood on conscription files in the SSS office, protesting the bloodshed in Vietnam. Berrigan is later convicted.
- October 28: Black Panther leader Huey Newton is stopped by Oakland police. A shootout resulting in the death of an officer leads to Newton's conviction, which is later overturned.
- November 9: Rolling Stone Magazine: John Lennon is featured on the cover of the first issue in a photo from the film How I Won The War. Rolling Stone becomes a focal point for news and reviews aimed at young people during the era, and continues to the present day.
- November 10: Disraeli Gears: Cream's quintessential psychedelic rock album is released.
- November 10: The Moody Blues' masterpiece Days of Future Passed, featuring psychedelic themes and the London Festival Orchestra, is released.
- November 20: Police, using tear gas, charge a large student demonstration against corporate recruiters for napalm manufacturer Dow Chemical at San Jose State College in California.
- November 24: I Am the Walrus: The Beatles release John Lennon's psychedelic coda. The album Magical Mystery Tour is released on November 27.
- December 4–8: Anti-war groups across the U.S. attempt to shut down draft board centers. Dr. Benjamin Spock and poet Allen Ginsberg are among the 585 arrested in association with the initiative.
- December 10: Monterey Pop Fest stand-out and soon-to-be soul legend Otis Redding dies in a plane crash at age 26.
- December 22: Owsley Stanley is found in possession of 350,000 doses of LSD and 1,500 doses of STP, arrested, and sentenced to three years in prison.
- December 31: Yippies: "Yippie" is coined by radicals Jerry Rubin, Abbie Hoffman, Anita Hoffman, Dick Gregory, Nancy Kurshan and Paul Krassner. In January, the Youth International Party is formed. Inspired by the Diggers, the humorous Yippies also take the counterculture protest movement into the realm of performance theater.
- Originally a surgical anesthetic, PCP begins to appear as a recreational drug.

=== 1968 ===
- Tom Wolfe's The Electric Kool-Aid Acid Test is published.
- January: Owsley-inspired pioneer heavy metal rock band Blue Cheer release Vincebus Eruptum, while early metal ground-breakers Iron Butterfly release their debut, Heavy.
- January 22: Laugh-In: The sketch comedy "phenomenon that both reflected and mocked the era's counterculture" and brought it into "mainstream living rooms" debuts on American television, on the NBC network.
- January 31: The Tet Offensive is launched by the North Vietnamese Army and the Viet Cong (sympathizers of the North in South Vietnam). Western forces are victorious on the battlefield, but press coverage, especially that by television, begins to turn public opinion against American military operations there.
- February 1: Following the free-form programming experimentations at KFRC-FM in San Francisco, WABX-FM in Detroit and some other stations nationwide begin to officially change their formats. FM playlists and other content are increasingly chosen by local disc jockeys, instead of corporate executives or record companies. The Progressive Rock format takes hold.
- February 4: Beat figure and Merry Prankster Neal Cassady dies in Mexico of unknown causes at age 41.
- February 8: Orangeburg Massacre: Police fire on and kill three people protesting segregation at a South Carolina bowling alley.
- February 15: The Beatles in India: All four Beatles, along with fellow devotees such as Mike Love, Donovan and Mia Farrow, journey to Rishikesh in India to study Transcendental Meditation under Maharishi Mahesh Yogi. John Lennon and George Harrison are the last of the celebrities to leave; they depart amid unsubstantiated rumors of the Maharishi's sexual impropriety toward some of the female students and the band members' suspicions that he was using their fame for self-promotion.
- February 29: Kerner Report: The Report of the National Advisory Commission on Civil Disorders is released after seven months of investigation into American urban rioting, and states that "our nation is moving towards two societies, one black, one white – separate and unequal."
- March 16: My Lai Massacre in Vietnam. An apparently wanton rape and murder of civilians by American soldiers creates an enormous new anti-war outcry when the incident becomes public knowledge in 1969.
- March 17: London police stop 10,000 anti-war marchers from violently storming the U.S. Embassy. Two hundred persons are arrested. The protest serves as partial inspiration for the Rolling Stones' most notable political foray, "Street Fighting Man".
- March 18: RFK In: U.S. Senator Robert F. Kennedy (D-New York), a long-time supporter of American policy in Vietnam, speaks out against the war for the first time, and announces his candidacy for president.
- March 22: 3,000 Yippies take over Grand Central Station in New York City, staging a "Yip-In" that ultimately results in what was then termed an "extraordinary display of unprovoked police brutality" and 61 arrests.
- March 31: LBJ Out: Embattled President Lyndon Johnson addresses the public about Vietnam on prime-time television and shocks the nation with his closing remark that, in order to focus on the war effort, he would forego pursuing a second elected term as president. The national political culture is thrown into chaos as a result.
- Spring: Reggae: "Nanny Goat" by Larry Marshall, and Do the Reggay by Toots and the Maytals mark the arrival of a new musical genre to American shores. Johnny Nash ("Hold Me Tight"), and Paul McCartney ("Ob-La-Di, Ob-La-Da") are inspired by the Jamaican sound.
- March–May: Columbia University protests occur in New York City. "Up Against the Wall Motherfuckers" becomes a protest slogan at this time, as well as the name of a radical activist group.
- April: The U.S. Department of Defense begins calling-up reservists for duty in Vietnam. The Supreme Court turns down a challenge to that mobilization in October.
- April 4: Martin Luther King Jr. assassinated: The Rev. Dr. Martin Luther King Jr. is assassinated on the balcony of a Memphis, Tennessee motel while in the city to assist a sanitation workers' strike. James Earl Ray, a St. Louis, Missouri-area native who had no permanent residence, is soon arrested for the murder. The King family later expresses complete doubt as to Ray's guilt. Violence erupts in cities across the nation, with thousands of Federal troops dispatched. Memphis, Chicago, Baltimore, Kansas City, and Washington, D.C., in particular experience strong rioting.
- April 5: A Yippie plot to disrupt the upcoming Democratic National Convention in Chicago in August is reported by Time.
- April 6: Oakland Shootout: Black Panther Bobby Hutton is killed, and another, Eldridge Cleaver, is wounded in a gun battle with police. Cleaver later claims that Hutton was murdered while in police custody.
- April 8: The U.S. Bureau of Narcotics (Treasury Department) and Bureau of Drug Abuse Control (of the Food and Drug Administration) merge into the Bureau of Narcotics and Dangerous Drugs, substantially ramping up efforts to rid the country of illegal substances.
- April 14: The Easter Sunday "Love-In" is held in Malibu Canyon in California.
- April 27: Anti-war protesters march in several American cities, including 87,000 in New York City's Central Park.
- May: The Fabulous Furry Freak Brothers first appear in The Rag, an Austin, Texas underground paper.
- May 2: MAI 68: Massive student protests erupt in France which escalate and spread, leading to a general strike and widespread civil unrest during May and June, bringing the country to a virtual standstill.
- May 10: The Paris Peace Talks commence in France, with the war in Southeast Asia the subject of the negotiations.
- May 12: Martin Luther King's Poor People's Campaign establishes "Resurrection City", a shanty town on the National Mall in Washington, D.C., which around 5,000 protesters occupy.
- May 17: Catonsville Nine: Catholic priests opposed to the war, including Daniel Berrigan, destroy records at a Maryland draft office.
- May 24–27: Louisville Riots: After a claim of police brutality, police and thousands of National Guard in Kentucky confront rioting protesters and looters. Two black teenagers die before order is restored.
- June 3: Artist Andy Warhol is shot and wounded by a self-described "radical feminist" writer.
- June 5: Robert F. Kennedy assassinated: Senator Robert Francis Kennedy, winner of the California Democratic Presidential Primary earlier that day, and the new presumptive front-runner in that hotly contested race, is mortally wounded at a hotel in Los Angeles during a victory party. He dies June 6.
- June 19: A "Solidarity Day" protest at Resurrection City draws 55,000 participants.
- June 24: Remnants of "Resurrection City," with only some 300 protesters still remaining, are razed by riot police.
- July 17: The Beatles' post-psychedelic, pop-art animated film Yellow Submarine is released in the U.K. (November 13 in the U.S.).
- July 28–30: The University of California, Berkeley campus is shut down entirely by protests.
- August 21: Prague Spring: Communist tanks roll into Czechoslovakia and crush the popular anti-Soviet uprising which began in January.
- August 25–29: Democratic National Convention in Chicago. The proceedings are overshadowed by massive protests staged by thousands of demonstrators of every political or social stripe. Mayor Daley's desire to enforce rigid order in the city prompts local police to deal with the mostly peaceful protestors violently, a scene televised on national airwaves alongside the convention's proceedings. On the third night, police indiscriminately attack protesters and bystanders, including journalists Mike Wallace and Dan Rather and Playboy publisher Hugh Hefner. The next night police attack anti-war protesters in front of the Conrad Hilton Hotel as demonstrators chant "The whole world is watching". The spectacle amounts to a turning point for both supporters and critics of the larger movement.
- August 26: Revolution?: Lennon's B-side to McCartney's smash "Hey Jude" is released. Its eschewing of violent protest is seen as a betrayal by some on the left. A version recorded earlier is released in November and suggests indecision as to Lennon's stance on violence.
- August 31: First Isle of Wight Festival featuring Jefferson Airplane, Arthur Brown, The Move, T-Rex and The Pretty Things takes place in Great Britain.
- September 7: Miss America Protest: Feminists demonstrate against what they call "The Degrading Mindless-Boob-Girlie Symbol," filling a "freedom trash can" with housekeeping items such as mops, pots and pans, copies of Cosmopolitan and Playboy magazines, false eyelashes, high-heeled shoes, curlers, hairspray, makeup, girdles, corsets, and bras. The widely reported "burning of bras," despite not being substantiated by eyewitness evidence, becomes a potent urban legend for the burgeoning "women's lib" movement.
- September 24: The Mod Squad: "One Black, One White, One Blonde" is the tagline for a hip, troubled-kids-turned-cops television police drama, which debuts on this date on ABC. It runs until 1973.
- September 28: Ten thousand people in Chicago protest on the one-month anniversary of the Convention violence.
- Fall: Stewart Brand begins publication of The Whole Earth Catalog.
- October 2: Tlatelolco massacre: Students and police violently clash in Mexico City.
- October 16: Mexico '68: Medal-winning American sprinters Tommie Smith and John Carlos raise their gloved hands on the Olympic award podium to protest global human rights shortcomings. Their demonstration is met with both international praise and death threats alike, a sign of the polarization that is occurring among Americans outside youth and left-wing circles.
- October 18: John Lennon and Yoko Ono are arrested for drug possession in London. Lennon is only fined for his first offence, and more serious obstruction charges against the pair are dropped, but the arrest will later serve as a pretext for a politically motivated attempted deportation of Lennon from the U.S. in the 1970s.
- October 25: Emile de Antonio's highly controversial and Oscar nominated anti-war documentary In the Year of the Pig (per the Chinese "Year of the Pig") is released. Although it is otherwise reported, as de Antonio aspires to the leftist badge of honor, he never actually appears on President Nixon's Enemies List.
- October 27: Twenty-five thousand march in London against the Vietnam War, and particularly British participation in it.
- October 31: President Johnson orders a halt to the aerial bombing of North Vietnam.
- November 5: Former Vice President Richard Milhous Nixon, who served during the Administration of Dwight David Eisenhower from 1953 to 1961, defeats both the sitting Vice President Hubert Humphrey and the far-right George Wallace/Curtis Lemay independent ticket in a close race. Nixon in January becomes the 37th president of the United States, ending eight years of Democratic Party control of the White House.
- November 6: Head: The Monkees delve into psychedelia in an ambitious but unpromoted and little-seen film co-written and co-produced by Jack Nicholson.
- November 6: Students demanding minority studies courses begin a strike at San Francisco State College, where demonstrations and clashes last into March 1969, making it the longest student strike in American history.
- November 11: Two Virgins: John Lennon and Yoko Ono's experimental album is released. Beatles distributors EMI (for Parlophone/Gramophone labels) and Capitol (for the group's Apple vanity label) refuse distribution of the recording, as the cover features the couple with no clothes on at all. Lennon later describes the cover, considered obscene by general American moral standards of the time, as a "depiction of two slightly overweight ex-junkies."
- November 22: The Beatles' self-titled double album, also known as the "White Album," is released. Band members grow their hair very long, and the musical content moves away from psychedelia.
- December 24: Earthrise: A striking photograph of the Earth taken by Bill Anders of Apollo 8 from lunar orbit is called "the most influential environmental photograph ever taken."

=== 1969 ===
- January 8–18: Students at Brandeis University occupy Ford and Sydeman Halls, demanding creation of an Afro-American department, which is approved by the University on April 24.
- January 28: Santa Barbara Oil Spill: The environmental movement moves into high gear after an offshore oil well blows out and dumps 100,000 barrels of crude oil onto the California coast, killing wildlife and fouling beaches for years to come.
- January 29: Sir George Williams Computer Riot: the largest student campus occupation in Canadian history results in millions of dollars in damage in Montreal.
- January 30: Let it Be: The Beatles, plus Billy Preston, perform in public as a group for the last time on the roof atop their offices in London. Footage of the performance appears on the film documenting the sessions for the album.
- January 30 – February 15: The Administration building of University of Chicago is taken over by around 400 student protesters in a "sit-in".
- February: Esquire Magazine features a cover story declaring: "Chicks Up Front! How Troublemakers Use Girls to Put Down the Cops" and other tactics of the radical left.
- February 13: National Guard troops, armed with tear gas and riot sticks, crush demonstrations at the University of Wisconsin, Madison.
- February 16: After three days of clashes between police and Duke University students in North Carolina, the school agrees to establish a Black Studies program.
- February 24: Tinker v. Des Moines: The U.S. Supreme court affirms public school students' First Amendment rights to protest the Vietnam War.
- March 1: Do You Want to See My Cock?: Arrest warrants are issued for Doors frontman Jim Morrison after he allegedly exposes himself and simulates masturbation and fellatio at a concert in Miami, Florida. In 2010, Morrison is posthumously pardoned by the state's Clemency Board.
- March 12: George Harrison and Pattie Boyd are arrested for marijuana possession in London.
- March 22: President Nixon condemns trend of campus takeovers and violence.
- March 25–31: Following their wedding at Gibraltar, John Lennon and Yoko Ono hold a "bed-in" peace event in Amsterdam.
- April: American troop strength in Vietnam peaks at over 543,000 military personnel.
- April 3–4: The National Guard is called into Chicago, and Memphis residents are placed on curfew on the first anniversary of Martin Luther King, Jr.'s assassination.
- April 4: After a decline in ratings and ongoing pressure by advertisers and the general public over the program's highly controversial content, CBS cancels the Smothers Brothers Comedy Hour. Writers for the program, including Mason Williams, Carl Gottlieb, Bob Einstein, Rob Reiner, Steve Martin, and Pat Paulsen, move on to other projects.
- April 9: Three hundred students "sit-in" at offices of Harvard University protesting the presence of an ROTC program on campus. Four hundred policemen restore order on April 10. The university makes ROTC an extracurricular activity, rather than a mandatory curriculum, on April 19.
- April 19: Armed black students take over Willard Straight Hall at Cornell University in Ithaca, New York. The university accedes to their demands the following day, promising an Afro-American studies program.
- April 25–28: Activist students takeover Merrill House at Colgate University, demanding Afro-American studies programs.
- May 7: Students at Howard University in Washington, D.C., a historically black college, occupy eight buildings. The buildings are cleared by U.S. Marshals two days later.
- May 8: City College of New York closes following a 14-day-long student takeover demanding minority studies; riots among students break out when CCNY tries to reopen.
- May 9–11: Zip to Zap: Several thousand college students flock to a party event in rural North Dakota, which degenerates into a "riot" later dispersed by the National Guard.
- May 15: Bloody Thursday: Alameda County Sheriff's deputies and National Guardsmen authorized by governor Ronald Reagan move to eject protestors deemed unlawful from the People's Park in Berkeley. Law enforcement and soldiers open fire with buckshot-loaded shotguns, mortally wounding student James Rector, permanently blinding carpenter Alan Blanchard, and inflicting lesser wounds on several others.
- May 21–25: 1969 Greensboro uprising: student protesters battle police for five days on campus of North Carolina Agricultural and Technical State University; one student is killed on May 22. National Guardsmen assault the campus using tear gas, going so far as to drop it by helicopter.
- May 23: Tommy: The Who's Rock Opera becomes one of the most celebrated albums of the era.
- May 26 – June 2: Give Peace a Chance: Celebrities gather at the Queen Elizabeth Hotel in Montreal as John and Yoko conduct their second bed-in, where the anti-war anthem is recorded live.
- June: Everything You Always Wanted to Know About Sex* (*But Were Afraid to Ask) is published and becomes a bestseller.
- June 18: Students for a Democratic Society convenes in Chicago; the groups ousts its Progressive Labor Party faction on June 28, which, in turn, sets up its own rival convention.
- June 22: Judy Garland, superstar of stage, screen, television, and song, and an early icon for the LGBT community, dies of an accidental barbiturate overdose in the Chelsea section of London.
- June 28: The Stonewall Riots in New York City, provoked by an erstwhile routine police raid, are the first major gay-rights uprisings in the U.S.
- July 3: Brian Jones, founder of the Rolling Stones, dies "by misadventure" in his swimming pool in East Sussex, England under undetermined circumstances at age 27.
- July 5: The Stones in the Park: Shocked by the overdose death of former bandmate Brian Jones, the grieving Rolling Stones continue with their much-anticipated free concert before a massive crowd at Hyde Park in London.
- July 14: Easy Rider: A low-budget, cocaine-dealing biker road movie is released and becomes a de facto cultural landmark. The film's success helps open doors for independent filmmakers during the 1970s. The soundtrack includes Steppenwolf's seminal ode to bikers, "Born to be Wild," and an early anti-drug dirge, "The Pusher."
- July 15: Cover story on LOOK: "How Hippies Raise their Children"
- July 18: Cover story on Life: "The Youth Communes – New Way of Living Confronts the U.S."
- July 20: Apollo 11's Apollo Lunar Module Eagle lands. Humans walk on the Moon. A plaque with the inscription "We Came in Peace for All Mankind" is left by astronauts Buzz Aldrin and Neil Armstrong on the lunar surface.
- July 21: Andy Warhol's Blue Movie premieres at the New Andy Warhol Garrick Theatre. The movie becomes a seminal film in the Golden Age of Porn and helps inaugurate the "porno chic" phenomenon in modern American culture, and later, in many other countries throughout the world.
- July 25: Vietnamization: The U.S. President's Nixon Doctrine calls on Asian regional allies, who were formerly guaranteed protection under treaty, to fend for themselves in non-nuclear conflicts. This ostensibly is part of a campaign directed at reducing domestic tension and violence at home.
- August 9–10: Helter Skelter: Actress Sharon Tate, Tate's unborn baby, and five others are viciously murdered at knifepoint by cult members acting under the direction of psychopath Charles Manson during a two-day killing spree in California. The events shock an already-overwhelmed nation. As such, many see the crimes and Manson's "family" as products of the counterculture.
- August 15–18: Woodstock: An estimated 300,000–500,000 people gather in upstate New York for a festival of "3 Days of Peace & Music," a watershed event in American youth culture.
- August 19: Immediately following Woodstock, David Crosby, Stephen Stills, Joni Mitchell and Jefferson Airplane appear on the Dick Cavett Show. The Airplane's lyric "Up against the wall, motherfuckers!" in the performance of its "We Can Be Together" slips past ABC censors and airs on national television.
- August 30–31: The Second Isle of Wight Festival attracts 150,000 people to see acts including Bob Dylan and The Band, The Who, Free, Joe Cocker, and the Moody Blues.
- September: Penthouse: The first U.S. issue of Robert Guccione's explicit monthly magazine hits newsstands, and is later called "the adult magazine that wormed its way into the kinkier recesses of the libidinal subconscious and, arguably, did more to liberate puritan America from its deepest sexual taboos than any magazine before or since."
- September 1–2: Race rioting in Hartford, Connecticut and Camden, New Jersey takes place.
- September 2: Ho Chi Minh, President of Communist North Vietnam, aggressor and prime mover of the Second Indochina War, dies. Ho's war rages on after his death, with his subjects refusing to be demoralized by the death.
- September 6: H.R. Pufnstuf: a highly novel, surreal Saturday morning children's show debuts on American television.
- September 24: The Chicago Eight trial commences. Rennie Davis, David Dellinger, Tom Hayden, Abbie Hoffman, Jerry Rubin et al. face charges, including a conspiracy to incite riots during the 1968 Democratic National Convention. They become the Chicago Seven on November 5 after defendant Bobby Seale is bound, gagged, and severed from the proceedings.
- September 29: "Okie from Muskogee": Country music legend Merle Haggard's song is a huge hit with rural, blue-collar, and religious Americans (primarily Southerners and Midwesterners) opposed to drug use among young people and the protest activities of the counterculture. Personally, Haggard neither affirmed nor denied the perceived jingoistic and conservative politics contained within the lyrics during his lifetime.
- October 4: Television personality Art Linkletter's daughter Diane, 20, jumps to her death from the sixth story of an apartment building. The elder Linkletter, an outspoken political conservative, claimed for years that Timothy Leary and LSD were responsible.
- October 8–11: Days of Rage: Elements of the SDS and the Weather Underground faction continue radical efforts to "bring the war home" in Chicago, and exchange brutalities with Chicago Police.
- October 15: Moratorium to End the War in Vietnam: Massive anti-war demonstrations occur across the U.S. and worldwide.
- October 21: Jack Kerouac dies from complications of alcoholism in Florida at age 47.
- October 29: "login": The first message on the ARPANET – precursor to the internet and World Wide Web – is sent by UCLA student programmer Charley Kline.
- November 13: Vice President Spiro T. Agnew publicly criticizes the three mainstream television networks for a supposed bias against the Administration because they are perceived by him and President Nixon to hold sympathy with liberal and radical causes. That narrative developed steadily in American conservative circles over the next 50 years, eventually engendering by the 2000s a separate news culture, enabled mostly by technologies such as cable television and the internet that displaced traditional providers of American journalism.
- November 15: Moratorium redux: over 500,000 march in Washington, D.C. It is the largest anti-war demonstration in American history.
- November 20: Native American protesters begin the Occupation of Alcatraz, which continues for 19 months.
- December: Total U.S. casualties (dead and seriously wounded) in Vietnam total some 100,000.
- December 1: The first draft lottery in the U.S. since World War II is held in New York City and broadcast live on CBS television. Later statistical analysis indicates that the lottery method (birthdates in capsules pulled from a hand-rotated drum) is flawed, leaving certain birth dates more likely to be drawn than others.
- December 4: Black Panther Fred Hampton is killed by combined elements of Federal, Illinois, and Chicago law enforcement under circumstances which, to some, suggest political assassination.
- December 6: Altamont: The Rolling Stones help organize and headline at a free concert attended by 300,000. The event, intended as a "Woodstock West," devolves into chaos and the killing of one young person at a speedway between Tracy and Livermore, California. Improper and capricious security enforcement by the Hells Angels is partly blamed for the incident.
- December 27–31: Flint War Council, Michigan. The SDS is abolished, with the Weathermen becoming autonomous, and one of the most significant seditious revolts since the American Civil War emerges.
- Wavy Gravy's Hog Farm Hippie commune is established near Llano, New Mexico.
- Friends of the Earth is founded in the U.S. It becomes an international network in 1971.
- Making of a Counter Culture: Theodore Roszak's Reflections on the Technocratic Society is published. Roszak is later credited with coining the term "counterculture" in print.

== 1970s ==
=== 1970 ===
- President Nixon establishes the Environmental Protection Agency (EPA). The agency is activated in December 1970.
- January 1: The voting age in Britain is lowered from 21 to 18.
- January 10: Musician, hippie, and philanthropic margarine heir Michael J. Brody Jr. announces he will give away his fortune, which he reports to be between $25 and 50 million.
- January 31: Set Up, Like a Bowling Pin: Nineteen people, including members of the Grateful Dead and Owsley Stanley, are busted for drug possession in New Orleans. The episode makes the cover of Rolling Stone in March, and is later referred to in the Dead song "Truckin' ".
- February: Weather Underground carries out bombings and arson in the U.S. states of New York, California, Washington, Maryland, and Michigan.
- February 18: The Chicago 7 verdicts are handed down: two are exonerated and five are soon sentenced for "crossing state lines with intent to incite a riot." However, all the convictions and sentences are later reversed.
- February 23–26: Students riot at the University of California-Santa Barbara.
- February 25–28: Students riot and occupy campus buildings at SUNY Buffalo, in New York state.
- March 6: Greenwich Village townhouse explosion: Three members of the Weather Underground are killed while assembling a bomb in New York City.
- March 26: The documentary film Woodstock is released.
- Late March: Fleetwood Mac founder Peter Green and bandmate Danny Kirwan get waylaid at a bizarre party at the Highfisch-Kommune cult/commune in Munich. After apparently taking LSD, both Green and Kirwan thereafter reportedly suffer from lifelong mental illness.
- April 1: Jerry Rubin guest appears on the Phil Donahue Show and lambastes Donahue on air for his conservative appearance.
- April 7: California Governor Ronald Reagan is quoted on his views concerning college campus student unrest: "If it takes a bloodbath, let's get it over with."
- April 7: An X-rated film, Midnight Cowboy, wins three Oscars, including Best Picture in Hollywood.
- April 10: Paul McCartney, when promoting his first solo album, announces that the Beatles have disbanded.
- April 15: One hundred thousand persons gather on Boston Common to protest the Vietnam War; about 500 radicals attempt to seize the microphone, disrupting the event.
- April 22: Earth Day: The first event recognizing the precarious environmental state of planet earth is held. It is commemorated annually to this day.
- April 30: President Nixon reveals secret American military operations in Cambodia, next door to Vietnam. That nation underwent a coup d'état in March when its monarch, accused by the military and conservative subjects of tolerating North Vietnamese and Viet Cong within its borders, was deposed by a renegade general, who initiates a civil war against Cambodian Communists, known as the Khmer Rouge, and the foreign occupants that lasts until 1975, when the KR overthrows the regime just days before the Fall of Saigon in Vietnam. America pledges its support to the authoritarian government of Lon Nol.
- May 1–3: Thirteen thousand people take part in peaceful demonstrations at Yale University in support of defendants in the New Haven Black Panther trials.
- May 2: Radicals among students at Kent State University in Ohio protesting the spread of the war into Cambodia burn the ROTC building to the ground. Governor Jim Rhodes calls in the National Guard at the request of Kent's mayor.
- May 4: In what becomes the greatest tragedy of the stateside anti-war protest movement and marks the beginning of the decline of the New Left in the United States, poorly trained soldiers of the Ohio National Guard are set loose into confrontation with – and open fire on – unarmed students at Kent State University, leaving four dead and nine wounded, including one man, Dean Kahler, who was paralyzed.
- May 4: Holding Together: A benefit for Timothy Leary is held at the Village Gate in New York City. Jimi Hendrix and Johnny Winter perform.
- May 5: The International Nuclear Nonproliferation Treaty takes effect.
- May 6: Student Strike of 1970: Many colleges across the U.S. shut down in protest against the continued American presence in Vietnam and the Kent State events.
- May 8: Hard Hat Riot: Socially conservative construction workers, erstwhile loyal labor union members and supporters of liberal economic policies in past decades, confront anti-war demonstrators on Wall Street in New York City. They march again on May 11. On May 20, some 100,000 construction workers and longshoremen demonstrate in favor of Administration war policy at New York City Hall.
- May 8: Attempting to "rescue" his child from what he believes to be a hippie commune, a father, Arville Garland, murders his daughter Sandra and three others in their sleep in Detroit. The events are eerily similar to those depicted in the hippie-bashing film Joe, which was filmed prior to – but released after – the murders.
- May 9: 100,000 rally against the Vietnam War in Washington, D.C. At 4:15 a.m., President Nixon defies Secret Service forces and leaves the White House grounds to meet and talk with surprised protesters who are camping out at the Lincoln Memorial.
- May 14: Jackson State killings: Police kill two and injure 11 during violent student demonstrations at Jackson State College, in Mississippi. This occurs two days after six African-American men were fatally shot in the back for violating a city curfew in Augusta by the Georgia National Guard.
- May 19: Student riot at Fresno State University in California.
- May 21: 5,000 National Guard troops occupy Ohio State University following violence.
- June 11: Daniel Berrigan is arrested by the FBI on charges of conspiring to kidnap persons and detonate a bomb.
- June 12: Major League Baseball pitcher Dock Ellis takes LSD on what he mistakenly believes is an off day, and throws a no-hitter. Ellis later quits drugs, becomes a recovery counselor, and expresses regret over drug abuse during his playing career.
- June 13: President Nixon appoints the President's Commission on Campus Unrest. The report issued in September finds a direct correlation between the unrest and the level of American military involvement in Indochina.
- June 15: The U.S. Supreme Court confirms the legality of conscientious objector protection on moral grounds.
- June 22: The U.S. voting age is lowered to 18 by Congressional legislation. The measure is soon challenged and overturned in the Supreme Court, leading to the swift adoption of the 26th Amendment on June 1, 1971, guaranteeing suffrage at 18 in Federal, state, and local elections taking place in all 50 states.
- June 27–28: The Bath Festival of Blues and Progressive Music happens at Shepton Mallet in Somerset, England, featuring Hot Tuna, Fleetwood Mac, Led Zeppelin, Pink Floyd and other acts.
- July: Huston Plan: A broad, cross-agency scheme for illegal domestic surveillance of anti-war figures is concocted by a White House staffer, and accepted but then quickly quashed by President Nixon. Elements of the plan were, however, allegedly implemented in any event.
- August 6: Riot police evacuate Disneyland in Anaheim, California after a few hundred Yippies stage a protest.
- August 17: Communist activist Angela Davis appears on the FBI's Ten Most Wanted list after a firearm purchased in her name is linked to a murder plot involving a judge.
- August 24: The Sterling Hall Bombing at the University of Wisconsin in Madison by anti-war activists kills physics researcher Robert Fassnacht. Four others are severely injured, and millions of dollars in damages occur.
- August 26: Women's Strike for Equality: 50 years after suffrage was granted to American women by an amendment to the Constitution, 20,000 celebrate and march in New York City, demanding true equality for women in American life.
- August 26–31: 600,000+ attend the Third Isle of Wight Festival in Great Britain. Over fifty acts, including The Who, Hendrix, Miles Davis, The Doors, Ten Years After, ELP, Joni Mitchell, and Jethro Tull play the event.
- August 29–30: Rioting and violence erupts at the Chicano Moratorium anti-war rally in Los Angeles; reporter Rubén Salazar is killed by a tear gas shell.
- September: Jesus Christ Superstar, a "Christian Rock Opera," debuts as an album. It later becomes a smash on Broadway and on film.
- September: Alan "Blind Owl" Wilson, who co-founded the rock group Canned Heat, dies of a prescription barbiturate overdose at Topanga Canyon, California, at age 27.
- September 12: Timothy Leary escapes prison with help from the Weather Underground, and joins Eldridge Cleaver in Algiers.
- September 16: London: The apolitical but stylistically pioneering hard rock act Led Zeppelin end the Beatles' eight-year run as Melody Maker's #1 group of the year.
- September 18: Influential musician Jimi Hendrix dies from complications of a probable drug overdose at age 27 in London.
- September 19: Pilton Pop, Blues & Folk Festival: The first ever Glastonbury Festival features T-Rex and is attended by 1,500 people.
- October: The Female Eunuch: Germaine Greer's pro-feminist bestseller is published.
- October: Keith Stroup founds NORML, a group working to end marijuana prohibition, in Washington, D.C.
- October 4: Janis Joplin, rock music's first solo female superstar, dies as the result of an apparent accidental heroin overdose at age 27 in Los Angeles.
- October 13: Political activist Angela Davis is arrested on kidnapping, murder, and conspiracy charges.
- October 26: Doonesbury debuts as a syndicated comic strip, acknowledges the counterculture, and continues to chronicle events into the 21st century.
- October 29: President Nixon is pelted with eggs by a hostile crowd of 2,000 after giving a speech in San Jose, California.
- November 7: Jerry Rubin appears live on The David Frost Show and tries to pass a marijuana joint to the talk show host, which becomes a cue for Yippies in the audience to rush the stage and protest.
- December 6: The Maysles Brothers release their film documentary of the December 1969 Rolling Stone Altamont incident, Gimme Shelter.
- December 21: Elvis Presley arrives unannounced at the White House. "The King" meets and is photographed with President Nixon. They discuss patriotism, hippies, and the war on drugs.
- December 25: Laguna Beach Christmas Happening: Thousands gather in Southern California for an extended hippie festival, featuring an airdrop of hundreds of Christmas cards, each containing a dose of "Orange Sunshine" LSD courtesy of The Brotherhood of Eternal Love, or the "Hippie Mafia," an acid-manufacturing and hash-smuggling organization bent on "psychedelic revolution."
- December: Paul McCartney sues to legally dissolve the Beatles.
- The violent Black Liberation Army is formed in the U.S. A series of bombings, murders, robberies, prison breaks, and an airline hijacking ensue before the group fades from view in the early 1980s.

=== 1971 ===
- January 1: Punishment Park is released in theaters.
- January 2: A ban on cigarette advertising on American television and radio takes effect. The measure, intended to discourage smoking, has a profound impact on the broadcasting business, causing many television stations in particular to lose revenue for the first time since their establishments in the 1950s and 1960s.
- January 12: Styled after the popular British television situation comedy Till Death Us Do Part, the long-running American smash All in the Family debuts on CBS with Rob Reiner as Michael Stivic, the counterculture's college-educated answer to the working-class "Silent Majority"/Nixon devotee Archie Bunker. The program soon becomes the nation's most popular, a status it holds for several years, and launches Norman Lear's career as a major producer of other successful comedies through the 1980s. At least one reference book calls it the most important show in U.S. television history that had aired up to that point.
- January 31: Police fire on participants in a peace march in Los Angeles, killing one.
- February 4: A military induction center in Oakland, California is bombed.
- February 4–8: Rioting in Wilmington, North Carolina, related to poor local implementation of school desegregation over the past 18 months or so leaves two dead.
- February 13: An induction center in Atlanta, Georgia is bombed.
- February 21: The United Nations Convention on Psychotropic Substances is signed in Vienna, with the intention of controlling psychoactive drugs such as amphetamines, barbiturates, benzodiazepines, and psychedelics at the international level.
- March 1: The U.S. Capitol building is bombed by war protesters; no injuries occurred, but extensive damage results. The incident, little reported in the media, disturbs the Nixon Administration enough to begin considering extra-legal measures to stop left-wing violence and repress political dissent.
- March 5: The FCC declares that it will penalize radio stations for playing music that seems to glorify or promote illegal drug usage.
- March 8: The Fight of the Century: Conscientious Objector and counterculture hero Muhammad Ali loses to the default symbol of the pro-war right, Joe Frazier, at Madison Square Garden in New York City, in what is widely considered to be the greatest heavyweight fight in boxing history.
- March 11: Rioting at the University of Puerto Rico leaves three dead.
- April 23: Some Vietnam veterans protest against the War at the U.S. Capitol, physically discard and throw their medals on the steps, and testify that the American military has, in the view, committed war crimes (see Vietnam Veteran Medal Throwing Protest).
- April 24: Approximately 500,000 protesters rally at the U.S. Capitol to petition for an end to the War; meanwhile, 200,000 rally against the War in San Francisco.
- May 3: Over 12,000 anti-War protesters are arrested on the third day of the 1971 May Day Protests in Washington, D.C.
- May 10: Attorney General John N. Mitchell compares the anti-War protesters to Nazis, and on May 13, denounces them as Communists.
- May 12: The wedding of Mick Jagger and Nicaraguan beauty Bianca Pérez-Mora Macias is celebrated by hippies and jet-setters alike, but is marred by a media circus involving fisticuffs at Saint-Tropez on the French Riviera. The couple breaks up in 1977.
- May 17: The play Godspell opens in New York, depicting Jesus and his disciples in a contemporary, countercultural milieu.
- May 21: Marvin Gaye releases the socially conscious album What's Going On, a drastic departure from his traditional soul-music themes of romance and African-American struggles.
- May 31: American military personnel stationed in London petition at the U.S. Embassy against the Vietnam War.
- June 13: Pentagon Papers: The New York Times publishes the first excerpt of illegally-leaked secret Department of Defense documents detailing American intervention in Indochina since 1945. A Federal court injunction on June 15 temporarily stops the releases.
- June 18: The Washington Post publishes excerpts from the Pentagon Papers, halted by a court order the following day.
- June 20–24 : 'Glastonbury Fayre', the second Glastonbury Festival, features David Bowie, Traffic, Fairport Convention, and the first incarnation of the "Pyramid Stage".
- June 22: The Boston Globe publishes the Pentagon Papers excerpts; this is also halted by an injunction on the 23rd, and the newspapers are impounded.
- June 28: Muhammad Ali's conviction for draft resistance is unanimously overturned by the U.S. Supreme Court.
- June 28: President Nixon releases all 47 volumes of the Pentagon Papers to the U.S. Congress.
- June 30: The Supreme Court rules 6–3 that newspapers have a right to publish the Pentagon Papers. The Times and Post resume publication the following day.
- July 3: Jim Morrison, founding member of The Doors, dies of a probable heroin overdose at age 27 in Paris.
- July 7: Two-Lane Blacktop: The cult classic starring Dennis Wilson and James Taylor premieres.
- August 1: Concert for Bangladesh: George Harrison and Ravi Shankar and friends including Ringo Starr, Eric Clapton, Leon Russell, Billy Preston and Bob Dylan stage a landmark charity event in New York City. Popular albums and a film follow, and the shows become a model for future huge rock benefit concerts such as 1985's Live Aid.
- August 18: Attorney General Mitchell announces that there will be no Federal investigation of the 1970 Kent State shootings.
- August: Cheech & Chong's eponymous first album is released.
- September 3: Burglars, later revealed to be operating under the direction of White House officials, break into the office of Daniel Ellsberg's psychiatrist, Dr. Lewis Fielding, in California in a botched attempt to locate files that might impugn and thus discredit the Pentagon Papers leaker.
- September 9: Attica: Prisoners take control, hold hostages and riot over perceived violations of their civil rights and poor living conditions at Attica State Prison in New York state. Thirty-nine persons die (including 10 corrections officers) before most prisoner demands are met and order is restored.
- September 15: Greenpeace is founded in Vancouver, British Columbia, Canada and soon becomes the most prominent, and most controversial, international activist environmental organization.
- October: est, the controversial self-improvement training program, holds its first conference in San Francisco.
- October 8: Three FBI informants reveal on a Public Broadcasting System television program that they were paid to infiltrate anti-War groups and instigate them to commit violent acts which could be prosecuted.
- October 19–23: Rioting in Memphis, Tennessee leaves one dead.
- October 29: Rock guitar phenomenon Duane Allman of the Allman Brothers Band is killed in a motorcycle accident in Macon, Georgia at age 24. Allman bassist Berry Oakley dies, also in a motorcycle crash, only blocks away the following year. The ABB is credited with founding the genre of Southern Rock, a mix of hard rock, blues, country, jazz, and gospel influences. It appeals primarily to Southern white teenagers as an alternative to their parents' typical preferences for country music and Northern and Western young people's fondness for musically sophisticated progressive rock. Future groups performing this style of music include Lynyrd Skynyrd, Wet Willie, the Marshall Tucker Band, and the Charlie Daniels Band.
- November 10: The Berkeley, California City Council votes to provide sanctuary to all military deserters.
- November 10: Ringo Starr and Keith Moon co-star with Frank Zappa and the Mothers of Invention in Zappa's "surrealistic documentary" 200 Motels.
- November 16: Socialite, early supermodel, and Andy Warhol "Superstar" Edie Sedgwick dies at 28 after an overdose of alcohol and barbiturates in Santa Barbara, California.
- November: Fear and Loathing in Las Vegas, Hunter S. Thompson's drug-drenched indictment of the 1960s counterculture, is published in Rolling Stone magazine in two parts. Thompson parlays the piece into a long career writing so-called "gonzo journalism."
- December 4: Smoke on the Water: Rockers Deep Purple are disrupted in the process of recording Machine Head when the hall they intend to use for recording is burned down by a fan during a Frank Zappa concert in Montreux, Switzerland.
- December 10: John Sinclair Freedom Rally: John Lennon and other notables including Stevie Wonder and Bob Seger perform, and Bobby Seale, Jerry Rubin, Allen Ginsberg, Rennie Davis, Ed Sanders and others speak at Crisler Arena in Ann Arbor, Michigan to protest the treatment of Sinclair, who inadvertently gave two marijuana joints to an undercover cop and was sentenced to 10 years in prison for the offense.
- December 26–28: 15 Vietnam veterans occupy the Statue of Liberty to protest the War's continuation after nearly seven years of active American involvement.
- December 28: Anti-War veterans attempt a takeover of the Lincoln Memorial in Washington, D.C., but 80 are arrested.
- December 29: Boys in the Sand, a milestone American gay pornographic film, presented at the beginnings of the Golden Age of Porn, premiers at the 55th Street Playhouse in New York City. Boys in the Sand was the first such film to be reviewed by Variety Magazine, and one of the earliest openly pornographic films, after 1969's Blue Movie by Andy Warhol, to gain mainstream appreciation.
- December: Feminism comes of age: Gloria Steinem's Ms. magazine is first published as an insert in New York magazine. The first stand-alone issue is released the following month.
- Stephen Gaskin establishes "The Farm" hippie commune in Lawrence County, Tennessee.
- Saul Alinsky's Rules for Radicals is published.
- Abbie Hoffman's Steal This Book is published.
- The Anarchist Cookbook is published.
- Our Bodies, Ourselves is published.
- Rainbow Bridge, Chuck Wein's film depicting the counterculture on Maui, and featuring the second-to-last live performance by Jimi Hendrix, is released.

=== 1972 ===
- February 1: The Needle and the Damage Done: Neil Young releases a moving musical testimonial of friends lost to deadly narcotics during the era. The growth of heroin use flattens out in the 1970s, but the drug is still considered "hip" and use explodes again among newer generations in the 1990s and beyond, who were unable to witness the original phenomenon.
- March: The Nixon Administration begins deportation proceedings against John Lennon, on the pretext of his 1968 hashish charge in London.
- March 22: The National Commission on Marihuana and Drug Abuse, appointed by President Nixon, finds "little danger" in cannabis and recommends abolition of all criminal penalties for possession. The advice is ignored by Federal officials, the Administration, and the Congress.
- April 1: The first Hash Bash is held on the campus of the University of Michigan in Ann Arbor.
- April 16: Facing heavy ground losses, American forces resume the bombing of North Vietnam.
- April 17–18: Students at the University of Maryland who protest the bombing do battle with the police and National Guardsmen are sent in to suppress the uprising.
- April 22: Large anti-War marches take place in New York, San Francisco, and Los Angeles.
- May 2: Federal Bureau of Investigation Director J. Edgar Hoover dies at 77, after nearly 50 years of him having virtually unchallenged control over the principal Federal law enforcement agency, with even Presidents deferring to his authority.
- May 15: Wallace Shot: Segregationist 1968 Presidential candidate and Alabama Governor George Wallace is shot and paralyzed at a Presidential primary campaign event in Laurel, Maryland, a suburb of Washington, D.C., by a young Milwaukee, Wisconsin man, Arthur Bremer, who had undetermined motives. Wallace was running as a Democrat in that primaries for the 1972 race; the Maryland primary was to take place the next day. Although he recovers and makes a final attempt at a Presidential run in 1976, the incident effectively ends his national political career. He goes on to re-election in Alabama for two more terms, in 1974 and 1982.
- May 19: A Weather Underground bomb at the Pentagon causes damage but no injuries.
- May 21–22: Fifteen thousand persons demonstrate in Washington against the War.
- June 4: Angela Davis is acquitted on all counts in her trial on weapons charges.
- June 12: John Lennon's Plastic Ono Band releases the politically charged double album Some Time in New York City.
- June 17: In a second attempt to obtain potentially damaging information on the Democratic Party that might benefit President Nixon's reelection campaign, five men are caught burglarizing the Party headquarters located in the Watergate office complex in Washington, D.C. All are arrested, and, initially, the story receives minimal notice from most national media.
- June 23: U.S. public schools can no longer require girls to wear dresses or skirts and must permit them to wear pants, by act of the Education Amendments of 1972. Disputes over proper student attire had been for some years a source of friction between young people and their parents and other authority figures.
- July 21: Comedian George Carlin is arrested at Summerfest in Milwaukee, Wisconsin, after performing his routine, "Seven Words You Can Never Say On Television," from his fourth stand-up album, Class Clown.
- July 28: Actress Jane Fonda visits North Vietnam. Fonda's return incites outrage among non-liberal Americans when a photograph of her seated on an enemy anti-aircraft gun is published, and she insists that Prisoners of Wars held captive have not been tortured or brainwashed by the communists. Fonda continues to this day to apologize for aspects of the episode.
- July: The first Rainbow Gathering of the Tribes is held over four days in Colorado.
- October 26: October Surprise?: U.S. National Security Advisor Henry Kissinger tells a White House press conference that "we believe that peace is at hand" in Indochina.
- November 2–8: Bureau of Indian Affairs building takeover: About 500 protesters from the American Indian Movement take over the U.S. Bureau of Indian Affairs in Washington.
- November 7: Republican Richard Nixon is re-elected in a landslide over left-wing Democratic Senator George McGovern of South Dakota.
- November 16: Police kill two students during campus rioting at the historically black Southern University in Baton Rouge, Louisiana.
- November 21: A Federal Appeals Court overturns the conviction of the "Chicago 7" indicted for rioting near the 1968 Democratic National Convention.
- December 18–29: Operation Linebacker II (a/k/a the "Christmas Bombings of 1972") becomes the most intensive bombing campaign of the war. President Nixon orders it with the aim of coercing North Vietnam to the negotiating table at the Paris Peace Accords, but some critics see his action as a flexing of political muscle to intimidate his domestic opponents, in light of his overwhelming victory some weeks earlier.
- The Joy of Sex: Unthinkable a decade earlier, the widely read sex manual for the supposedly liberated 1970s is published and openly displayed in mainstream bookstores.
- Michael X, a self-styled black revolutionary and civil rights activist in 1960s London, is convicted of murder. He is executed by hanging in Port of Spain, Trinidad and Tobago in 1975.

=== 1973 ===
- January 1: Bangladeshis burn down the U.S. Information Service in Dacca in protest against the "Christmas Bombing" of North Vietnam some days earlier.
- January 2: Aerial bombing of North Vietnam resumes after a 36-hour New Year's truce.
- January 4: Forty neutral member nations of the United Nations formally protest the American bombing campaign.
- January 5: Canada's Parliament votes unanimously to condemn the U.S. bombing actions and implores that the Nixon Administration cease them.
- January 10: Anti-War demonstrators attack the U.S. consulate in Lyon, France, and burn down the library of America House in Frankfurt, West Germany.
- January 10: The Environmental Protection Agency is sued by activists to force it to take action to begin reducing the permissible amount of tetraethyl lead in gasoline; David Schoenbrod of the Natural Resources Defense Council successfully wins the case on appeal.
- January 15: Anti-War protesters occupy the American consulate in Amsterdam.
- January 15: President Nixon suspends the bombing, citing progress in the peace talks with Hanoi. West German Chancellor Willy Brandt warns Nixon that U.S. relations with Western Europe are at risk if he continues aggression against North Vietnam.
- January 22: Former U.S. President Lyndon Baines Johnson dies at age 64 after suffering a heart attack at his Texas ranch.
- January 22: The Supreme Court hands down the landmark Roe v. Wade ruling, invalidating numerous state laws against abortion and declaring the procedure a Constitutional right for women, based on a fundamental concern for privacy between consenting adults. Some believe the decision to represent the apex of the Sexual Revolution, and immediately, numerous conservative religious bodies, namely the Roman Catholic Church and, later, fundamentalist Protestants, begin advocacy, both peaceful and violent, for the decision's repeal or else an amendment to the Constitution banning the procedure. Over the next 49 years, the decision stays in effect despite some serious modifications, until June 2023, when a strongly anti-feminist Court overturns the decision in Dobbs v. Jackson Women's Health Organization, a ruling that directly attacks the legal reasoning of Roe.
- January 28: American combat military involvement in Vietnam ends with a ceasefire and commencement of withdrawal as called for under the Paris Peace Accords.
- February 27 – May 8: Wounded Knee incident: Native American activists occupy the town of Wounded Knee, South Dakota; two protesters and one Federal Marshal are killed during a lengthy standoff.
- March: The first military draftees who are not subsequently called to service are selected, unceremoniously ending the Vietnam era of conscription in the US.
- March 8: Ron "Pigpen" McKernan, a founding member of the Grateful Dead, dies of a gastrointestinal hemorrhage at age 27 in Corte Madera, California. McKernan was known to have a serious drinking problem.
- March 29: War Ends: President Nixon announces that the last American combat troops have departed Vietnam, and U.S. POWs have been released.
- May 17: The Senate Watergate Committee begins televised hearings on the ever-growing Watergate scandal implicating the President for gross abuses of power. The matter is thrust into national attention thanks to tireless reportage by The Washington Post's Carl Bernstein and Bob Woodward, two beat reporters for the paper who happened to get the first "scoop" on the June 1972 story. Their leads uncovered trails of involvement in the affair by President Nixon's 1972 campaign arm.
- July 1: The Drug Enforcement Administration supplants the BNDD.
- July 4: Willie Nelson stages his first annual Fourth of July Picnic at Hurlbut Ranch near Dripping Springs, Texas. Inspired by the 1972 Dripping Springs Reunion, the concert features performances by Nelson, Waylon Jennings, Kris Kristofferson, Rita Coolidge, Leon Russell, John Prine, Doug Sahm, and other musicians. An estimated 50,000 people attended the gathering, which brung together hippies, cowboys, and followers of the emerging progressive country movement which had never been done before to that point. The event would go on to become an important annual gathering for outlaw country and the Texas countercultural music scene.
- July 10: John Paul Getty III, 16, the grandson of miserly oil billionaire and the world's richest man, Jean Paul Getty, is kidnapped for ransom in Rome. The negotiated payment of about $3 million is only made after the junior Getty's ear is excised and mailed back to a newspaper. The youth survives, but becomes a drug addict and stroke victim, and dies in 2011 at age 54.
- July 28: The Summer Jam at Watkins Glen, New York draws a crowd of 600,000 to see the Grateful Dead, The Band, and the Allman Brothers – the largest rock concert in the U.S. since the 1969 Woodstock festival.
- August 15: All American military involvement in Indochina conflict officially ends under the Case–Church Amendment. Two years later, invocation of the law by an overwhelmingly Democratic Congress, would constrain President Gerald Ford from sending military financial aid and weaponry to South Vietnam in order to save the nation from falling to the North in April 1975.
- September 19: In one of the most bizarre series of events of the era, celebrated journeyman country rock musician Gram Parsons dies of a morphine overdose after visiting Joshua Tree National Monument; his body is "stolen" by well-meaning friends attempting to fulfill Parson's funerary wishes and set afire at Joshua Tree. A film account of the misadventures is released in 2003.
- September 20: Folk-rock singer-songwriters Jim Croce and Maury Muehleisen are killed along with five others after their chartered tour plane crashes shortly after takeoff in Louisiana. Croce is at the height of his popularity at the time of the fatality, and further songs of his are released posthumously during 1974.
- September 20: The Battle of the Sexes: In a match heavily hyped by the media and promoted as a sports battle between male and female, tennis champions Billie Jean King and Bobby Riggs compete at the Astrodome. King defeats Riggs in three straight sets.
- October 10: In a matter related to corrupt conduct while serving as Governor of Maryland and unrelated to the Watergate drama, Vice President Spiro Agnew resigns his office in a plea deal to avoid a Federal prison sentence for bribery. Agnew is only the second American Vice President to depart his position before the end of a term; John C. Calhoun was the first, in the 19th century. Reflecting his precarious political position and thus inability to nominate a strongly partisan and conservative Republican replacement due to almost-certain Democratic opposition, President Nixon names Congressman Gerald R. Ford of Michigan, the Minority Leader in the U.S. House of Representatives and someone who worked well with members of both parties, on October 12.
- October 23: Congress begins to consider articles of impeachment against Nixon in response to the "Saturday Night Massacre" several days earlier, where Watergate Special Prosecutor Archibald Cox and several underlings are either fired or resign in succession. Cox and his staff had been pressing Nixon strongly to release secretly-made audio recordings made while he and his staff were discussing the implications of the Watergate affair during the Summer of 1972. The episode turns even hard-line Nixon supporters who readily supported him barely a year earlier against him, and public support for the Administration drops drastically, coinciding with a series of domestic and international crises, including the Yom Kippur War and consequent Oil Shortage of 1973 that would bring the American post-World War II prosperity to an ignoble end.
- November 14: Greece: Students at Athens Polytechnic strike against the military junta. Tanks roll the 17th and at least 24 die.
- November 17: At a session with 400 Association Press editors who practically harass him over his alleged attempt to cover up involvement in the Watergate matter, President Nixon defensively proclaims, "People have got to know whether or not their President is a crook. Well, I'm not a crook. I've earned everything I've got."

=== 1974 ===
- Saddled by a decade of drug-related legal problems, Timothy Leary reportedly becomes an informant for the FBI.
- January 3: A Federal judge dismisses charges against 12 members of the Weathermen involved in the October 1969 "Days of Rage".
- February 5: Patty Hearst, an heiress to the Hearst family fortune of San Francisco, is kidnapped by the far-left extremist group the Symbionese Liberation Army (SLA) and, shockingly to the American public, eventually identifies with them and their aims, possibly after becoming a victim of Stockholm syndrome.
- March–April: The short-lived fad of "streaking" (running in public while naked) reaches its height in the U.S.
- April 20: Disco music, following the success of The O'Jays' "Love Train" and Harold Melvin and the Blue Notes' "The Love I Lost" a year earlier, again hits number one on the Billboard charts with the instrumental "TSOP", a clear sign that the post-"sixties counterculture" era is now at hand. At another end of the musical spectrum, with a following largely among jaded college-educated white youngsters on the coasts, the punk rock subculture traces its genesis to around this time, with groups like Ramones and Television playing the CBGB club in New York City. About two and a half years later, several British acts, most notably the Sex Pistols, attract widespread attention with their rapid-speed music featuring abrasive or even offensive lyrics, a movement that runs until about 1980.
- May 17: Five SLA members, including their leader, are killed fighting police during a standoff in Los Angeles.
- Summer: The first issue of High Times, a magazine celebrating cannabis culture, is published.
- July 29: Singing star "Mama" Cass Elliot, 32, dies after a heart attack in the London flat of Harry Nilsson. The Who drummer Keith Moon, also 32, dies from overdosing on an anti-alcoholism drug in the same home in 1978.
- August 5: Having lost a long battle with the Supreme Court and Federal attorneys to keep from releasing incriminating information that indicates that he directed the CIA to have the FBI refrain from investigating the burglary of the Democratic Party National Headquarters in June 1972, President Nixon is forced to admit his complicity in the matter when the recording disclosing the instruction is released publicly. Almost all his remaining supporters in the U.S. Congress desert him upon the revelation of the new information and demand that he leave office as soon as possible.
- August 8: Facing imminent impeachment from representatives and certain impeachment from senators, Richard Milhous Nixon announces his resignation as President of the United States, the first (and to date, only) ever to do so, from the White House on television and radio that evening.
- August 9: Nixon returns to his California home as a private citizen (effected when Secretary of State Henry Kissinger receives his formal letter of resignation at approximately 11:35 a.m. Eastern Time). Thirty minutes later, in the White House East Room, Gerald Ford is sworn in as president and declares in his inaugural speech that "our long national nightmare is over." Ford is the only person to have occupied the White House without actually running for either that office or that of the Vice Presidency. His last election was to a final term for his U.S. House district in Michigan in 1972, and he had, in years past, set his hopes on becoming Speaker of the House of Representatives should the Republican Party assume control of that chamber in the future. He immediately declares rampant inflation, caused mostly by massive spending occurring during the Johnson years on both social programs and military operations abroad, as the nation's most serious problem.
- September–December: Police repeatedly quell unrest among white parents, mainly Irish-Americans, as desegregation comes to Boston public high schools. Many begin sending their children to parochial (Catholic) schools instead, or else they move to the area's suburbs, reflecting an increasing trend in much of metropolitan America at the time.
- September 8: In a decision that political observers retrospectively claim cost him any chance to obtain a full term in his own right in 1976, President Ford fully pardons former Richard Nixon during a surprise Sunday morning televised address, putting a final end to the Watergate saga outside the American judiciary. Charitable speculations abound that Ford wants desperately to deter a re-ignition of recently quelled social conflict in the country, while cynics, on the other hand, postulate that Ford and Nixon worked out a quid pro quo deal. The outrage on the part of many legislators spills over into the confirmation process for Nelson Rockefeller to become Ford's vice president; he is not confirmed and sworn in until a few days before Christmas, due to hypersensitivity over suspected corruption by Rockefeller (by Democrats especially) on certain business dealings.
- September 16: President Ford offers a conditional amnesty to military deserters and evaders of the Vietnam-era draft, creating a possible path for the re-entry of some into the U.S.
- December 13: President Ford invites George Harrison to a luncheon at the White House, a sign of the "Establishment's" increasing acceptance of the youth culture of recent years. Another British rock star, Peter Frampton, would pay a visit in 1976.
- December 21: The New York Times reports that the Central Intelligence Agency illegally spied on 10,000 anti-War dissidents during Nixon's presidency. Espionage on American citizens is directly prohibited by the CIA's charter.

=== 1975 ===
- January 1: In a special New Year's Day court session, John Mitchell and three other Watergate conspirators are found guilty and sentenced to prison on February 21.
- January 27: Church Committee: The U.S. Senate votes to begin unprecedented investigation into US intelligence activities, including illegal spying on domestic radicals. Democratic Senator Frank Church of Idaho is the chairman, and he has an overwhelmingly favorable Congress to work with due to the party's strong performance in the November 1974 midterm elections. The freshmen become collectively known as "Watergate Babies," and, along with President Ford, help to move American economic and foreign policy into a more libertarian direction, prizing recently won social freedoms but turning, at least rhetorically, against large-scale governmental spending and aggressive military activity abroad. Eventually, this develops through the presidency of Jimmy Carter and mutates into the neoliberal paradigm that dominates 1980s and 1990s Washington, from Ronald Reagan through George W. Bush.
- January 29: A Weather Underground bomb explodes at the U.S. State Department, but none were injured. This transpires to be the final significant incident of violence caused by the New Left.
- April 17: Cambodia Falls:
- April 30: Operation Frequent Wind: With the North Vietnamese and the Viet Cong openly violating the terms of the 1973 Paris Peace Accords under the realization that the U.S. would not come to the aid of South Vietnam due to overwhelming political opposition in light of Nixon's resignation and the Ford Administration's sharp focus on ridding America of high inflation, Communists begin steamrolling most of the country, which begins early in the year. Most of the populace and leaders in the South opt to abandon the nation to those forces rather than face certain death. Moving progressively southward, soldiers eventually reach Saigon by late April. President Ford orders help for the last remaining U.S. military and intelligence personnel to escape Saigon, in time before tanks approach the presidential palace and the South Vietnamese government surrenders, putting an end to a 21-year effort by the. Viet Minh to reunite the people under a Communist regime.
- September 5: Political Assassinations Briefly Return to Fashion: President Ford survives an assassination attempt by a devoteé of convicted murderer and cult leader Charles Manson, Lynette "Squeaky" Fromme, who seeks to draw attention to both his plight and her belief that American environmental policy did not sufficiently control industrial pollution. The incident occurs near a gathering of Republican businessmen in the California state capital of Sacramento; the industrialists are a target of Fromme's ire. Despite Fromme coming within inches of the President as he walks through downtown Sacramento greeting well-wishers along the way, her firearm fails on her, and she is immediately subdued and arrested by the Secret Service. She is convicted two months later and stays in prison until 2009.
- September 18: Patty Hearst is arrested by the FBI.
- September 22: Seventeen days after the botched Fromme attempt on President Ford's life, another California woman, Sara Jane Moore, makes an attempt in San Francisco.
- October 7: A New York State Supreme Court judge reverses the deportation order against John Lennon, allowing Lennon to legally remain in the U.S. Lennon would never again perform publicly. Yoko Ono did not perform publicly until after Lennon's death.
- October 11: Saturday Night Live: The counterculture comes of age as George Carlin hosts the first episode of the mainstream television revue, conceived as an experimental program to replace reruns of Johnny Carson's Tonight Show, which the talk show host demanded as a condition of renewing his contract with NBC. The series, still running as of 2023 after 48 seasons, soon features many notable American television firsts, including things like an open depiction of marijuana use in comedy sketches.

=== 1976 ===
- January 12: RCA Victor releases Wanted! The Outlaws, a compilation album featuring Waylon Jennings, his wife Jessi Colter, Willie Nelson, and Tompall Glaser. The album reaches No. 1 on the Billboard Top Country Albums chart whilst also becoming the first country music album to receive platinum certification, selling over one million copies. The commercial success of the album establishes outlaw country as the driving force in mainstream country music, demonstrating the then rapidly growing appeal of outsider artists who challenged Nashville's traditional recording methods and establishment.

=== 1977 ===
- January 21: Newly inaugurated US President Jimmy Carter unconditionally pardons thousands of Vietnam draft evaders, allowing them to re-enter the US, mostly from Canada.
- August 16: Elvis Presley, the most significant progenitor of the rock era, early critic of the counterculture, and biggest selling individual recording artist of all time dies at age 42 from complications of prescription drug abuse in Memphis, Tennessee.
- August 23: Waylon Jennings, along with associates Lori Evans, Mark Rothbaum, and Richie Albright are arrested at American Studios in Nashville, Tennessee by federal agents on cocaine possession and conspiracy charges, which are later dismissed.

== 1980s ==
=== 1980 ===
- December 8: John Lennon, 40, founding member of the Beatles and standard-bearer of the counterculture generation, is murdered in New York, triggering an outpouring of grief around the world.

== See also ==
- Counterculture of the 1960s
- Opposition to U.S. involvement in the Vietnam War: Timeline
  - List of protests against the Vietnam War
- Timeline of the civil rights movement
