= Love Pageant Rally =

The Love Pageant Rally took place on October 6, 1966—the day LSD became illegal—in the 'panhandle' of Golden Gate Park, a narrower section that projects into San Francisco's Haight-Ashbury district. The 'Haight' was a neighborhood of run-down turn-of-the-20th-century housing that was the center of San Francisco's counterculture in the 1960s.

The major organizers of the rally were Allen Cohen and artist Michael Bowen, the creators of the San Francisco Oracle, which first hit the streets in September 1966. The occasion was the banning of LSD, by the California legislature in Sacramento, an enactment which virtually created a neighborhood of outlaws in the Haight, where 'acid' was a staple of community culture. Since the new law was to go into effect on October 6, 1966, Cohen and others related the event to the number of the Beast of Revelation. On a more serious level, busts for drugs were ramping up locally and on the national level, and confrontations between the hippie communes and the local police were getting more intense and led to street protests and rioting, followed by neighborhood curfews. A better form of protest, more suited to hippie culture was needed.

"Without confrontation," said Allen Cohen, "we wanted to create a celebration of innocence. We were not guilty of using illegal substances. We were celebrating transcendental consciousness. The beauty of the universe. The beauty of being."

Posters advertising the event invited participants to "Bring the color gold... Bring photos of personal saints and gurus and heroes of the underground... Bring children... Flowers... Flutes... Drums... Feathers... Bands... Beads... Banners, flags, incense, chimes, gongs, cymbals, symbols, costumes, joy."

Thousands showed up for the event, read a "prophecy of a declaration of independence" written by Cohen, after which many placed a tab of acid on their tongues and swallowed in unison. Music was provided by the Grateful Dead and Janis Joplin, both invited to play by Michael Bowen for free. Ken Kesey was on hand with the Merry Pranksters in the legendary bus.

The Love Pageant Rally drew several thousand people. It was a warm-up for the Human Be-In the following January, which brought 30,000 together and established media attention to hippie culture that then led to The Summer of Love.
