= Human Be-In =

1967 countercultural gathering in San Francisco, California

- Part of the Hippie movement
- Poster advertising the 'Human Be-In', designed by Stanley Mouse (artist) and Michael Bowen (concept), using the photograph of artist Casey Sonnabend
- Date: January 14, 1967
- Location: San Francisco, United States
- Participants: Possibly 20,000–30,000 people
- Outcome: Inspiration for the Summer of Love

The Human Be-In was an event held in San Francisco's Golden Gate Park Polo Fields on January 14, 1967. It was a prelude to San Francisco's Summer of Love, which made the Haight-Ashbury district a symbol of American counterculture and introduced the word "psychedelic" to suburbia.

== Origins ==
=== Counterculture ===
The Human Be-In focused the key ideas of the 1960s counterculture: personal empowerment, cultural and political decentralization, communal living, ecological awareness, higher consciousness (with the aid of psychedelic drugs), acceptance of illicit psychedelics use, and radical New Left political consciousness. The hippie movement developed out of disaffected student communities around San Francisco State University, City College and Berkeley and in San Francisco's Beat Generation poets and jazz hipsters, who also combined a search for intuitive spontaneity with a rejection of "middle-class morality". Allen Ginsberg personified the transition between the beat and hippie generations.

=== Protests ===
The Human Be-In took its name from a chance remark by the artist Michael Bowen made at the Love Pageant Rally. The playful name combined humanist values with the scores of sit-ins that had been reforming college and university practices and eroding the vestiges of entrenched segregation, starting with the lunch counter sit-ins of 1960 in Greensboro, North Carolina, and Nashville, Tennessee. The first major teach-in had been organized by Students for a Democratic Society at the University of Michigan, 24–25 March 1965.

== Event ==
The Human Be-In was announced on the cover of the fifth issue of the San Francisco Oracle as "A Gathering of the Tribes for a Human Be-In". The occasion was a new California law banning the use of the psychedelic drug LSD that had come into effect on October 6, 1966. The speakers at the rally were all invited by Bowen, the main organizer. They included Timothy Leary in his first San Francisco appearance, who set the tone that afternoon with his famous phrase "Turn on, tune in, drop out" and Richard Alpert (soon to be known as "Ram Dass"), and poets like Allen Ginsberg, who chanted mantras, Gary Snyder and Michael McClure. Other counterculture gurus included comedian Dick Gregory, Lenore Kandel, Lawrence Ferlinghetti, Jerry Rubin, and Alan Watts. Music was provided by a host of local rock bands including Jefferson Airplane, Grateful Dead, Big Brother and the Holding Company, Quicksilver Messenger Service, and Blue Cheer, most of whom had been staples of the Fillmore and the Avalon Ballroom. "Underground chemist" Owsley Stanley provided massive amounts of his "White Lightning" LSD, specially produced for the event, as well as 75 twenty-pound (9 kg) turkeys, for free distribution by the Diggers. (Note: Ringolevio p. 274 – The turkeys had been made into thousands of sandwiches under John-John's supervision, and the bread was salted down with crushed acid. Gary organized the free distribution of the sandwiches to those who looked like they needed something to eat, physically or spiritually.)

The national media were stunned, publicity about this event leading to the mass movement of young people from all over America to descend on the Haight-Ashbury area. Reports were unable to agree whether 20,000 or 30,000 people showed up at the Be-In. Soon every gathering was an "-In" of some kind: Just four weeks later was Bob Fass's Human Fly-In, then the Love-In (March 26, 1967 at Elysian Park, Los Angeles), the Emmett Grogan inspired Sweep-In, Rowan and Martin's Laugh-In comedy television show began airing over NBC just a year later on January 22, 1968. This was followed by the first "Yip-In" (March 21, 1968, at Grand Central Terminal), another "Love-In" (April 14, 1968, at Malibu Canyon) and, John Lennon and Yoko Ono's "Bed-In" (March 25, 1969, in Amsterdam).

=== Inspiration ===
The Human Be-In was organized mainly by Bowen with the assistance of poet Allen Cohen in the organizational work. The idea of the Human Be-In was born of a fear that the movement would be erased due to tensions between factions of the Hippie movement. Bowen writes "The anti-war and free speech movement in Berkeley thought the Hippies were too disengaged and spaced out. Their influence might draw the young away from resistance to the war. The Hippies thought the anti-war movement was doomed to endless confrontations with the establishment which would recoil with violence and fascism". They decided to thus create 'A Gathering of the Tribes', as the event was advertised on posters later on. This event would use musical performances, group meditation and chanting sessions, political rallies, and speeches to inspire all the factions that they had all joined this movement because they had the same beliefs: peace, love for one another, and freedom. This would be the first moment of true unification within the Hippie Movement in its history.

== Legacy ==
The counterculture that surfaced at the "Human Be-In" encouraged people to "question authority" with regard to civil rights, women's rights, and consumer rights. Underground newspapers and radio stations served as its alternative media. (Note: Berkeley Barb, (Issue 73) – The two radical scenes are for the first time beginning to look at each other more closely. What both see is that both are under a big impersonal stick called The Establishment. So they’re going to stand up together in what both hope to be a new and strong harmony.)

A Human Be-In was put on in Denver, Colorado in September 1967 by Chet Helms and Barry Fey to harness the energy of the famed San Francisco event that occurred in January and promote their new Family Dog Productions venue, The Family Dog Denver. The event attracted 5,000 people and featured performances by Grateful Dead, Odetta and Captain Beefheart. Timothy Leary and Ken Kesey were said to have also been in attendance.

A "Digital Be-In" was produced in San Francisco from 1989 to 2008.

A UK theatre company, Theatre 14167 (ddmyy), (also 14167 films) takes its name from the date of the Be-In; the company subsequently produced work by Michael McClure, who read at the event.

== See also ==
- Bed-In
- Central Park be-in
- Teach-in
- Timeline of 1960s counterculture
