= Michael Bowen (artist) =

American fine artist

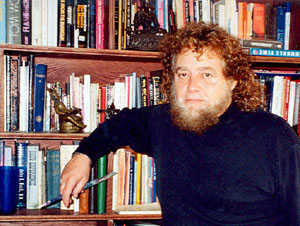
- Bowen in 1990
- Born: December 8, 1937; Beverly Hills, California, United States
- Died: March 7, 2009 (aged 71); Stockholm, Sweden
- Education: Chouinard Art Institute, Los Angeles
- Known for: Painting, performance art
- Notable work: Red future? (1959); LOVE portrait (1966); Human Be-In as performance art (1967)
- Movement: Visionary art
- Website: http://art.percepticon.com

Michael Francis Bowen (December 8, 1937 – March 7, 2009) was an American fine artist known as one of the co-founders of the late 20th and 21st century Visionary art movements. His works include paintings on canvas and paper, 92 intaglio etchings based on Jungian psychology, assemblage, bronze sculpture, collage, and handmade art books.

An icon of the American Beat Generation and the 1960s counterculture, Bowen is also known for his role in inspiring and organizing the first Human Be-In in San Francisco. Chronicled in books and periodicals reflecting on the turbulent 1960s, Bowen's historical impact on both the literary and visual art worlds is well documented. He remains influential among avant-garde art circles around the world.

== Early career in Los Angeles ==
Michael Bowen was born December 8, 1937, in Beverly Hills to Grace and Sterling Bowen. His father was a dentist. His mother's lover was Benjamin (Bugsy) Siegel, affectionately known as "Uncle Benjie", who would often take the youthful Bowen to not only the Flamingo Hotel on the Las Vegas Strip in Paradise, Nevada that he created, but also to the Sir Francis Drake Hotel near Union Square in downtown San Francisco. Bowen's early romance with San Francisco established this city as his home base from which he would frequently travel to other places in the world.

He started his art career at age 17, when he joined the installation artist Ed Kienholz in his Los Angeles studio. There he met and joined with other influential Beat Generation artists including Wallace Berman, John Altoon, and Dennis Hopper. Bowen participated in the construction of the Ferus Gallery and Now Gallery created by Ed Kienholz and curated by Walter Hopps. Bowen attended the Chouinard Art Institute for several years during his formative artistic experiences in Los Angeles.

=== Early mystical education ===
Bowen's grandmother, Alma Porter, was a member of The Theosophical Society in Ojai, California, where young Bowen was exposed to the significance of esoteric metaphysics and modern art. In Los Angeles, teenage Bowen's many visits to the mystical gatherings at Samson De Brier's house further solidified his early Asian philosophical studies.

In the late 50s and early 60s, Bowen continued his spiritual training and research. He investigated and practiced a variety of occult topics, Eastern philosophies, and mysticism, and his artwork reflected these themes. Bowen is often referred to as a mystic artist. As a lifelong student of the Bhagavad-Gita, Bowen's entire career emulated the spiritual warrior archetype of Arjuna, fighting for the Bill of Rights of the United States Constitution.

== San Francisco Beat Generation ==
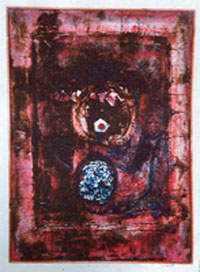
Red Future?, 1959

Michael Bowen moved to San Francisco in the late 1950s, and along with fellow artist comrades Arthur Monroe and Michael McCracken, lived and worked out of 72 Commercial Street. Painting spontaneous, impromptu, hectic canvases, along with assemblage and collage, Bowen became an integral part of the San Francisco Renaissance.

The Norwegian art patron and physician Reidar Wennesland befriended Bowen and many of his bohemian artist friends and collected their artwork. Bowen's work now makes up the majority of the paintings in the Wennesland Foundation Collection located in Kristiansand, Norway, alongside many other important North Beach artists, such as Jay DeFeo.

A 1963 painting of Janis Joplin by Bowen, along with his prophetic 1966 Love painting, are examples of the Bowen works in the Wennesland collection.

His style progressed from large abstract expressionist canvases to figuratives and large faces, to assemblage. Bowen's painting about McCarthyism, Red Future? from the Wennesland Collection, was featured in the 1995 Whitney Museum exhibition Beat Culture and the New America, 1950-1965, which opened in New York City, and then traveled to the Walker Art Center in Minneapolis and the De Young Museum in San Francisco, California.

== Exile from San Francisco ==
In 1963, police brutality and persecution drove many of the Beat Generation writers, musicians, and artists out of San Francisco. Michael Bowen, along with many of his artist friends moved to an old Abalone Factory in Princeton by the Sea, where they lived and painted for many months. Bowen's singer friend, Janis Joplin was a frequent guest at the Princeton Abalone studio.

In 1963, on one of Bowen's visits to be with his mentor in Tepoztlan, he was initiated into an ancient Aztec shamanic ceremony that inspired his future work with world consciousness transformation. After his initiation, Bowen traveled to New York City, where he established a studio on the Lower East Side and met with many of the Beat Generation artists, writers, and musicians living on America's East Coast. He often visited the two former Harvard professors Timothy Leary and Ram Dass, then Richard Alpert, in their mansion at Millbrook, New York, where a new variety of consciousness experimentations were being conducted.

== Haight-Ashbury and the Summer of Love ==
=== San Francisco Oracle and the Love Pageant Rally ===
In the summer of 1966, Bowen traveled back to San Francisco and established a studio/ashram in the middle of the newly burgeoning Haight-Ashbury neighborhood. Along with the poet Allen Cohen, Bowen co-founded the underground newspaper, San Francisco Oracle that broadcast the 60s counterculture ideology. Bowen became the art director and let his studio become the offices for the Oracle, while Cohen was the editor.

As the S.F. Oracle guru, Bowen hosted the first underground press meeting at his studio at Stinson Beach.

On October 6, 1966, Bowen and Cohen organized the Love Pageant Rally, a celebration against the new law criminalizing LSD in California. Because of Bowen's friendship and invitation, Janis Joplin came to the event along with her band, Big Brother and the Holding Company, and played for free. About 3,000 people attended the Love Pageant Rally, and towards the end, Ram Dass, Cohen, and Bowen discussed having another event, this time much bigger, to celebrate the newly developing hippie counterculture and consciousness expansion in San Francisco.

=== The Human Be-In ===
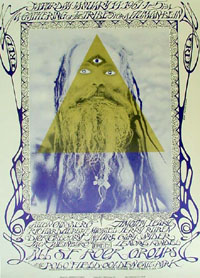
Human Be-In poster, 1967

The event the three counterculture leaders previously envisioned became the Human Be-In, which took place on January 14, 1967. The event was primarily organized by Bowen. He created the poster promoting the event, organized the city permit, invited the Beat Generation speakers, including Allen Ginsberg, Gary Snyder, Lenore Kandel, Michael McClure, and Timothy Leary, and scheduled the San Francisco rock bands, including The Grateful Dead and Jefferson Airplane, who played for free at the event. The Hells Angels provided security, and a flatbed truck with amplification driven by a gas generator was donated to create a stage. The Human Be-In was a coming together of people for no other reason than to just "BE"; to make love, not war, to share and commune with new friends and to celebrate life. The Human Be-In, sometimes referred to as a Love-In, was specifically designed by Bowen to be imitated and to be remembered into the future. As a lifelong fine artist, Bowen considered his creation of the Human Be-In to be performance art. This notion was confirmed by an Italian journalist, who calls Bowen "The father of performance art" for his Human Be-In creation.

== Flower Power ==
On October 21, 1967, 75,000 anti-war protesters surrounded the Pentagon in Washington D.C. On that day, Bowen organized 200 lbs. of daisies, purchased by his New York friend Peggy Hitchcock (wife of Walter Bowart) to be dropped from a light aircraft onto the Pentagon, but the FBI heard of the plan and seized the aircraft, so the flowers were distributed to the protesters as the military police protected the Pentagon from the massive anti Vietnam War demonstration. The daisies, brought to the front lines of the tense confrontation by Bowen and others, were taken by the demonstrators and put into the nearest holder that symbolically communicated their anti-war sentiment.

The iconic photograph "Flower Power", taken by photojournalist Bernie Boston, of the daisies being put into the bayoneted gun barrels of the soldiers by the unarmed anti-war demonstrators, was nominated for a Pulitzer Prize in 1968. The photograph "flower power" is listed as #30 among the top 100 wartime photographs and the idealism of flower power remains as an anti-war symbol.

== India and Nepal ==
In 1969, Bowen made his first pilgrimage to India and Nepal where he completed a series of drawings and sketches. These drawings were made into a book, Journey to Nepal, published by City Lights Books in 1970.

Throughout his five-decade career, many of the themes in Bowen's artworks represent sukhavati, the pure land or place of bliss. As a long-time student of Vedanta, Bowen's images are best understood through the lens of the ancient Dharmic Wisdom traditions of Asia.

In the early 1990s, Bowen found an abandoned cement traffic barrier in Golden Gate Park and claimed to have transformed it into a Shiva lingam. It then became a site of worship and veneration until the authorities had him remove it. At that time, he was known as Baba Kali Das.

== Personal life ==
Bowen married three times; the first marriage was to actress Sonia Sorel (1921–2004). The marriage ended in divorce. His second wife was Martine Algier. His third marriage, to Isabella Bowen, lasted until his death. He is survived by his sons, Ramakrishna and Indra, actor Michael Bowen Jr., and daughters Maitreya and Kaela.

== Death ==
Bowen died in Stockholm of complications of childhood polio on March 7, 2009.
