= Turn on, tune in, drop out =

Phrase attributed to Timothy Leary

"Turn on, tune in, drop out" is a counterculture-era phrase popularized by Timothy Leary in 1966.

== History of the phrase ==
Leary said the slogan was "given to him" by Marshall McLuhan during a lunch in New York City, he said in a 1988 interview with Neil Strauss. Leary said that McLuhan "was very much-interested in ideas and marketing, and he started singing something like, 'Psychedelics hit the spot / Five hundred micrograms, that's a lot,' to the tune of a Pepsi commercial of the time. Then he started going, 'Tune in, turn on, and drop out.'"

Leart used the phrase in a speech at the opening of a press conference in New York City on September 19, 1966. He urged people to embrace cultural changes through the use of psychedelics by detaching from the existing conventions and hierarchies in society. It was also the motto of his League for Spiritual Discovery.

In his speech, Leary said:

Like every great religion, we seek to find the divinity within and to express this revelation in a life of glorification and the worship of God. These ancient goals we define in the metaphor of the present—turn on, tune in, drop out.

It was also the title of his spoken word album recorded in 1966. On this album, Leary speaks in a monotone soft voice on his views about the world and humanity, describing nature, Indian symbols, "the meaning of inner life", the LSD experience, peace, and many other issues.

In 1967, Leary used the phrase during a speech at the Human Be-In, a gathering of 30,000 hippies in Golden Gate Park in San Francisco.

Leary explains in his 1983 autobiography Flashbacks:

Turn on meant go within to activate your neural and genetic equipment. Become sensitive to the many and various levels of consciousness and the specific triggers engaging them. Drugs were one way to accomplish this end.

Tune in meant interact harmoniously with the world around you—externalize, materialize, express your new internal perspectives.

Drop out suggested an active, selective, graceful process of detachment from involuntary or unconscious commitments. Drop Out meant self-reliance, a discovery of one's singularity, a commitment to mobility, choice, and change.

In public statements I stressed that the Turn On-Tune In-Drop Out process must be continually repeated if one wished to live a life of growth.

Unhappily my explanations of this sequence of personal development are often misinterpreted to mean "get stoned and abandon all constructive activity".

Turn on, Tune in, Drop out is also the title of a book (ISBN 1-57951-009-4) of essays by Timothy Leary, covering topics ranging from religion, education, and politics to Aldous Huxley, neurology, and psychedelic drugs.

In 1967, Leary (during the salon known as the Houseboat Summit) announced his agreement with a new ordering of the phrase as he said, "I would agree to change the slogan to 'Drop out. Turn on. Drop in.'"

By the early 1980s, while on a speaking tour with G. Gordon Liddy, the phrase had transformed to "turn on, tune in, take over."

During his last decade, Leary proclaimed the "PC is the LSD of the 1990s" and re-worked the phrase into "turn on, boot up, jack in" to suggest joining the cyberdelic counterculture.

== See also ==
- Eight-circuit model of consciousness
- Tang ping
- Freak-out (slang)
