= Red Dog Saloon (Virginia City, Nevada) =

Bar and music venue in the United States

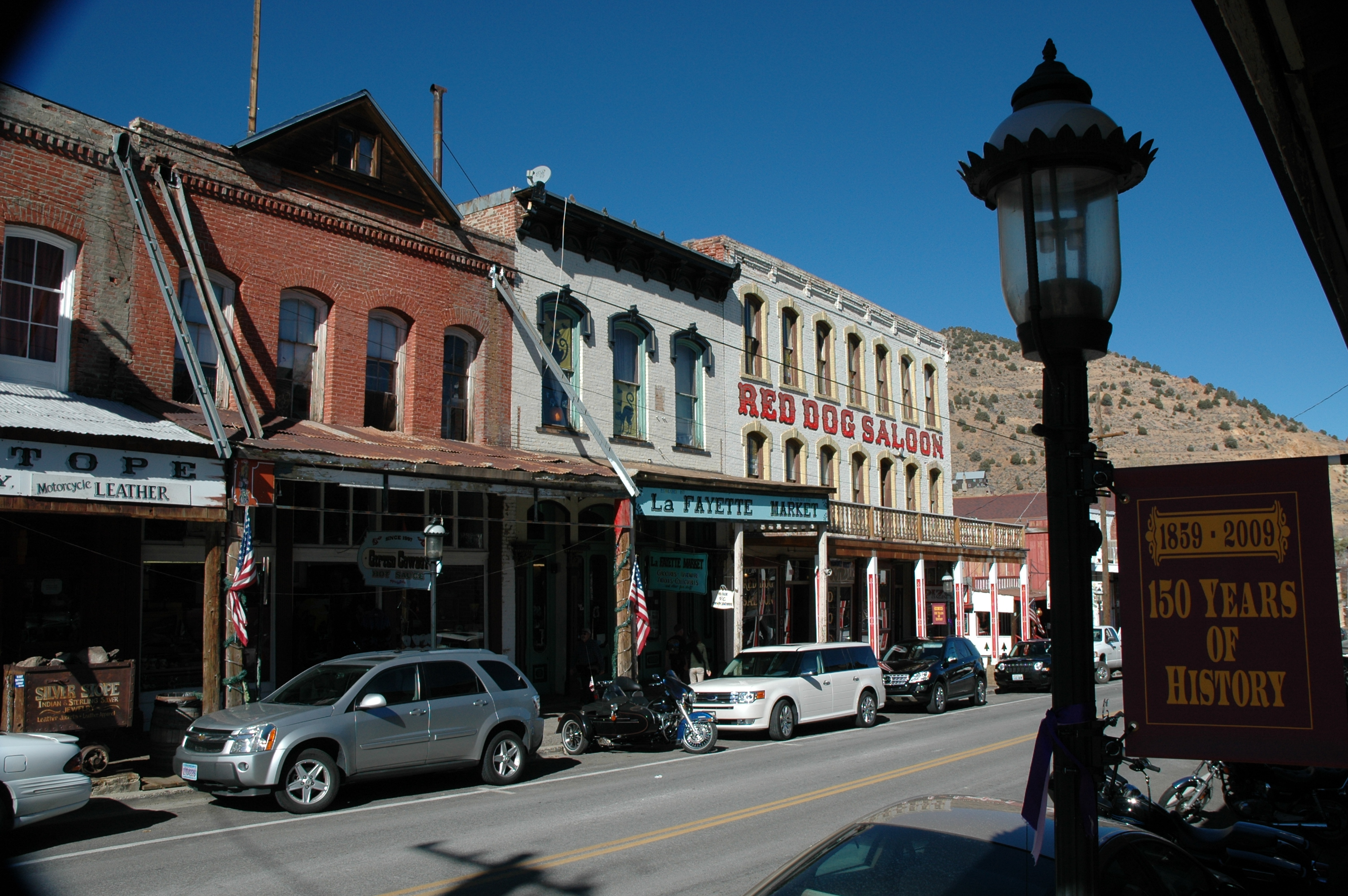
Red Dog Saloon (right) on Main Street in Virginia City

The Red Dog Saloon is a bar and live music venue located in Virginia City, Nevada. The bar played an important role in the history of the psychedelic music scene.

Folk music enthusiast Mark Unobsky bought the Henry Comstock’s house in Virginia City. Then used the building to open a folk club with Chandler A. Laughlin III (1937—2012), a folk club owner, and Don Works in the early 1960s.

In April 1963, Chandler established a family identity among approximately fifty people who attended the traditional, all-night Native American peyote ceremony. This ceremony combined a psychedelic experience with traditional Native American spiritual values; these people went on to sponsor a new genre of musical expression at the venue.

During the summer of 1965, Laughlin recruited much of the original talent of the traditional folk music and psychedelic rock. He and his friends created what became known as "The Red Dog Experience," featuring previously unknown musical acts, such as Big Brother and the Holding Company, The Charlatans, The Wildflower and others — who played in the refurbished saloon during 1965-1966. There was no clear delineation between "performers" and "audience" in the bar. During, which music psychedelic experimentation and Bill Ham's first primitive light shows came.

LSD manufacturer Owsley Stanley lived in Berkeley during 1965 and provided LSD that became a part of the experience. At the saloon, The Charlatans were the first psychedelic rock band to play live whilst on LSD.
