= Vallejo (ferry) =

Houseboat in California, United States

- Vallejo during its time as a ferry between Mare Island and Vallejo

History
- Name: O&CRR Ferry No. 2 (c.1879); Vallejo (c.1895)
- Owner: Oregon & California Railroad
- Launched: 1879

General characteristics
- Length: 123.2 ft (37.6 m)
- Beam: 31.5 ft (9.6 m)
- Draft: 9.9 ft (3.0 m)
- Installed power: 455 hp (339 kW) steam engine

The Vallejo is a houseboat in Sausalito, California, United States. It was originally a passenger ferry in Portland, Oregon, known as O&CRR Ferry No. 2, in the late 19th century. After falling into disuse in Portland, it was transported to the San Francisco Bay in California, where it was used as a ferry between Vallejo and Mare Island until the end of World War II. It was later purchased by a group led by artist Jean Varda, and repurposed as a houseboat, where many parties and salons were hosted. The vessel was sold to the Society for Comparative Philosophy ("SCP"), which was created by Alan Watts and Elsa Gidlow as a charitable and teaching organization in 1962. It hosted many seminars and musical events and attracted many of the leading figures in the San Francisco area counterculture scene of the 1960s, 70s, and '80s. Jean Varda rented from the SCP until he died in the early 1970s. The Society continued under Elsa Gidlow's leadership until she died in 1986.

== History ==
The Oregon & California Railroad Ferry No. 2 initially served Portland, providing connectivity between the East Portland terminus of the O&C Railroad line and Downtown Portland. The 414 ton boat was put into service in 1879 by Henry Villard, to replace an aging ferry initially set up by Ben Holladay. In November 1878, a drunken passenger had stepped off the boat before it landed and drowned; the resulting legal action was ultimately appealed to the Oregon Supreme Court.

Differing accounts have Ferry No. 2 built on the East Coast and coming to Portland around Cape Horn, or else being built in Portland.

With the construction of the Steel Bridge in 1888, the ferry was no longer needed; after several idle years, it was transported to the San Francisco Bay, renamed Vallejo (no later than 1904), and converted to use coal and then oil for fuel. A bill of sale dated 1923 reflects a purchase by Robert Rauhauge of the Mare Island Line. It was put into service transporting workers and visitors between the city of Vallejo and Mare Island. Ferry service was discontinued after the end of World War II, and with the construction of a causeway connecting Mare Island and Vallejo; Vallejo was the last ferry to be retired. She was sold for scrap in 1947 and delivered to Sausalito for breaking up.

=== Restoration ===
Artist Jean Varda noticed the boat while its demolition was pending. He, surrealist Gordon Onslow Ford, and architect Forest Wright purchased it; Wright soon sold his third to Ford. They made extensive, improvised alterations using scraps from the area and turned the boat into an art studio and houseboat. Ford described it as "a place where artists blossomed, flowered", adding that "Varda set the tone" with his interest in entertaining.

Under the auspices of The Society For Comparative Philosophy ( 1962–1984), poet Elsa Gidlow and philosopher Alan Watts bought Ford's share of the houseboat in 1961. The ferry was then used as home base for Alan and Jano Watts and meeting place for hundreds of Society functions. The Society's parties and salons continued until the 1980s when the vessel became too expensive to maintain and was sold.

=== Houseboat Summit ===
A gathering on the Vallejo was known as the "Houseboat Summit" featured Timothy Leary, Allen Ginsberg, Gary Snyder and Watts discussing LSD and life style issues; The famous discussion can be found in the counterculture magazine the San Francisco Oracle.

=== Later life ===
Vallejo deteriorated badly during the 1960s. Varda died suddenly in 1971, as did Watts in 1973. Talks, seminars, and musical events continued on the boat after Watts' death and into the 1980s, as the SCP remained a viable entity that charitably hosted such events as part of their mission statement from the early 1970s. Lama Govinda and Li Gotami held talks there. Also, Elsa Gidlow and Margo St. James held the first meeting of Whores, Housewives and Others (WHO) here at this time. Tai chi master Al Huang held seminars on flute playing, dancing, and meditation before and for several years after Watts died in 1973. In 1978, Alfred Sorensen, a mystic known as Sunyata, held weekly meetings there where he would answer questions from visitors. Mickey Hart of the Grateful Dead gave a concert here.

Marian Saltman, who had begun living on Vallejo in 1971, rented it for years and arranged for its purchase in 1981, when she began to restore the boat. She said, "I hope she will continue to be the home of remarkable people and ideas, and I wish her to serve the creative and artistic needs of Sausalito and the Bay Area." In 1985, the San Francisco Zen Center took possession of the vessel when Saltman no longer wanted to continue her payments to the SCP. The SFZC soon gave up the dilapidated boat, whose upkeep had become unwieldy.

Now in private hands, the Vallejo was transferred across the San Francisco Bay to an Alameda shipyard for repairs in 2000, and then returned to her dock in Sausalito. A new fiberglass outer hull was constructed and installed. The houseboat operates as a private residence with no visitation permitted.
