= San Francisco Oracle =

Underground newspaper

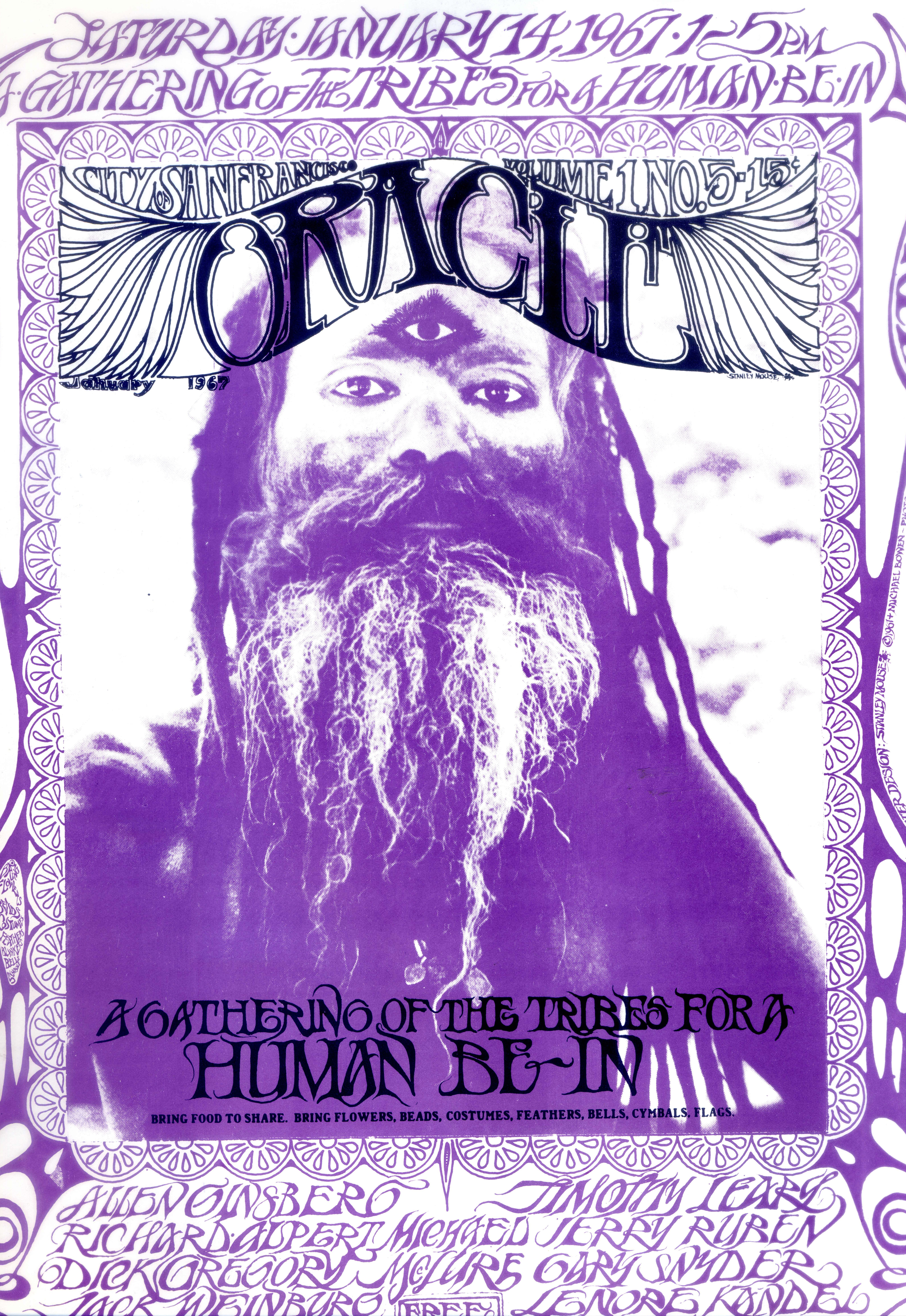
- San Francisco Oracle Cover Vol. 1, No. 5, January 1967
- Type: underground newspaper
- Format: Tabloid/Alternative newspaper
- Founder(s): Allen Cohen, Michael Bowen, et al.
- Editor-in-chief: Allen Cohen
- Art Director: Michael Bowen
- Founded: September 20, 1966; 59 years ago in San Francisco
- Ceased publication: February 1968; 58 years ago
- Headquarters: San Francisco, CA
- Circulation: 125,000

The Oracle of the City of San Francisco, also known as the San Francisco Oracle, was an underground newspaper published in 12 issues from September 20, 1966, to February 1968 in the Haight-Ashbury neighborhood of that city. Allen Cohen (1940–2004), the editor during the paper's most vibrant period, and Michael Bowen, the art director, were among the founders of the publication. The Oracle was an early member of the Underground Press Syndicate.

The Oracle combined poetry, spirituality, and multicultural interests with psychedelic design, reflecting and shaping the countercultural community as it developed in the Haight-Ashbury. Arguably the outstanding example of psychedelia within the countercultural "underground" press, the publication was noted for experimental multicolored design. Oracle contributors included many significant San Francisco–area artists of the time, including Bruce Conner and Rick Griffin. It featured such Beat Generation writers as Allen Ginsberg, Gary Snyder, Lawrence Ferlinghetti and Michael McClure.

== History ==
The initial impetus for the paper came from Allen Cohen and head shop owners Ron and Jay Thelin, who offered to put up the seed money to found an underground paper. In the summer of 1966 a number of meetings were held in the Haight-Ashbury district to discuss the idea of starting a paper, attracting an eclectic group of interested people. The result of these meetings was a paper called P.O. Frisco which lasted for a single 12-page tabloid issue dated September 2, 1966, under the editorship of Dan Elliot and Richard Sassoon (a 31-year-old Yale-educated poet who had once been Sylvia Plath's boyfriend), operating out of a storefront on Frederick Street in cooperation with members of the radical Progressive Labor Party. "P.O." stood for "Psychedelphic Oracle," a title suggested by Bruce Conner. P.O. Frisco was a compromise between the various factions involved in founding the paper which wound up satisfying no one, and the Thelin brothers threatened to terminate their financial support unless the paper was completely reinvented.

A second attempt began out of new offices behind the Print Mint on Haight Street, under new editors George Tsongas and John Bronson. The new paper, The San Francisco Oracle, started with issue number #1. This paper did not yet have the dense verbose and graphically rich psychedelic design the Oracle later became famous for, but it soon acquired those attributes. Bronson and Tsongas edited the first two issues of the new Oracle and then left after a fight with Cohen and Gabe Katz, who became the paper's new art editor starting with issue #3 while Cohen took over as editor, a role he maintained until the end.

One week after the redesigned Oracle #3 appeared on the streets around November 8, 1966, editor Cohen was busted in the Thelins' Psychedelic Shop for selling a police vice squad officer a copy of Lenore Kandel's book of verse, The Love Book. This case became a free speech cause célèbre around the country.

The Oracle quickly developed a stable core group of staffers which included, among many others, Michael Bowen, Stephen Levine, Travis Rivers (a Texan friend of Janis Joplin, he was at that time the manager of the Haight Street branch of the Print Mint), George Tsongas, who had returned to the paper, staff artists Dangerfield Ashton, Ami McGill, and Hetti McGee, poet Harry Monroe, Gene Grimm, and Steve Lieper.

After issue #5, the paper moved into the premises formerly occupied by Michael Bowen at 1371 Haight Street near Masonic. The new offices were open 24 hours a day.

Starting with issue #6 the paper switched printers from Waller Press (which later served as the printers for the San Francisco Express Times) to Howard Quinn Printers. At the Howard Quinn shop the paper's artists were allowed to come in on Sundays when the paper was being printed and experiment with the presses, and it was at this time that the revolutionary split-fountain rainbow inking effect was perfected. This involved placing makeshift wooden dams in the ink fountain and using them to feed different colored inks simultaneously into the fountain, which produced a rainbow effect which was a bit difficult to read but visually arresting.

The more colorful Oracle was an instant success and the paper had to go back to press on successive Sundays to run off more copies. The paper's circulation, which had started with a modest 3,000 copies and gradually grew to about 15,000 copies by issue #4 and 50,000 copies by #5, ran off 60–75,000 copies of #6 and even more of #7. Starting with #6 every issue went back to press for at least a second printing, sometimes with changes in content.

At its peak, the publication's print run was about 125,000, but its editors estimated that ample pass-around readership brought their circulation above half a million.

The influential sprawling thematic pieces that ran in the Oracle include the astrologers' symposium on the Age of Aquarius in issue #6, with Ambrose Hollingworth, Gayla (Rosalind Sharpe Wall, an associate of John Starr Cooke), and Gavin Arthur; and the "Houseboat Summit" in issue #7 which brought together Alan Watts, Allen Ginsberg, Timothy Leary, and Gary Snyder for a long, free-ranging discussion on the houseboat owned by Watts and Elsa Gidlow through their Society for Comparative Philosophy. . It began with Watts posing the question "Whether to drop out or take over?" Elsa Gidlow, a quiet counterculture engine in her own right, contributed an essay to that same issue entitled "Sounds From the Seedpower Sitar". Issue #5, the "Human Be-In" issue, was the launching pad for the Gathering of the Tribes held in Golden Gate Park on January 14, 1967. Issue #12, which was to be the last, featured an uncut transcript of a symposium at Masonic Auditorium entitled "2000 A.D." with Alan Watts, Herman Kahn and Carl Rogers.

== Successors and imitators ==
After the paper folded, Oracle staff who had left the city and relocated in Middletown, California, put out a single one-shot issue of a 24-page psychedelic tabloid paper called the Harbinger in [July] 1968, with contributions by Alan Watts, Timothy Leary, Michael Hollingshead, and others.

In November, a new Oracle called the San Francisco Oracle of the Spiritual Revolution was launched, publishing 7 issues between November 1968 and November 1969. Published in Larkspur, CA and edited by Phillip Davenport (1943–2001), a disciple of Murshid Samuel Lewis (Sufi Sam), it had a more spiritual focus and included material relating to Stephen Gaskin, Sufi Sam, Ram Dass, and other gurus of the San Francisco scene, as well as the usual underground fare.

A monthly psychedelic Los Angeles paper with neopagan overtones, called The Oracle of Southern California, existed for about a year; the first issue was published as The City of Los Angeles Oracle in March 1967.

Some members of the SF Oracle collective were involved in starting another paper, San Francisco Express Times, which published from January 24, 1968, to March 25, 1969, at which time the paper's name was changed to San Francisco Good Times, appearing under that title from April 1969 to August 1972.

In 1967 students at San Francisco State College distributed a one-off eight-page tabloid parody of the Oracle called the Orifice, edited by Ben Fong-Torres.

== See also ==
- Summer of Love
- Big Brother and the Holding Company referenced under Mainstream Records debut
- List of underground newspapers of the 1960s counterculture
