= Allen Cohen (poet) =

American poet

Allen Cohen (1940 – April 29, 2004) was an American poet. Born in 1940 in Brooklyn, New York, he attended Brooklyn College and then moved to San Francisco in 1963. There, he founded and edited the San Francisco Oracle underground newspaper, which was published from 1966 to 1968. After the September 11 attacks, he edited a newspaper entitled Peace News, and in 2002 co-edited a poetry anthology entitled An Eye for an Eye Makes the Whole World Blind: Poets on 9/11. Cohen died of liver cancer and hepatitis C on April 29, 2004, in Walnut Creek, California.
