= List of protests against the Vietnam War =

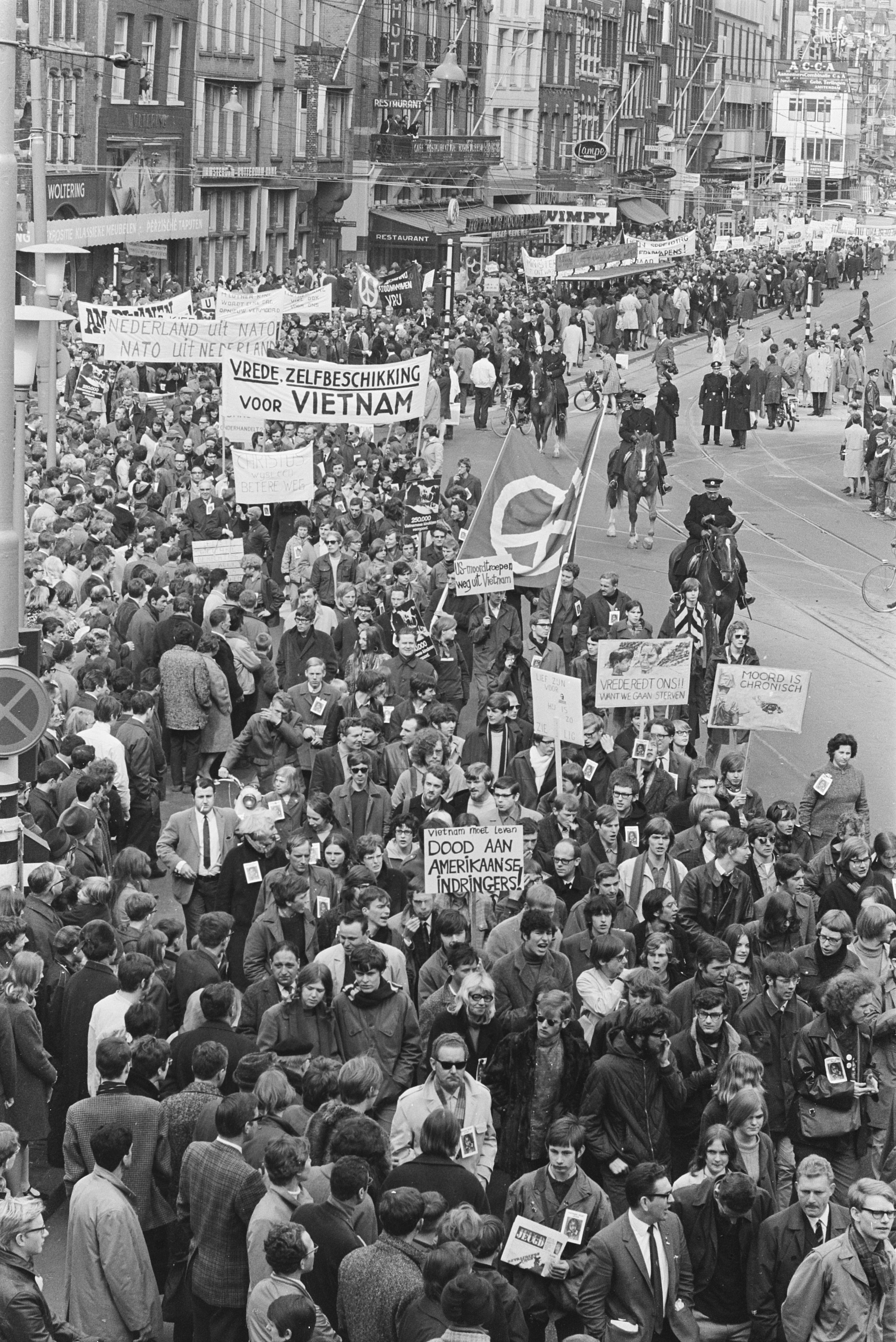
Protest against the Vietnam War in Amsterdam in April 1968

Protests against the Vietnam War took place in the 1960s and 1970s. The protests were part of a movement in opposition to United States involvement in the Vietnam War. The majority of the protests were in the United States, but some took place around the world.

== List of protests ==
=== 1945 ===
- The first protests against U.S. involvement in Vietnam were in 1945, when United States Merchant Marine sailors condemned the U.S. government for the use of U.S. merchant ships to transport European troops to "subjugate the native population" of Vietnam.

=== 1954 ===
- American Quakers began protesting via the media. For example, in May, "just after the defeat of the French at Dien Bien Phu, the Service Committee bought a page in The New York Times to protest what seemed to be the tendency of the USA to step into Indo-China as France stepped out. We expressed our fear that in so doing, America would back into a war."

=== 1960 ===
- November. Amid rising U.S. involvement in Vietnam, 1,100 Quakers undertook a silent protest vigil—the group "ringed the Pentagon for parts of two days".

=== 1963 ===
- May. Anti-Vietnam war protests in England and Australia.
- September 21. War Resisters League organizes first U.S. protest against the Vietnam War and "anti-Buddhist terrorism" by the U.S.-supported South Vietnamese regime with a demonstration at the US Mission to the UN in New York City.
- October 9. WRL among other groups turn out 300 pickets against a speaking engagement by Madame Ngo Dinh Nhu at the Waldorf-Astoria hotel in New York City.

=== 1964 ===
- March. A conference at Yale plans demonstrations on May 4.
- April 25. The Internal Protector published a pledge of draft resistance by some of these organizers.
- May 2. Hundreds of students demonstrate on New York's Times Square and from there went to the United Nations. 700 marched in San Francisco. Smaller demonstrations took place in Boston, Madison, Wisconsin and Seattle. These protests were organized by the Progressive Labor Party, with help from the Young Socialist Alliance. The May 2nd Movement was the PLP's youth affiliate.
- May 12. Twelve young men in New York publicly burn their draft cards to protest the war – the first such act of war resistance.
- Fall. Free Speech Movement at the University of California at Berkeley defends the right of students to carry out political organizing on campus. Founder: Mario Savio.
- Early August. White and black activists gathered near Philadelphia, Mississippi for the memorial service of three civil rights workers. One of the speakers bitterly spoke out against Johnson's use of force in Vietnam, comparing it to violence used against blacks in Mississippi.
- December 19. First coordinated nationwide protests against the Vietnam War included demonstrations in New York City (sponsored by War Resisters League, Fellowship of Reconciliation, Committee for Non-Violent Action, the Socialist Party of America, and the Student Peace Union and attended by 1500 people), San Francisco (1000 people), Minneapolis, Miami, Austin, Sacramento, Philadelphia, Chicago, Washington D.C., Boston, Cleveland, and other cities.

=== 1965 ===
- February 2 –March. Protests at the University of Kansas in Lawrence, Kansas organized by the RA Student Peace Union.
- February 12–16. Anti-U.S. demonstrations in various cities in the world, "including a break-in at the U.S. embassy in Budapest, Hungary, by some 200 Asian and African students."
- March 15. A debate organized by the Inter-University Committee for a Public Hearing on Vietnam is held in Washington, D.C. Radio and television coverage.
- March 16. An 82-year-old Detroit woman named Alice Herz self-immolated to make a statement against the horrors of the war. She died ten days later.
- March 24. First SDS organized teach-in, at the University of Michigan at Ann Arbor. 3,000 students attend and the idea spreads fast.
- March. Berkeley, California: Jerry Rubin and Stephen Smale's Vietnam Day Committee (VDC) organize a huge protest of 35,000.
- April. Oklahoma college students sent out hundreds of thousands of pamphlets with pictures of dead babies in a combat zone on them to portray a message about battles taking place in Vietnam.
- April 17. The SDS-organized March Against the Vietnam War onto Washington, D.C. was the largest anti-war demonstration in the U.S. to date with 15,000 to 20,000 people attending. Paul Potter demands a radical change of society.
- May 5. Several hundred people carrying a black coffin marched to the Berkeley, California draft board, and 40 men burned their draft cards.
- May 21–23. Vietnam Day Committee organized large teach-in at UC Berkeley. 10–30,000 attend.
- May 22. The Berkeley draft board was visited again, with 19 men burning their cards. President Lyndon B. Johnson was hung in effigy.
- Summer. Young Black-Americans in McComb, Mississippi learn one of their classmates was killed in Vietnam and distribute a leaflet saying "No Mississippi Negroes should be fighting in Vietnam for the White man's freedom".
- June. Richard Steinke, a West Point graduate in Vietnam, refused to board an aircraft taking him to a remote Vietnamese village, stating the war "is not worth a single American life".
- June 27. End Your Silence, an open letter in the New York Times by the group Artists and Writers Protest against the War in Vietnam.
- July. The Vietnam Day Committee organized militant protest in Oakland, California ends in inglorious debacle, when the organizers end the march from Oakland to Berkeley to avoid a confrontation with police.
- July. A Women Strike for Peace- delegation led by Cora Weiss meets its North Vietnamese and Vietcong counterpart in Jakarta, Indonesia.
- July 30. A man from the Catholic Worker Movement is photographed burning his draft card on Whitehall Street in Manhattan in front of the Armed Forces Induction Center. His photograph appears in Life magazine in August.
- October 15. David J. Miller burned his draft card at a rally again held near the Armed Forces Induction Center on Whitehall Street. The 24-year-old pacifist, member of the Catholic Worker Movement, became the first man arrested and convicted under the 1965 amendment to the Selective Service Act of 1948.
- Europe, October 15–16. First "International Days of Protest". Anti-U.S. demonstrations in London, Rome, Brussels, Copenhagen and Stockholm.
- October 16. Tens of thousands march down New York's Fifth Avenue to protest the war, in a parade organized by the NY Fifth Avenue Peace Parade Committee.
- October 20. Stephen Lynn Smith, a student at the University of Iowa, spoke to a rally at the Memorial Union in Iowa City, Iowa, and burned his draft card. He was arrested, found guilty and put on three years probation.
- October 30. Pro-Vietnam War march in New York City brings 25,000.
- November 2. In front of the Pentagon in Washington, as thousands of employees were streaming out of the building in the late afternoon, Norman Morrison, a thirty-two-year-old pacifist, father of three, stood below the third-floor windows of Secretary of Defense Robert McNamara, doused himself with kerosene, and set himself afire, giving up his life in protest against the war.
- November 6. Thomas C. Cornell, Marc Paul Edelman, Roy Lisker, David McReynolds and James Wilson burned their draft cards at a public rally organized by the Committee for Non-Violent Action in Union Square, New York City.
- November 27. SANE-sponsored March on Washington in 1965. 15,000 to 20,000 demonstrators.
- December 16–17. High school students in Des Moines, Iowa, are suspended for wearing black armbands to "mourn the deaths on both sides" and in support of Robert F. Kennedy's call for a Christmas truce. The students sued the Des Moines School District, resulting in the 1969 U.S. Supreme Court decision in favor of the students, Tinker v. Des Moines.

=== 1966 ===
- From September 1965 to January 1970, 170,000 men had been drafted and another 180,000 enlisted. By January, 2,000,000 men had secured college deferments.
- February. Local artists in Hollywood build a 60-foot tower of protest on Sunset Boulevard.
- March 25–26. Second "Days of International Protest". Organized by the National Coordinating Committee to End the War in Vietnam, led by SANE, Women Strike for Peace, the Committee for Nonviolent Action and the SDS: 20,000 to 25,000 in New York City alone, along with demonstrations in Boston, Philadelphia, Washington, D.C., Chicago, Detroit, San Francisco, Oklahoma City, Oklahoma, and abroad, in Ottawa, London, Oslo, Stockholm, Lyon, and Tokyo.
- March 31. David Paul O'Brien and three companions burned their draft cards on the steps of the South Boston Courthouse. The case was tried by the Supreme Court in United States v. O'Brien.
- Spring. Clergy and Laymen Concerned About Vietnam founded.
- May 15. March Against the Vietnam War, led by SANE and Women Strike for Peace, with 8,000 to 10,000 taking part.
- Muhammad Ali (Cassius Clay) refused to go to war, famously stating that he had "no quarrel with the Viet Cong" and that "no Viet Cong ever called me nigger." Ali also said he would not go "10,000 miles to help murder, kill, and burn other people to simply help continue the domination of white slavemasters over dark people." In 1967 he was sentenced to 5 years in prison, but was released on appeal by the United States Supreme Court.
- Summer. Six members of the SNCC invade an induction center in Atlanta and are later arrested.
- July 3. A crowd of over 4,000 demonstrate outside of the U.S. Embassy in London. Scuffles break out between the protesters and police, and at least 31 people are arrested.
- September 10–11. First national antiwar Mobilization Committee established as the November 8 Mobilization Committee.
- November 7. Protests against U.S. Secretary of Defense Robert McNamara at Harvard University.
- November 26. The November 8 Mobilization Committee becomes the Spring Mobilization Committee to End the War in Vietnam, formalized at the Cleveland Conference under the leadership of national director Reverend James Bevel.
- Late December. Student Mobilization Committee formed.

=== 1967 ===
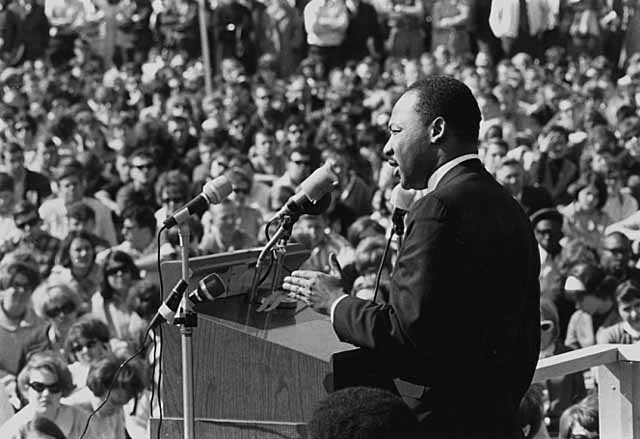
Martin Luther King Jr. speaking to an anti-Vietnam war rally at the University of Minnesota in Saint Paul, Minnesota, on April 27, 1967

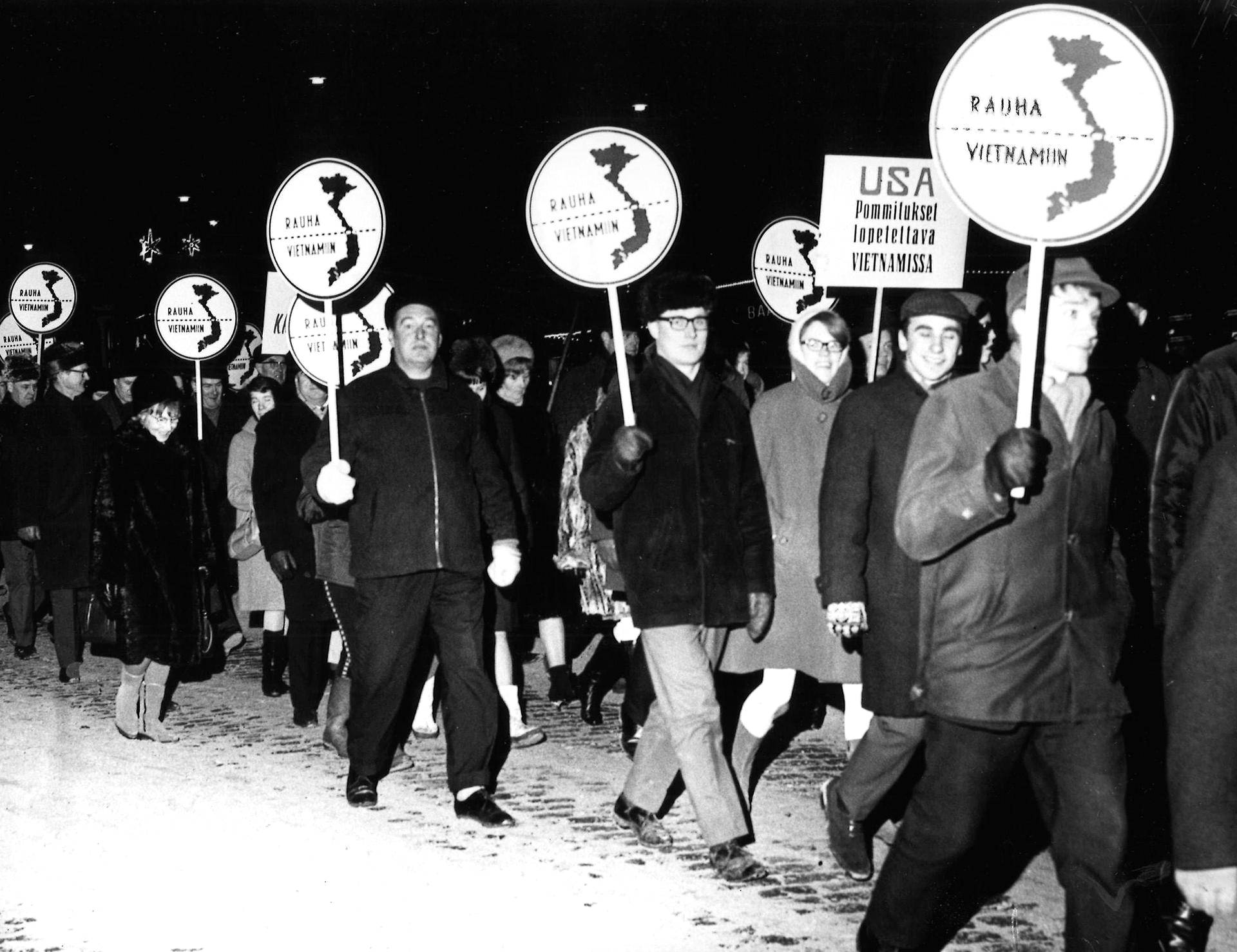
A protest against the Vietnam War in Helsinki in December 1967

- January 29 – February 5. Angry Arts Week by the Artists Protest group.
- April 4. Martin Luther King Jr. speaks at Riverside church in New York City about the Vietnam War: "Beyond Vietnam: A Time to Break Silence". King stated that, "somehow this madness must cease. We must stop now. I speak as a child of God and brother to the suffering poor of Vietnam. I speak for those whose land is being laid waste, whose homes are being destroyed, whose culture is being subverted. I speak for the poor of America who are paying the double price of smashed hopes at home and death and corruption in Vietnam. I speak as a citizen of the world, for the world as it stands aghast at the path we have taken. I speak as an American to the leaders of my own nation. The great initiative in this war is ours. The initiative to stop it must be ours."
- April 15. At Sheep Meadow in Central Park in New York City, some 60 young men including a few Cornell University students came together to burn their draft cards in a Maxwell House coffee can. More join them, including uniformed Green Beret Army Reservist Gary Rader. As many as 158 cards are burned.
- April 15. The National Mobilization Committee to End the War in Vietnam stages an anti-war demonstration in New York City marching from Central Park to the United Nations, with over 400,000 attendees. Speakers included Martin Luther King Jr., Harry Belafonte, James Bevel, and Dr. Benjamin Spock. A group of veterans including Jan Barry meet under an impromptu banner reading "Vietnam Veterans Against the War"; this would inspire the VVAW organization, founded on June 1. A simultaneous march occurs in San Francisco.
- May 20–21. 700 activists at the Spring Mobilization Conference in Washington, D.C. The Spring Mobilization Committee to End the War in Vietnam becomes the National Mobilization Committee to End the War in Vietnam (the Mobe).
- Stockholm (May) and Roskilde, Denmark (November). International War Crimes Tribunal, known as the Russell Tribunal, unanimously finds the U.S. government and its armed forces "guilty of the deliberate, systematic and large-scale bombardment of civilian targets, including civilian populations, dwellings, villages, dams, dikes, medical establishments, leper colonies, schools, churches, pagodas, historical and cultural monuments".
- June 1. The Vietnam Veterans Against the War is formed. Veteran Jan Barry Crumb participated in a protest on April 15 called the "Fifth Avenue Peace Parade" in New York City. On May 30, Crumb and ten like-minded men attended a peace demonstration in Washington, D.C.
- June 23. The Bond, the first G.I. underground paper established.
- June 23. 1,300 police attack 10,000 peace marchers at The Century Plaza Hotel in Los Angeles, where President Lyndon B. Johnson was being honored.
- In the summer of 1967, Neil Armstrong and various other NASA officials began a tour of South America to raise awareness for space travel. According to First Man, a biography of Armstrong's life, during the tour several South American college students protested the astronaut, and shouted such phrases as "Murderers get out of Vietnam!" and other anti-Vietnam War messages.
- October 16. A day of widespread war protest organized by The Mobe in 30 cities across the U.S., with some 1,400 draft cards burned.
- October 18. "Dow Day" at the University of Wisconsin–Madison in Madison, Wisconsin, the first university Vietnam War protest to turn violent as thousands of students protest Dow Chemical, the manufacturer of napalm, during the company's campus recruitment visit. Nineteen police officers and about 50 students were treated for injuries at hospitals.
- October 20. Resist leaders present draft cards to the United States Department of Justice in Washington, D.C.
- October 21–23. National Mobe organized the March on the Pentagon to "Confront the War Makers". 100,000 are at the Lincoln Memorial on the National Mall in Washington D.C., 35,000 to 50,000 go on to The Pentagon, some to engage in acts of civil disobedience. Norman Mailer's later authors The Armies of the Night, which describes the march and protest.
- October 27. Father Philip Berrigan, a Josephite priest and World War II veteran, led a group now known as the Baltimore Four who went to a draft board in Baltimore, drenched the draft records with blood, and waited to be arrested.
- December 4. National draft card turn-in. At the Phillip Burton Federal Building in San Francisco, some 500 protesters witness 88 draft cards collected and burned.
- December 4–8. During "Stop the Draft Week" demonstrations in New York City, 585 are arrested, including Benjamin Spock.
- Sweden, December 20. Seventh Year of the Viet Cong, the Front National de Libération du Vietnam du Sud, or FNL, is celebrated with violent clashes in Stockholm and 40 Swedish towns.

=== 1968 ===
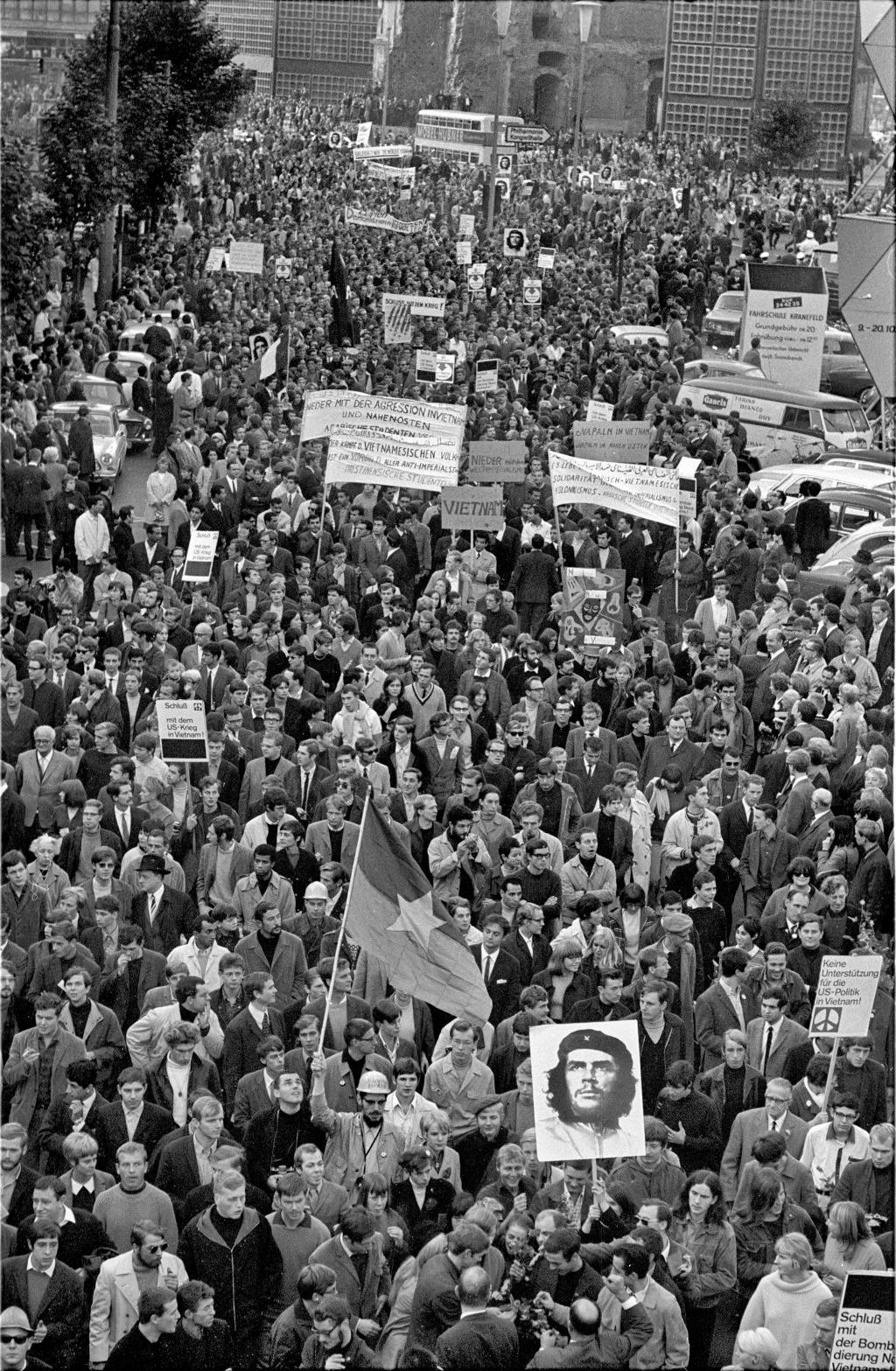
West German students protest against the Vietnam War in 1968

- United States Peace Corps volunteers in Chile spoke out against the war. 92 volunteers defied the Peace Corps director and issued a circular denouncing the war.
- January. Singer Eartha Kitt, while at a luncheon at the White House, speaks out against the war and its effects on the youth, exclaiming, "you send the best of this country off to be shot and maimed," to her fellow guests. "They rebel in the street. They will take pot...and they will get high. They don't want to go to school because they're going to be snatched off from their mothers to be shot in Vietnam."
- January 15. Jeannette Rankin leads a demonstration of thousands of women in Washington, D.C.
- March 17. In London, a violent protest not supported by the Old Left leads to over 300 arrests.
- April 2. In Frankfurt, Gudrun Ensslin and Andreas Baader are joined by Thorwald Proll and Horst Söhnlein, and set fire to two department stores.
- April 3. At a national draft-card turn-in, about 1,000 draft cards were turned in. In Boston, 15,000 protesters watched 235 men turn in their draft cards.
- April 4. The Assassination of Martin Luther King Jr. silences one of the leading voices against the war.
- April 27. In Rome, roughly 300 participants involved in a violent clash with police.
- April 27. At an anti-war rally of 15,000 people at Civic Center Plaza in San Francisco, protesters are joined by the Black Panther Party, Muhammad Ali, Bobby Seale, Black Muslims, the Socialist Workers Party, and the Iranian Students Association.
- April 27. An anti-war protest in Grant Park and the Civic Center Plaza in Chicago is attended by an estimated 12,000 people.
- April 27. The annual "Loyalty Day March" in New York City includes 20,000 anti-war protestors.
- Late April. Student Mobe sponsored national student strike, demonstrations in New York City and San Francisco.
- April–May. Protesters occupy five buildings at Columbia University in Manhattan, and future leading Weather Underground member Mark Rudd gains prominence.
- April 11. In Berlin, Rudi Dutschke is shot and wounded as massive riots are waged against Axel Springer publishers.
- May. The FBI's COINTELPRO campaign is launched against the New Left.
- May. The agricultural building at Southern Illinois University in Carbondale, Illinois is bombed.
- May 1. Boston University graduate Philip Supina wrote to his draft board in Tucson, Arizona, that he had "absolutely no intention to report for [his] exam, or for induction, or to aid in any way the American war effort against the people of Vietnam."
- May 17. Philip Berrigan and his brother, Daniel, lead seven others into a draft board office in Catonsville, Maryland, remove records, and set them afire with homemade napalm outside in front of reporters and onlookers.
- June 4–5. The hope of the antiwar movement, presidential candidate Robert F. Kennedy, is shot after celebrating victory in the California primary during the 1968 Democratic Party presidential primaries; Kennedy dies the next morning, June 6.
- Late June. Student Mobe ruptures.
- August 28. Democratic National Convention in Chicago protests, "The whole world is watching" with violence against police.
- October. With involvement from the Vietnam Solidarity Campaign, 100,000 people (estimated) marched on Trafalgar Square, one of the largest post-war demonstrations in Britain.
- October 14, 1968. Presidio mutiny, a sit-down protest carried out by 27 military prisoners at the U.S. Army's Presidio stockade in San Francisco
- October 21. In Japan, 20,000 activists occupied the Shinjuku Station, protesting an earlier incident in August 1967 where a JNR freight train hauling kerosene to the Tachikawa Airbase collided with another train and exploded. The activists managed to disrupt all railway traffic at the station and led to clashes with riot police and acts of vandalism in what became known as the Shinjuku riot; it was the largest anti-war protest in Japan at the time.
- November 14. National draft-card turn-in.

=== 1969 ===
- Throughout the entire year, campus protests take place across the country.
- January 19–20. Protests against Richard Nixon's inauguration.
- March 22. Nine protesters smashed glass, hurled files out a fourth floor window, and poured blood on files and furniture at the Dow Chemical offices in Washington, D.C.
- March 29. Conspiracy charges are filed against eight suspected organizers of the Chicago Convention protests.
- April 5–6. Anti-war demonstrations and parades in several cities, including New York City, San Francisco, Los Angeles, Washington, D.C., and others.
- May 21. The Silver Spring Three, Les Bayless, John Bayless, and Michael Bransome, walked into a Silver Spring, Maryland Selective Service office, where they destroyed several hundred draft records to protest the war.
- June. At Brown University's commencement in Providence, Rhode Island, two-thirds of the graduating class turn their backs when Henry Kissinger stands up to address them.
- June 8. The Old Main building at Southern Illinois University burns to the ground as units of firefighters from the area try to salvage the building but could not put out the fire before everything was destroyed.
- June. In Chicago at the SDS national convention, SDS disintegrates into SDS-WSA and SDS. The Worker Student Alliance of the Progressive Labor Party (PLP) has the majority of delegates (900) on its side. The smaller Revolutionary Youth Movement fraction (500) divide into RYM-I/Weatherman, who retain control of the SDS National Office, and Maoist RYM-II. This fraction will further divide into the various groups of New Communist Movement.
- July 4–5. In Cleveland, national antiwar conference established National Mobilization Committee to End the War in Vietnam.
- October 8–11. The Weatherman's disastrous "Days of Rage" in Chicago as only 300 militants show up, not the expected 10,000. 287 are arrested.
- October 15. National Moratorium against the War demonstrations. Huge crowds in Washington, D.C. and Boston (100,000). Anti-war Senator George McGovern gives a speech to the large crowd in Boston.
- November 15. The Mobe's Moratorium to End the War in Vietnam mobilizes 500,000 in Washington, D.C. Preceded by "March against Death" on November 13 and 14.
- November 26. Selective Service System (draft-lottery) bill is signed.
- December 1. The Selective Service System of the United States conducted two lotteries
- December 7. The 5th Dimension performs their song "Declaration" on the Ed Sullivan Show, including the opening of the Declaration of Independence. "For their future security", it suggests that the right and duty of revolting against a despotic government is still relevant.

=== 1970 ===
- January 30. The Danish artist Bjørn Nørgaard protested against the war by publicly slaughtering a horse. The slaughter was supposed to take place at an art museum, but was instead held on a field as the museum cancelled the arrangement.
- February, March. Wave of bombings across the U.S.
- March. Anti-draft protests across the U.S.
- March 14. SS Columbia Eagle incident: Two American merchant marine sailors, Clyde McKay and Alvin Glatkowski, seized the SS Columbia Eagle and force the master to sail in to Cambodia as opposed to Thailand, where it was on its way to deliver napalm bombs to be used by the US Air Force in Vietnam.
- March 30: About 100 people protest in Albany, New York against the draft.
- April. New Mobe, Moratorium, and SMC protests across the country.
- April 15, 1970: Nationwide marches and rallies across the country.
- April 19: Moratorium announces disbanding.
- May 2: violent anti-war rallies at many universities.
- May 4: At Kent State University in Ohio, a protest is met with the Kent State Shootings, as the U.S. National Guard kill four and wound nine unarmed young people during a demonstration. As a result, four million students go on strike at more than 450 universities and colleges. The best known cultural response to the deaths at Kent State was the protest song "Ohio", written by Neil Young for Crosby, Stills, Nash & Young.
- May 8, in New York City, the Hard Hat Riot occurs after a student anti-war demonstration in which workers attack them and riot for two hours.
- May 8. Jim Cairns, a member of the Australian parliament, leads over 100,000 people in a demonstration in Melbourne. Smaller protests were also held on the same day in every state capital of Australia.
- May 9. Mobe sponsored "Kent State/Cambodia Incursion Protest, Washington, D.C." between 75,000 and 100,000 demonstrators converged on Washington, D.C. to protest the Kent State shootings and the Nixon administration's incursion into Cambodia. Even though the demonstration was quickly put together, protesters were still able to bring out thousands to march in the National Mall in front of the Capitol. It was an almost spontaneous response to the events of the previous week. Police ringed the White House with buses to block the demonstrators from getting too close to the executive mansion. Early in the morning before sunrise, U.S. President Richard Nixon walks to the Lincoln Memorial to meet with the protesters.
- May 14. At Jackson State College in Jackson, Mississippi, the Jackson State killings leave two dead and twelve injured during violent protests.
- May 20. In New York City, an estimated 60,000 to 150,000 attend a pro-war demonstration on Wall Street.
- May 28. At the University of Tennessee in Knoxville, Tennessee, U.S. President Richard Nixon appears at the Billy Graham Crusade in Neyland Stadium. 800 students carry "Thou Shalt Not Kill" signs into the stadium. Many are arrested and charged with "disrupting a religious service" with only Republican candidates on the stage with Graham and Nixon.
- June. Before a commencement at the University of Massachusetts in Amherst, Massachusetts, students stenciled red fists of protests, white peace symbols, and blue doves onto their black gowns.
- August 24. At the University of Wisconsin–Madison in Madison, Wisconsin, the Sterling Hall bombing aimed at the Army Math Research Center on the 2nd, 3rd, and 4th floors of the building misses its target, and a Ford van packed with explosives hits the physics laboratory on the first floor and kills a young researcher Robert Fassnacht and seriously injured others.
- August 29. At Chicano Moratorium. 20,000 to 30,000 Mexican-Americans participate in the largest anti-war demonstration in Los Angeles. Police are attacked with clubs and guns and kill three people, including Rubén Salazar, a TV news director, and a reporter for The Los Angeles Times.
- Due to the activities of the Australian anti-conscription movement, 11,000 men fail to register for national service by the end of 1970.

=== 1971 ===
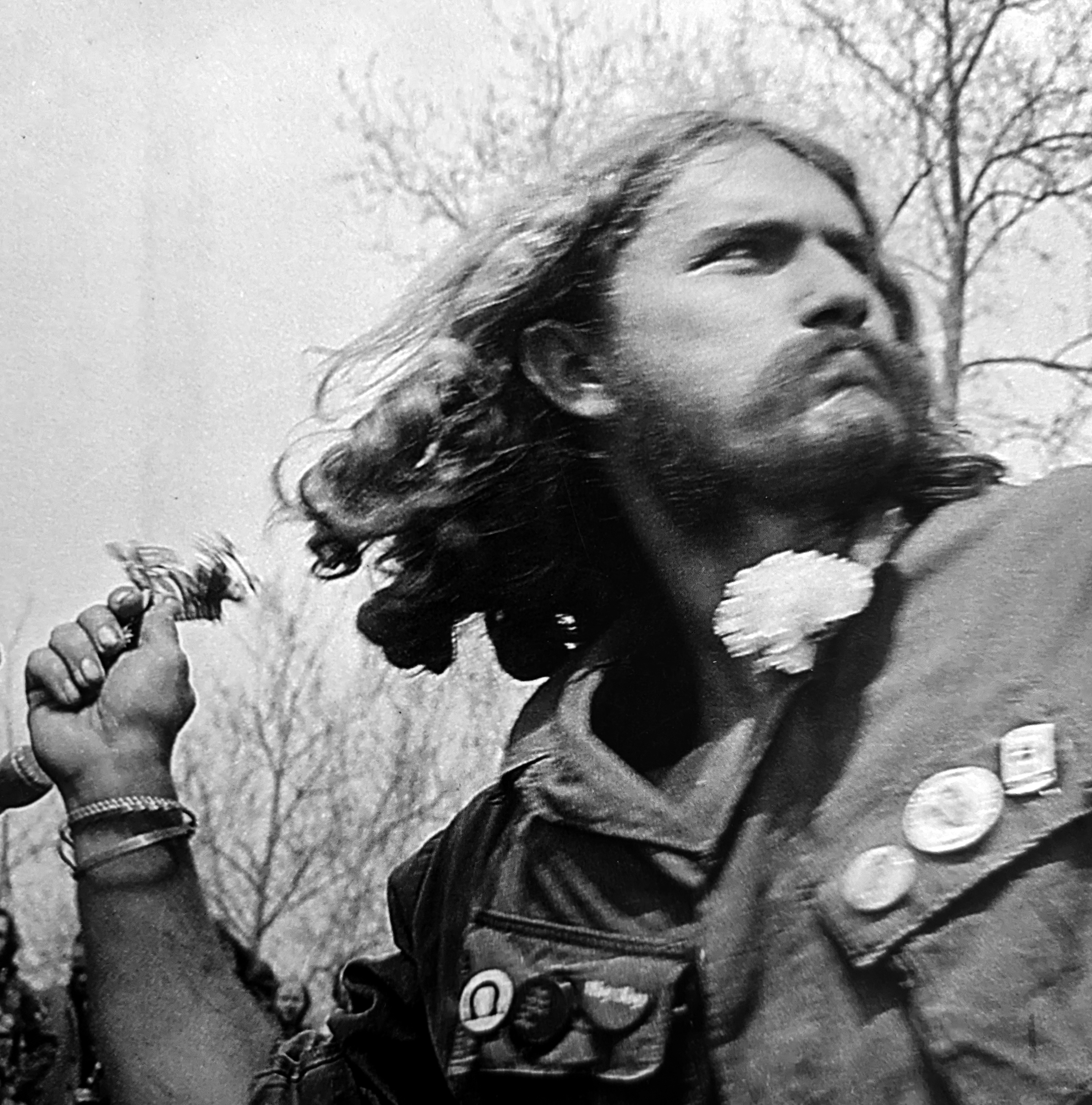
Vietnam Veteran Throwing Medal at the U.S. Capital

- March 1. Weathermen plants a bomb in the Capitol building in Washington, D.C., causing $300,000 in damage, but no casualties.
- April. The Vancouver Indo-Chinese Women's Conference (VICWC), a six-day protest, gathers close to a thousand women in Vancouver, British Columbia.
- April 19–23. Vietnam Veterans against the War (VVAW) stages operation "Dewey Canyon III" with over a thousand camping on the National Mall in Washington, D.C. and hundreds throwing their medals away at the U.S. Capitol (see article).
- April 22–28. Veterans Against the War and John Kerry testify before various U.S. congressional panels.
- April 24. A peaceful "Vietnam War Out Now" rally on the National Mall in Washington, D.C., in which "upwards of half a million took part," calling for an end to the Vietnam War. 156,000 participate in the largest demonstration so far on the West Coast, in San Francisco.
- April 26. More militant attempts in Washington, D.C. to shutdown the U.S. federal government are futile against 5,000 police and 12,000 troops.
- May 3–5, The May Day Protests, planned by Rennie Davis and Jerry Coffin of the War Resisters League, are joined by Michael Lerner; militant mass-action tries to shut down the government in Washington, D.C., and 12,614 are arrested, the most people ever arrested at a single event in American history.
- August. A group of nuns, priests, and laypeople raid a draft board in Camden, New Jersey; they come to be known as the Camden 28.
- December. VVAW protests across the US.

=== 1972 ===
- April 15–20. May. New waves of protests across the country.
- April 17. Militant anti-ROTC demonstration at the University of Maryland in College Park, Maryland, as 800 National Guardsmen are ordered onto the campus.
- April 22. Mass anti-war demonstrations sponsored by National Peace Action Coalition, People's Coalition for Peace and Justice, and other organizations attracted an estimated 100,000 people in New York City, 12,000 in Los Angeles, 25,000 in San Francisco, and other cities around the U.S. and world.
- Frankfurt am Main, Germany, May 11. Headquarters of the V Corps of the U.S. Army at the IG Farben Building: The Commando Petra Schelm of the Rote Armee Fraktion killed U.S. Officer Paul Bloomquist and wounded thirteen in a bombing attack.
- May 21. "Emergency March" in Washington, D.C., organized by the National Peace Action Coalition and the People's Coalition for Peace and Justice. 8,000 to 15,000 protest in Washington, D.C. against the increased bombing of North Vietnam and the mining of its harbors.
- May 24. In Heidelberg, Germany, the Red Army Faction detonates two car bombs at the European Headquarters of the U.S. Army, killing three.
- June 22. "Ring around Congress" demonstration in Washington, D.C.
- In July. Jane Fonda visits North Vietnam and speaks on Hanoi Radio, earning herself the nickname "Hanoi Jane".
- August 22. 3,000 protest against the 1972 Republican National Convention in Miami Beach, Florida, including Ron Kovic, a wheelchair-using Vietnam veteran, who leads fellow veterans into the Convention Hall, wheels down the aisles, and, as Richard Nixon begins his acceptance speech, shouts, "Stop the bombing! Stop the war!"
- October 14. The "Peace March to End the Vietnam War" in San Francisco. This "silent-march" demonstration began at City Hall and moved down Fulton Street to Golden Gate Park, where speeches were given. Over 2,000 were in attendance. Numerous groups, including many veterans, march to support the so-called "7-Point" plan to peace. George McGovern gives a speech at the Cow Palace the night before, which energizes the Saturday morning event.
- November 7. On general election day, U.S. President Richard Nixon defeats George McGovern in a landslide victory with 60.7% popular votes and 520 electoral votes.
- December. Protests against U.S. bombings on Hanoi and Haiphong.

=== 1973 ===
- January 20. Second inauguration of Richard Nixon. Inauguration protests, "March against Racism & the War" in Washington, D.C.

== Common slogans and chants ==
There are many pro- and anti-war slogans and chants. Those who used the anti-war slogans were commonly called "doves"; those who supported the war were known as "hawks"

=== Anti-war ===
- "Hey, hey, LBJ, how many kids did you kill today?" was chanted during Lyndon B. Johnson's tenure as president and almost anytime he appeared publicly.

=== Pro-war ===
- "Love our country", "America, love it or leave it", and "No glory like old glory" are examples of pro-war slogans.

== See also ==
- Anti-nuclear protests in the United States
- List of songs about the Vietnam War
- Opposition to United States involvement in the Vietnam War
- Gaza war protests
- Timeline of 1960s counterculture
