= Bill Epton =

American political activist (1932–2002)

- Epton in 1965
- Born: William Leo Epton Jr. January 17, 1932; Harlem, New York City, US
- Died: January 23, 2002 (aged 70); Manhattan, New York City, US
- Occupation: Political activist
- Political party: Progressive Labor Movement (1962–early 1970s)
- Other political affiliations: Communist Party USA (1958–1961)

William Leo Epton Jr. (January 17, 1932 – January 23, 2002) was an American political activist. A Maoist, he was a founding member of the Progressive Labor Party (PLP), serving as vice-chairman of the Harlem branch. In 1964, he was arrested and convicted of criminal anarchy. He eventually left the PLP in the early 1970s.

== Early life and education ==
Epton was born on January 17, 1923, in Harlem, one of seven children born to a dockworker. He attended public schools, graduating from DeWitt Clinton High School in 1950. While in high school, he began reading Marxist literature he received from the Young Communist League USA. He was a member of the Civil Rights Congress. He later lived in California for some time in search of work.

== Career and activism ==
During the Korean War, Epton was drafted and served in the United States Army, serving in Korea for 13 or 14 months as an artillery electrician and in the military for 23 months total, being honorably discharged. He worked as an electrician until 1965 at the latest.

From 1958 to 1961, Epton was a member of the Communist Party USA (CPUSA). He joined "because of conditions of housing, employment; because I believed the party had a program to improve those things". He was expelled from the CPUSA, alongside others, such as PLP chairman Milt Rosen for "adventurism and cowardice" when they refused to fight against the McCarran Internal Security Act due to fear of imprisonment, with Epton stating he believed the party failed to "follow a Marxist position". He was a founding member of the Progressive Labor Movement (later the Progressive Labor Party; PLP). He was vice-chairman of the Harlem branch of the party. His assistant for a time was Phillip Abbott Luce, who turned out to be an informant.

Epton was part of the New Left. Ideologically, he was a Maoist. On trial, he declared himself a communist, although claimed to not support revolutionary socialism. He believed the Democratic and Republican Parties to be "of big business". In speeches, he stated that American black people needed to use violence in order to free themselves.

=== 1964 arrest and trial ===
On July 16, 1964, New York City Police Department officer Thomas Gilligan shot and killed James Powell, a 15-year-old black man, after which he was exonerated. Epton and his supporters wre among the first to protest the killing, with them installing posters with Gilligan's face and the tagline "wanted for murder".

These protests turned into the Harlem riot of 1964. As a result of the riots, the police banned public gatherings. In defiance of the ban, Epton performed a speech on the corner of 125th Street and Lenox Avenue, on July 25, with him saying "we're going to have to kill a lot of cops, a lot of judges, and we'll have to go against their army". He also said the phrase "burn, baby, burn", which may have influenced the song "Disco Inferno" by The Trammps, with disc jockey Magnificent Montague also being a possible source of its inspiration. For defying the ban, Epton was arrested on August 5.

Epton was named alongside six coconspirators. His trial was postponed until after August 1965. In his trials, he was represented by Sanford Katz and Eleanor Jackson Piel. The plaintiffs argued that his actions kept the riots going, which Piel argued against. They presented a recording of Epton captured by an undercover police officer. Dubious evidence was also presented, which showed that he commanded "riot gangs" to execute firebombings. Between trials, he was released on bail. At different times, his bond sat at $10,000, $25,000, and $35,000; he was bailed by Albert Maher for $10,000, and on May 11, 1966, for $25,000. During his last trial, 60 of his supporters surrounded the courthouse and demanded he be freed.

On December 20, 1965, Epton was convicted on three counts of criminal anarchy, becoming the first person to be convicted of such since Benjamin Gitlow, in 1919. Specifically, he was found guilty of conspiring to overthrow the Government of New York in a black revolution. He was to be sentenced on January 27, 1966, with punishments possibly reaching 12 years in prison and a $6,000 fine. His case was appealed. The New York Court of Appeals agreed with his previous verdict in 1967. In 1968, the Supreme Court of the United States refused to hear Epton's case, per curiam decision, with it being declared a state matter.

Epton was imprisoned for one year on Rikers Island, serving all his counts concurrently. In his sentencing, on January 27, 1966, judge Arthur Markewich described him as believing himself to be "a hero, a leader, a Lenin, a Trotsky, a Castro", though said he led no "great cause". He gave Epton his prison sentence so he could "enjoy punishment", for he would turn himself into a martyr. He served part of his sentence in 1966, serving the rest of it from February 5, 1968, to until later that year.

In 1970, the United States Supreme Court declared speech similar to his to be constitutional. Legal scholar Leon Friedman said he was convicted primarily "due to his words". William O. Douglas also believed he was convicted on his words, arguing that he was unconstitutionally convicted of conspiracy, despite not having acted upon his word. Epton later called his comments about killing judges "a big mistake".

=== Later activism and career ===
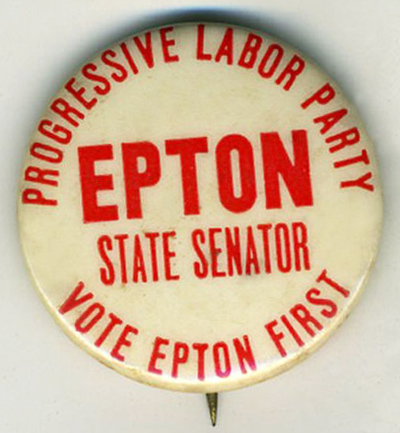
Pin from Epton's 1965 New York State Senate campaign

Epton supported the release of the Harlem Six. In 1963, he tried to run for At-Large district of the New York City Council, but did not receive enough signatures to run. In 1965, he ran for the New York State Senate. He planned for run for City Council again in 1965, in support of Jesse Gray. In all elections, he was the PLP candidate. After being released from prison, he worked as an information officer and printer for the New York City Department of Education.

Epton was a founder of the A. Philip Randolph Labor Council, created to stop racial discrimination in labor unions. During his trials, the PLP realigned its platform and opposed revolutionary nationalism, with the party publishing criticisms of the Communist Party of Vietnam and the Viet Cong amid the Vietnam War. By the early 1970s, Epton left the PLP due to its realignment. After leaving the party, he pushed to unify Marxists across the United States.

== Personal life and death ==
Epton was married to Beryl Epton, with whom he had two children. Physically, he was described as "tall, thin, and moustached". His mother disproved of him. He died on January 23, 2002, aged 70, in Manhattan, from stomach cancer.
