= Too Black, Too Strong =

Too black, too strong is the short form of a Malcolm X quotation from his "Message to the Grass Roots". It may also refer to:

- "Bring the Noise", a Public Enemy track that uses the Malcolm X sample
- "I'll House You", a Jungle Brothers track that uses the Malcolm X sample
- Too Black, Too strong, a 2001 poetry collection by Benjamin Zephaniah
- "Wrapped in Black", a Hideki Naganuma track in the video game Sonic Rush that uses the Public Enemy version of the Malcolm X sample.

== See also ==
- 2 Black 2 Strong, an American rapper who recorded in the early 1990s
