= Timeline of the history of the United States (1950–1969) =

This section of the timeline of United States history concerns events from 1950 to 1969.

== 1950s ==
=== Presidency of Harry S. Truman ===
- 1950 – Senator Joseph McCarthy gains power, and McCarthyism (1950–1954) begins
- 1950 – McCarran Internal Security Act
- 1950 – Korean War begins
- 1950 – The comic strip Peanuts, by Charles M. Schulz, is first published
- 1950 – NBC airs Broadway Open House a late-night comedy, variety, talk show through 1951. Hosted by Morey Amsterdam and Jerry Lester and Dagmar, it serves as the prototype for The Tonight Show
- 1950 – Failed assassination attempt by two Puerto Rican nationals on President Harry S. Truman while he was living at Blair House.
- 1951 – 22nd Amendment, establishing term limits for president.
- 1951 – Mutual Security Act
- 1951 – General Douglas MacArthur fired by President Truman for comments about using nuclear weapons on China
- 1951 – The first live transcontinental television broadcast takes place in San Francisco, California from the Japanese Peace Treaty Conference. One month later, the situation comedy I Love Lucy premieres on CBS, sparking the rise of television in the American home and the Golden Age of Television.
- 1951 – See It Now, an American newsmagazine and documentary series broadcast by CBS from 1951 to 1958. It was created by Edward R. Murrow and Fred W. Friendly, Murrow being the host of the show.
- 1951 – The Catcher in the Rye is published by J. D. Salinger and invigorates the rebellious youth of the period, eventually earning the title of a Classic with its profound impact.
- 1952 – The debut of the Today show on NBC, originally hosted by Dave Garroway is the fourth longest running talk show on television.
- 1952 – ANZUS Treaty enters into force
- 1952 – Immigration and Nationality Act
- 1952 – 1952 United States presidential election: Dwight D. Eisenhower elected as president, Richard Nixon elected as vice president

=== Presidency of Dwight D. Eisenhower ===
- January 20, 1953 – Eisenhower becomes the 34th president and Nixon becomes the 36th vice president
- 1953 – Rosenbergs executed
- 1953 – Korean Armistice Agreement
- 1953 – Shah of Iran returns to power in CIA-orchestrated coup known as Operation Ajax
- 1954 – The Tournament of Roses Parade becomes the first event nationally televised in color
- 1954 – Four Puerto Rican nationalists attack the House of Representatives, wounding 5 members
- 1954 – Detonation of Castle Bravo, a 15 megaton Hydrogen bomb on Bikini Atoll. 1,000 times more powerful than the Hiroshima and Nagasaki weapons, it vaporized three islands, displaced the islanders and caused long lasting contamination
- 1954 – Joseph McCarthy discredited in Army-McCarthy hearings
- 1954 – Censure or formal disapproval on Senator Joseph McCarthy after the Army-McCarthy hearings. He died three years later in 1957.
- 1954 – President Eisenhower proposes the Domino theory: If South Vietnam fell to communism, so too would all nations of Southeast Asia, and eventually worldwide.
- 1954 – First Indochina War ends after the U.S. kept sending aid to the French. France was defeated by Ho Chi Minh and his army at the Battle of Dien Bien Phu.
- 1954 – The CIA overthrows Guatemala's president Jacobo Arbenz Guzmán (Operation PBSuccess)
- 1954 – Saint Lawrence Seaway Act, permitting the construction of the system of locks, canals and channels that permits ocean-going vessels to travel from the Atlantic Ocean to the North American Great Lakes, is approved
- 1954 – Brown v. Board of Education, a landmark decision of the Supreme Court, declares state laws establishing separate public schools for black and white students and denying black children equal educational opportunities unconstitutional
- 1954 – The U.S. becomes a member of the Southeast Asia Treaty Organization (or SEATO) alliance
- 1954 – Geneva Conference. U.S. rejects the French decision to recognize Communist control of North Vietnam. U.S. increases aid to South Vietnam.
- 1954 – The People's Republic of China lays siege on Quemoy and Matsu Islands; Eisenhower sends in Navy to demonstrate an invasion of Taiwan would not be permitted
- 1954 – The Dow Jones Industrial Average closes at an all-time high of 382.74, the first time the Dow has surpassed its peak level reached just before the Wall Street Crash of 1929
- 1954 – NBC airs The Tonight Show, the first late-night talk show, originally hosted by Steve Allen
- 1954 – The Democrats retake both houses of Congress in the Midterms. Will keep the Senate until 1981 and the House until 1994.
- 1955 – Ray Kroc opens a McDonald's fast food restaurant and, after purchasing the franchise from its original owners, oversees its national (and later, worldwide) expansion
- 1955 – Murder of Emmett Till
- 1955 – Rosa Parks remains seated on a bus, the incident which evolves into the Montgomery bus boycott
- 1955 – AFL and CIO merge in America's largest labor union federation
- 1955 – Warsaw Pact, which establishes a mutual defense treaty subscribed to by eight communist states in Eastern Europe (including the USSR)
- 1955 – Disneyland opens at Anaheim, California
- 1955 – Jonas Salk develops polio vaccine
- 1955 – Rock and roll music enters the mainstream, with "Rock Around the Clock" by Bill Haley & His Comets becoming the first record to top the Billboard pop charts. Elvis Presley also begins his rise to fame around this same time.
- 1955 – Actor James Dean is killed in a highway accident
- 1956 – The controversial 1956 Sugar Bowl takes place. Georgia's pro segregationist governor publicly threatens Georgia' Tech's president to not allow the game to take place, as students riot.
- 1956 – President Eisenhower secures passages of Interstate Highway Act, which will construct 41,000 miles (66,000 km) of the Interstate Highway System over a 20-year period
- 1956 – The U.S. refuses to provide military support the Hungarian Revolution
- 1956 – Elvis Presley appears on The Ed Sullivan Show for the first time.
- 1956 – Marilyn Monroe marries playwright Arthur Miller.
- 1956 – Jackson Pollock dies in a car crash
- 1956 – 1956 United States presidential election: Dwight D. Eisenhower is reelected president, Richard Nixon reelected vice president
- 1956 – "In God We Trust" adopted as national motto
- January 20, 1957 – President Eisenhower and Vice President Nixon begin second terms
- 1957 – Eisenhower Doctrine, wherein a country could request American economic assistance and/or aid from military forces if it was being threatened by armed aggression from another state
- 1957 – Civil Rights Act of 1957, primarily a voting rights bill, becomes the first civil rights legislation enacted by Congress since Reconstruction
- 1957 – Soviets launch Sputnik; "space race" begins
- 1957 – Shippingport Atomic Power Station, the first commercial nuclear power plant in the U.S., goes into service
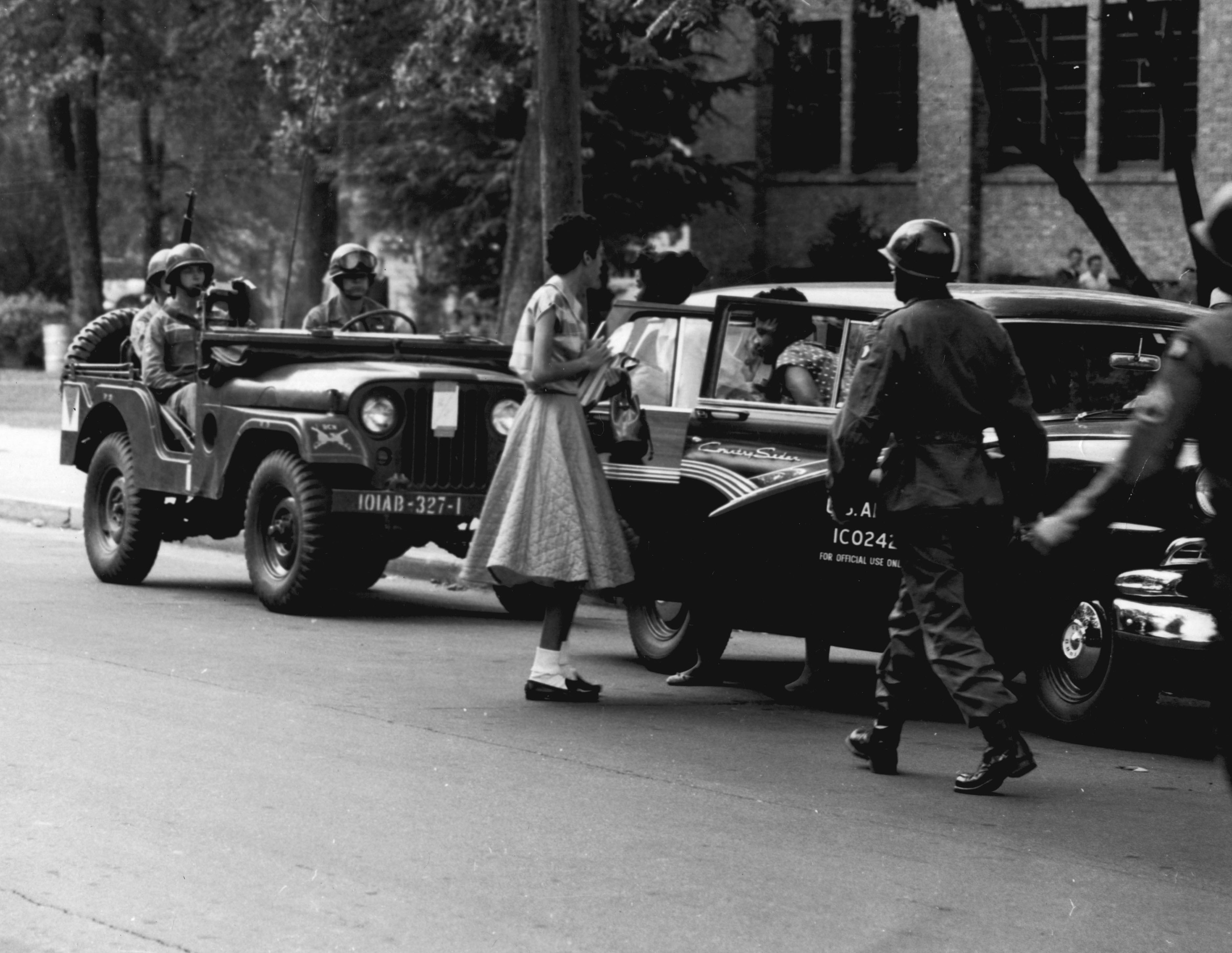
- 101st Airborne escorting the Little Rock Nine to school
- 1957 – Little Rock, Arkansas school desegregation. Eisenhower recruits the U.S. National Guard to escort the Little Rock Nine
- 1958 – National Defense Education Act
- 1958 - The Affluent Society written by John Galbraith
- 1958 – NASA formed as the U.S. begins ramping up efforts to explore space
- 1958 – Jack Kilby invents the integrated circuit
- 1959 – The NBC western Bonanza becomes the first drama to be broadcast in color
- 1959 – Cuban Revolution
- 1959 – Landrum–Griffin Act, a labor law that regulates labor unions' internal affairs and their officials' relationships with employers, becomes law
- 1959 – Alaska and Hawaii became the 49th and 50th U.S. states; as of January 2025, they are the final two states admitted to the union.
- 1959 – Buddy Holly, Ritchie Valens, and The Big Bopper are killed in Clear Lake, Iowa in a plane crash.

== 1960s ==
- 1960 – U-2 incident, wherein a CIA U-2 spy plane was shot down while flying a reconnaissance mission over Soviet Union airspace
- 1960 – Greensboro sit-ins, sparked by four African American college students refusing to move from a segregated lunch counter, and the Nashville sit-ins, spur similar actions and increases sentiment in the Civil Rights Movement.
- 1960 – Author Harper Lee publishes To Kill A Mockingbird
- 1960 – Civil Rights Act of 1960, establishing federal inspection of local voter registration polls and penalties for those attempting to obstruct someone's attempt to register to vote or actually vote
- 1960 – National Front for the Liberation of Vietnam formed
- 1960 – John Fitzgerald Kennedy defeats vice president under the Eisenhower administration, Republican Richard Milhous Nixon. The campaign included the first televised United States presidential debate.
- 1960 – 1960 United States presidential election: John F. Kennedy elected president, Lyndon B. Johnson elected vice president
- 1961 – US breaks diplomatic relations with Cuba
- 1961 – Eisenhower gives celebrated "military–industrial complex" farewell address

=== Presidency of John F. Kennedy ===
- January 20, 1961 – Kennedy becomes the 35th president, Johnson becomes the 37th vice president
- 1961 – 23rd Amendment, which grants electors to the District of Columbia
- 1961 – Peace Corps established
- 1961 – Alliance for Progress
- 1961 – Bay of Pigs Invasion
- 1961 – Alan Shepard pilots the Freedom 7 capsule to become the first American in space
- 1961 – Trade embargo on Cuba
- 1961 – Berlin Crisis of 1961
- 1961 – Vietnam War officially begins with 900 military advisors landing in Saigon
- 1961 – OPEC (The Organization of Petroleum Exporting Countries) formed
- 1962 – Trade Expansion Act
- 1962 – Andy Warhol becomes famous for his Campbell's Soup Cans painting
- 1962 – John Glenn orbits the Earth in Friendship 7, becoming the first American to do so
- 1962 – Cuban Missile Crisis, the closest nuclear confrontation involving the U.S. and USSR
- 1962 – Baker v. Carr, enabling federal courts to intervene in and to decide reapportionment cases
- 1962 – Engel v. Vitale, determines that it is unconstitutional for state officials to compose an official school prayer and require its recitation in public schools
- 1962 – Students for a Democratic Society (SDS)
- 1962 – The comic-book superhero Spider-Man debuts in Amazing Fantasy #15 (August 1962) by Marvel Comics
- 1962 – Marilyn Monroe dies of apparent acute barbiturate poisoning at 36
- 1963 – Bob Dylan and Columbia Records release The Freewheelin' Bob Dylan (his second studio album), which becomes a classic
- 1963 – Civil rights activist Medgar Evers assassinated outside his home by Byron De La Beckwith
- 1963 – Atomic Test Ban Treaty
- 1963 - The Birmingham campaign and its Children's Crusade focus attention on the civil rights movement
- 1963 – March on Washington; Martin Luther King Jr. "I Have a Dream" speech
- 1963 – The Feminine Mystique by Betty Friedan published, sparking the women's liberation movement
- 1963 – Community Mental Health Act signed by Kennedy

=== Presidency of Lyndon B. Johnson ===
- November 22, 1963 – President Kennedy assassinated in Dallas; Vice President Johnson becomes the 36th president.
- 1963 – The man accused of assassinating President Kennedy, Lee Harvey Oswald, is shot and killed by Dallas nightclub owner Jack Ruby. The assassination marks the first 24-hour coverage of a major news event by the major networks.
- 1964 - Ghetto riots (1964–1969), beginning with the Harlem riot of 1964
- 1964 – The Beatles arrive in the U.S., and subsequent appearances on The Ed Sullivan Show, mark the start of the British Invasion (or, an increased number of rock and pop performers from the United Kingdom who became popular around the world, including the U.S.)
- 1964 – Tonkin Gulf incident; Gulf of Tonkin Resolution
- 1964 – 24th Amendment, prohibiting both Congress and the states from conditioning the right to vote in federal elections on payment of a poll tax or other types of tax
- 1964 – President Johnson proposes the Great Society, whose social reforms were aimed at the elimination of poverty and racial injustice. New major spending programs that addressed education, medical care, urban problems, and transportation were launched later in the 1960s.
- 1964 – Economic Opportunity Act
- 1964 – Civil Rights Act of 1964, outlawing legalized discrimination based on race, color, religion, sex, and national origin and ended legalized racial segregation in the United States
- 1964 – Panama Canal Zone riots
- 1964 - The Ford Mustang is introduced
- 1964 – In the election, President Johnson won by one of the largest victories in U.S. history, defeating Arizona Republican Senator Barry Goldwater
- 1964 – 1964 United States presidential election: Johnson elected president for a full term, Hubert H. Humphrey elected vice president
- January 20, 1965 – President Johnson begins full term, Humphrey becomes the 38th vice president
- 1965 – President Johnson escalates the United States military involvement in the Vietnam War

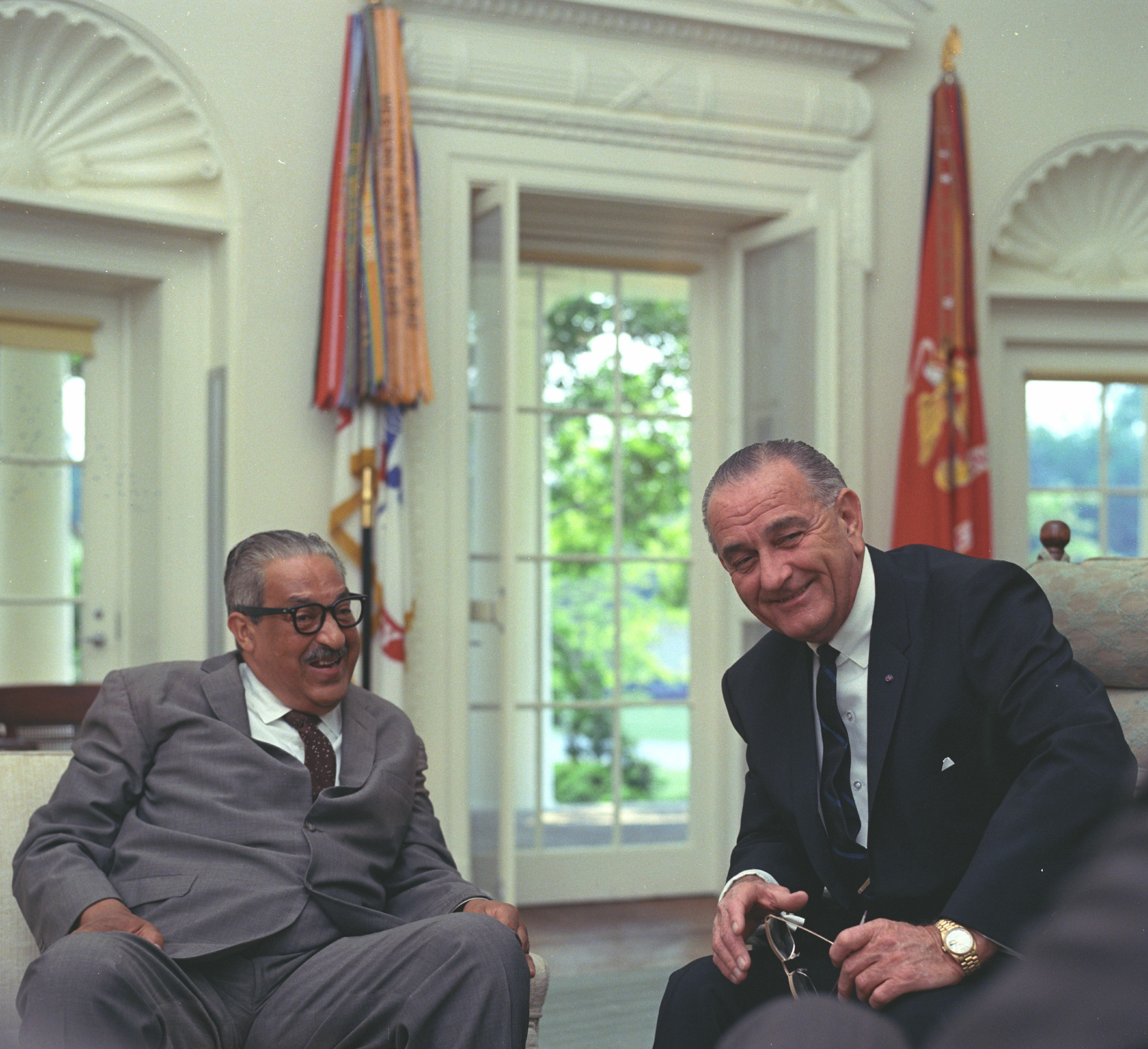
Thurgood Marshall meeting with President Lyndon B. Johnson on the day that Marshall was nominated by Johnson to serve on the Supreme Court

- 1965 – Students for a Democratic Society (SDS) and the Student Nonviolent Coordinating Committee (SNCC), a civil rights activist group, led the first of several anti-war marches in Washington, D.C., with about 25,000 protesters
- 1965 – President Johnson appoints Thurgood Marshall as the first African-American Supreme Court Justice
- 1965 - The Selma to Montgomery marches bring attention to the civil rights movement's call for voting rights
- 1965 – Immigration Act of 1965
- 1965 – Voting Rights Act
- 1965 – Medicaid and Medicare enacted
- 1965 – Higher Education Act of 1965
- 1965 – Malcolm X, an African-American Muslim minister, public speaker, and human rights activist is assassinated in Harlem, New York
- 1965 – The Watts riots in the Watts neighborhood of Los Angeles, lasts six days and is the first of several major urban riots due to racial issues.
- 1966 – Department of Housing and Urban Development (HUD) established
- 1966 – Department of Transportation created
- 1966 – National Traffic and Motor Vehicle Safety Act
- 1966 – Miranda v. Arizona established "Miranda rights" for suspects
- 1966 – Feminist group National Organization for Women (NOW) formed
- 1966 – The three major American television networks—NBC, CBS and ABC—have full color lineups in their prime-time schedules.
- 1966 – Heavyweight boxing champion Muhammad Ali (formerly known as Cassius Clay) declared himself a conscientious objector and refused to go to war. In 1967 Ali was sentenced to five years in prison for draft evasion, but his conviction was later overturned on appeal. In addition, he was stripped of his title and banned from professional boxing for more than three years.
- 1967 – Jack Ruby died of a pulmonary embolism, secondary to bronchogenic carcinoma (lung cancer), on January 3, 1967, at Parkland Hospital, where Oswald had died and where President Kennedy had been pronounced dead after his assassination.
- 1967 – The first Super Bowl is played, with the Green Bay Packers defeating the Kansas City Chiefs 35–10.
- 1967 – Detroit race riot precipitates the "Long Hot Summer of 1967", when race riots erupt in 159 cities nationwide.
- 1967 – The Outsiders published by S.E. Hinton
- 1967 – Glassboro Summit Conference between U.S. president Lyndon Johnson and Soviet Premier Alexei Kosygin
- 1967 – The "Summer of Love" embodies the growing counterculture, with the Monterey Pop Festival and Scott McKenzie's "San Francisco (Be Sure to Wear Flowers in Your Hair)" among the highlights.
- 1967 – 25th Amendment establishes succession to the presidency and procedures for filling a vacancy in the office of the vice president
- 1967 – American Samoa becomes self-governing under a new constitution
- 1968 – On March 31, incumbent President Lyndon B. Johnson announces to the nation on television that he will not seek re-election. Opposition toward him and the Democratic Party was growing. The escalation of Vietnam was one of these issues.
- 1968 – Assassination of Martin Luther King Jr.
- 1968 – The National Front for the Liberation of Vietnam launches the Tet Offensive
- 1968 – Civil Rights Act of 1968, commonly known as the Fair Housing Act
- 1968 – A New York Senator and a leading 1968 Democratic presidential candidate, Robert F. Kennedy, is assassinated in Los Angeles after winning the California primary for the Democratic Party's nomination for president, by Sirhan Sirhan.
- 1968 – Police clashes with anti-war protesters in Chicago during the 1968 Democratic National Convention
- 1968 – U.S. signs Nuclear Non-Proliferation Treaty
- 1968 – 1968 United States presidential election: Richard Nixon elected president, Spiro T. Agnew elected vice president; Shirley Chisholm becomes first black woman elected to U.S. Congress
- 1968 – East L.A. walkouts, or Chicano Blowouts
- 1968 – Apollo 8 and its three-astronaut crew orbit the Moon, Earthrise photograph taken
- 1968 – Music group Simon and Garfunkel release "Mrs. Robinson" from their album The Graduate.
- 1968 – President Johnson awards medals of honor to soldiers from Vietnam.

=== Presidency of Richard M. Nixon ===
- January 20, 1969 – Nixon becomes the 37th president, Agnew becomes the 39th vice president
- 1969 – "Vietnamization" begins
- 1969 – Author Maya Angelou publishes I Know Why The Caged Bird Sings
- 1969 – Stonewall riots in New York City marks the start of the modern gay rights movement in the U.S.
- 1969 – Chappaquiddick incident, where Sen. Edward M. Kennedy drives off a bridge on his way home from a party on Chappaquiddick Island, Massachusetts, killing his passenger, Mary Jo Kopechne
- 1969 – Neil Armstrong and Buzz Aldrin walk on the Moon on the Apollo 11 mission
- 1969 – The Woodstock Festival in White Lake, New York, becomes an enormously successful musical and cultural gathering; a milestone for the baby-boom generation
- 1969 – Warren E. Burger appointed Chief Justice of the United States to replace Earl Warren
- 1969 – U.S. bombs North Vietnamese positions in Cambodia and Laos
- 1969 – Sesame Street premieres on National Educational Television.
- 1969 – Secret peace talks with Vietnam begin
- 1969 - Although 100-1 shots at the beginning of the season, the New York Mets win the World Series.

== See also ==
- History of the United States (1945–1964)
- History of the United States (1964–1980)
- Timeline of 1960s counterculture
