= Sanford Katz =

American lawyer (1930–2005)

- Born: Sanford M. Katz; February 1, 1930; The Bronx, New York City, US
- Died: October 6, 2005 (aged 75); Manhattan, New York City, US
- Occupation: Lawyer

Sanford M. Katz (February 1, 1930 – October 6, 2005) was an American lawyer. He served on the defense team of the Panther 21 trial.

== Early life ==
Katz was born on February 1, 1930, in the Bronx. He earned a bachelor's degree from New York University and a law degree from Columbia University in 1952 and 1958, respectively. Between his studies at the universities, he served in the Korean War as a member of the United States Navy aboard a destroyer.

== Career ==
As a lawyer, Katz defended "unpopular defendants in politically charged cases". In 1965, he and Eleanor Jackson Piel represented Bill Epton in his trial for criminal anarchy.

Katz was on the defense team of the Panther 21 trial – an alleged bombing conspiracy, with 13 of the 21 being brought to trial. The trial began on September 8, 1970. On February 26, 1971, he was cited for contempt of court and ordered to either pay a $250 fine or be jailed for 30 days due to being "too sarcastic". Justice John M. Murtagh, who issued the citation, reconsidered it as long as Katz apologized. Katz did, though he did not promise that he would not again be sarcastic, after which his citation was upheld. The trial ended on May 13, 1971 with a full acquittal after three hours of deliberation. After the trial concluded, composer Leonard Bernstein hosted a cocktail party for the defense team in his duplex.

Later in his career, Katz was a member of New York City's 18-B Panel, which provided legal defense to those who could not afford a lawyer. In 1983, he defended Paul Sprecher, a member of the "Sullivanians".

== Personal life and death ==
Katz had three children. He married twice, both times ending in divorce. Until the end of his life, he was in a relationship with television producer Judy Crichton. He died on October 6, 2005, aged 75, in Manhattan, from heart failure.
