= Jesse Gray =

American organizer and politician (1923–1988)

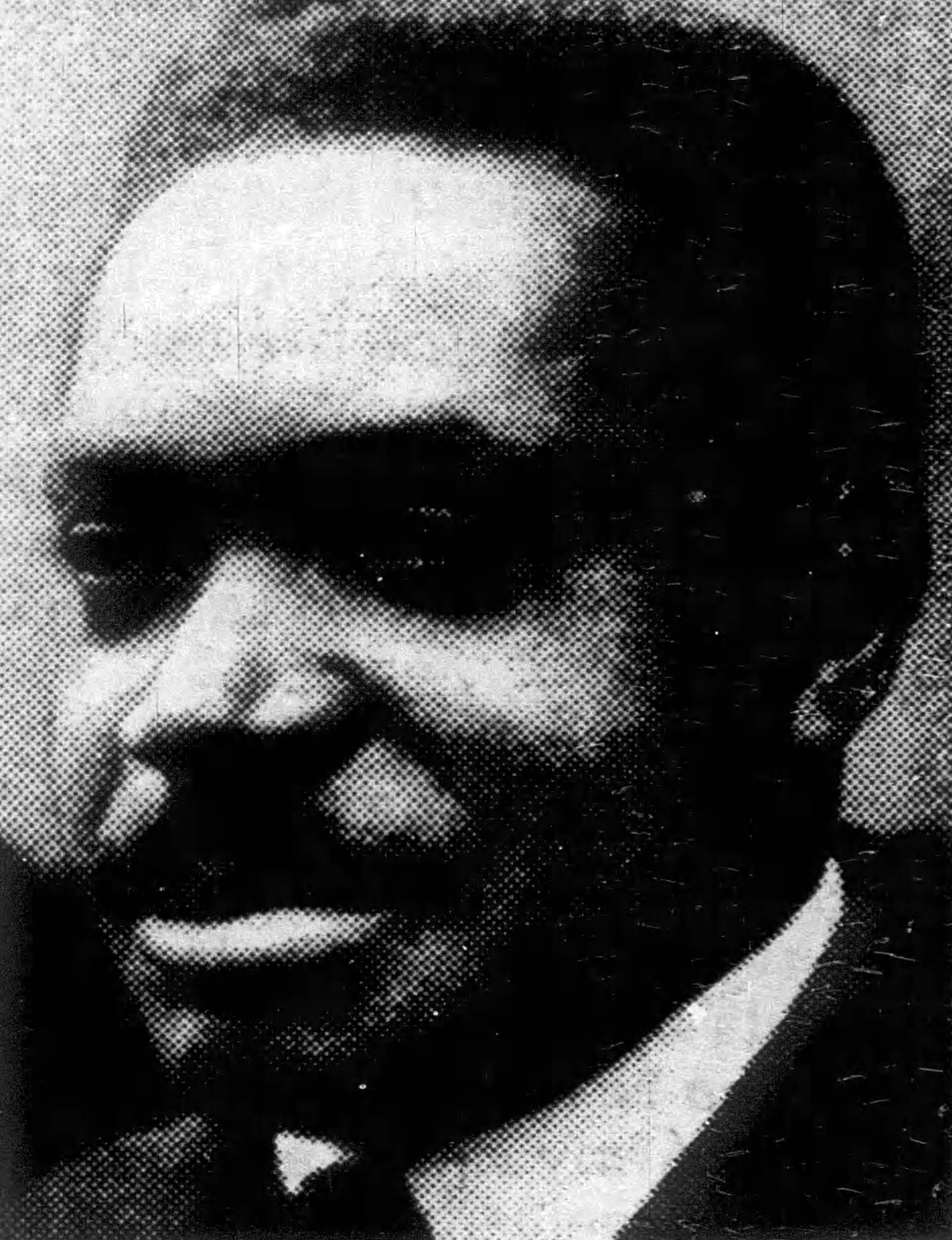
- Gray, c. 1969

Member of the New York State Assembly
- In office 1973 – 1974

Personal details
- Born: Jesse Willard Gray; May 14, 1923 Tunica, Louisiana, US
- Died: January 2, 1988 (aged 64) The Bronx, New York City, US
- Party: Democratic
- Other political affiliations: Communist Party USA (allegedly)
- Education: Southern University; Xavier University of Louisiana
- Occupation: Community organizer, politician

Jesse Willard Gray (or Willord; May 14, 1923 – January 2, 1988) was an American community organizer and politician.

Born in Louisiana, Gray later moved to New York City. There, he was a housing rights activist who helped organize multiple rent strikes, notably in 1963 and from 1965 to 1968. On multiple occasions, he was arrested for his activism. He served in the New York State Assembly from 1973 to 1974, and ran for New York City elections such as those for City Council and for Mayor.

== Early life ==
Jesse Willard Gray was born on May 14, 1923, in Tunica, Louisiana, the youngest of ten children born to Samuel Gray and Lottie Clark. He grew up in Gert Town and studied at Southern University and the Xavier University of Louisiana. He registered into the United States Armed Forces on June 30, 1942, during World War II. He served in the United States Merchant Marine and was a member of the National Maritime Union. He later moved to New York City, first working as a tailor there.

== Community organizing ==
In 1952, Gray joined the Harlem Tenants Council and began organizing. He was accused of being an organizer for the Communist Party USA in Harlem. In February 1960, he testified before the House Un-American Activities Committee. In his testimony, he denied being an active member of the Communist Party, but pled the 5th when asked about his prior membership. He worked on Benjamin J. Davis Jr.'s Senate campaigns in 1952 and 1958. He later said he did so because he felt Davis had a right to run for office. Following a 1963 rent strike, anonymous people wrote to newspapers claiming Gray was a communist.

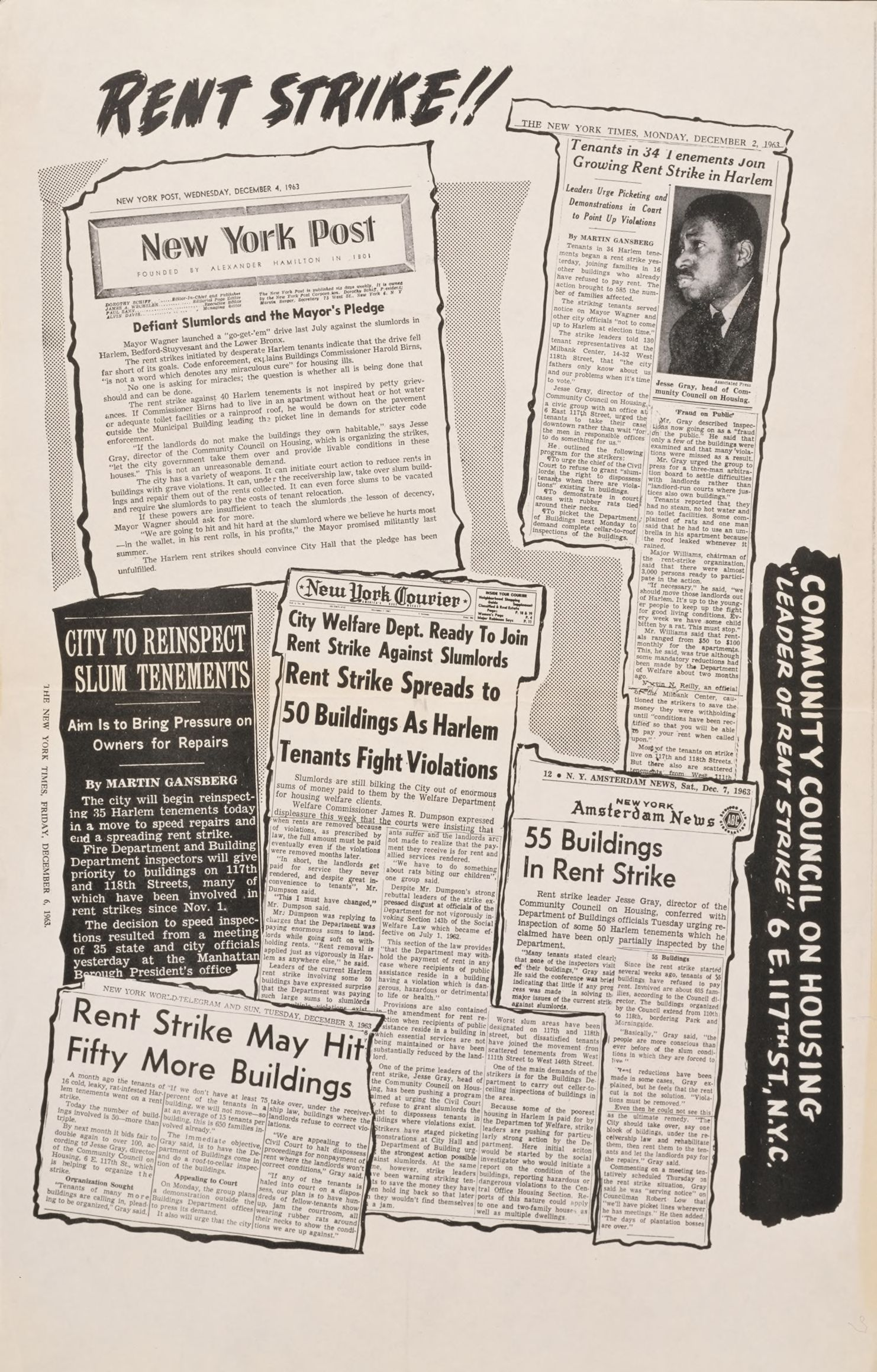
Gray on a poster by the Community Council on Housing detailing the 1963 rent strike

In 1958, Gray founded the Lower Harlem Tenants Council, the predecessor to the Community Council on Housing. He adopted the rent strike as an organization method after he awoke one morning to find the heating in his apartment did not work. He unsuccessfully attempted to organized one in 1959. In November 1963, he led a successful widespread rent strike, involving 30,000 Harlen tenants. To emphasize bad conditions and infestations, tenants caught rats in their tenements and showed them to the judge of the New York City Civil Court. Between 300 and 500 buildings and 15,000 tenants participated in the strike, with Gray unsuccessfully attempting to make the strike citywide.

During the Harlem riot of 1964, Newsday named Gray and Bill Epton as key figures in the riots, as they organized and spoke to the public at the time. According to journalist Junius Griffin, Gray, on July 18, entered Mount Morris Ascension Presbyterian Church with a bandaged face, which he claimed to be caused by a police beating, and called for at least 100 people to participate in guerrilla warfare; Griffin stood by these claims in a testimony to the New York Supreme Court on July 28, 1964. Gray also led protests in Jersey City, New Jersey at the time. In 1966, he testified before a court, with him being ordered by the New York Supreme Court to give all of what he knew about the riot.

In 1964, Gray received a 60-day suspended sentence after being found guilty of interfering with an officer who was attempting to evict a resident. During the event, he and ten other people were arrested, including photographer Don Hogan Charles.

For a time, Gray was chairman of a black power organization. In December 1964, he founded the Federation for Independent Political Action (FIPA), a black political organization. He then worked for the Farm Labor Organizing Committee during the Tulare labor camps rent strike, after which he founded the National Tenents Organization (NTO). For a time, he led the City-Wide Coordinating Committee on Housing, and from June to August 1971, led the Harlem Tenents Union. He also founded Harlem Back Street Youth Incorporated, which received funding from the Office of Economic Opportunity. He pushed for United States Congress to pass the Rat Extermination Act of 1967, which would have allocated funding to control rat infestations in slums.

Gray was an associate of Malcolm X, with Gray stating that Malcolm taught him to "be mean and black, and hate the white man". In 1964, he helped draft the charter for the Organization of Afro-American Unity. With the FIPA, he called for stores on 125th Street to close for the mourning of Malcolm following his assassination. A file from the Federal Bureau of Investigation called him a black nationalist.

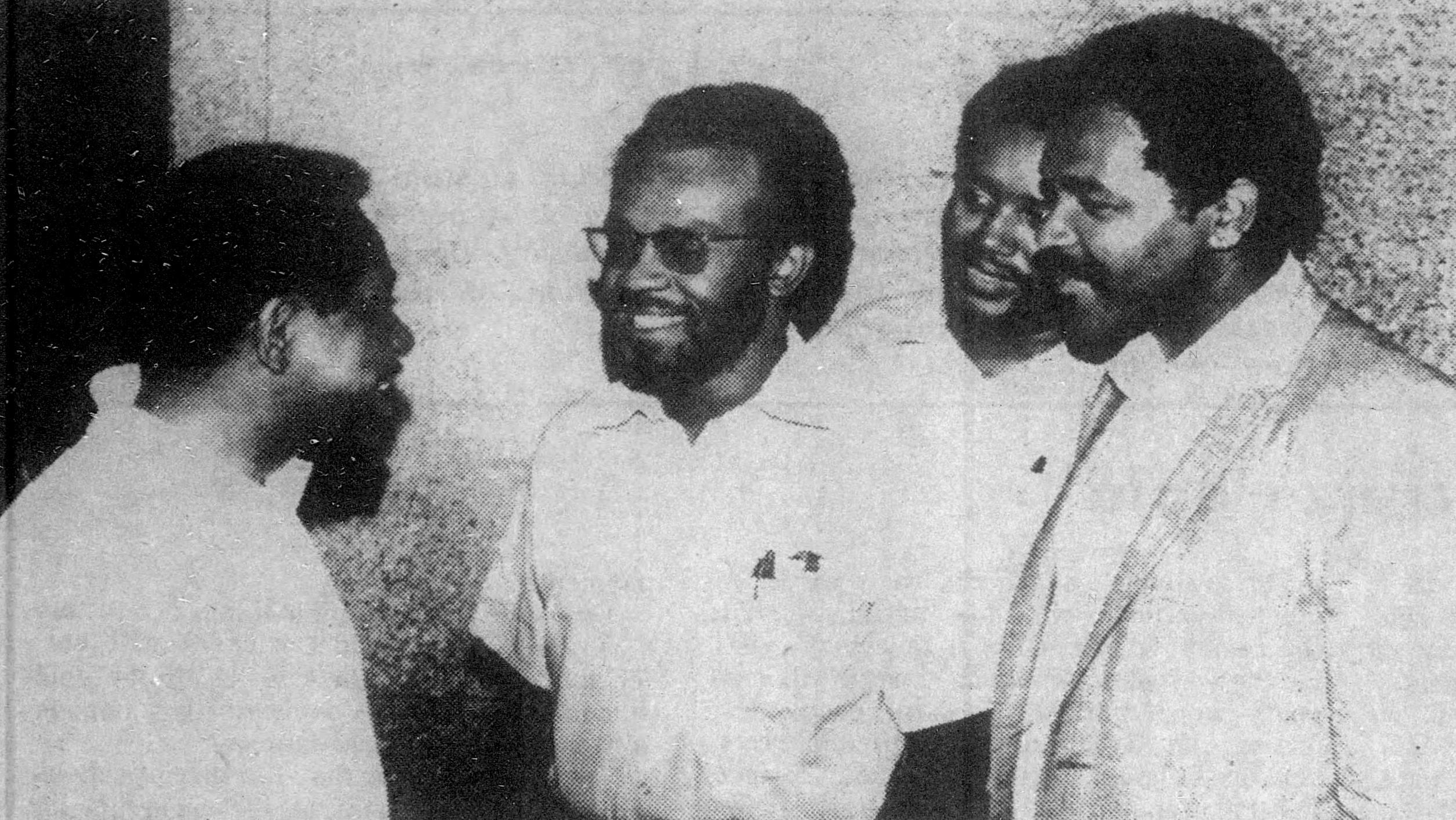
East Coast tenant leaders at a conference in Philadelphia, July 29, 1969. Left to right: Jesse Gray, NTO executive director; Edward Darden, program director; Tony Henry, director of nationwide tenants committee; George Parrish, eastern region coordinator.

On June 23, 1966, Gray organized a group of approximately 35 people, of which included philosopher Maxine Greene, to perform a sit-in at New York City Hall to protest a lack of jobs for teenagers. At the same time, a group of landlords were protesting rent regulation there, and the two groups fought. Gray, Greene, and 21-year-old Robert Vaughan were arrested; Gray was charged with disorderly conduct, interfering with an arrest, and resisting arrest. By his request, he was paroled until July 13 of that year. On July 13, he testified before the New York City Civilian Complaint Review Board, with him saying he was beaten by eight police officers during his arrest. On March 19, 1970, he was removed from a City Council meeting for heckling, which caused about 200 tenents to leave with him. On June 23, 1973, he was evicted from his apartment for nonpayment.

Besides housing rights, Gray organized against other injustices. His role in the Harlem riot of 1964 regarded police brutality. In 1964 and in 1965, he led protests against police brutality, with the former taking place in front of the Headquarters of the United Nations. In 1966, he led a protest against segregation at IS 201.

Gray did not believe that tenents should resist within existing systems, and in 1969 advised tenents to instead "move against the establishment" and to "not let lawyers lead the struggle". He argued for solidarity among the poor and the middle class, and among the slums in all parts of New York City. He stated the end goal of his organizing was for the government to seize and operate housing. An opponent of the Harlem slums, he focused his efforts on fighting for improving the living conditions of tenents. The New York Times called him a militant of housing rights.

== Electoral politics ==
Gray was a member of the Democratic Party. He unsuccessfully ran for New York City Council in 1961, then ran again in 1969, winning the Democratic primaries in the latter but losing the general election. He attempted to run in the Democratic primaries of the 1965 New York City mayoral elections, but his place in the primaries was challenged by the New York Supreme Court, as some of the signatures which got him there were believed to be forged; he withdrew from the election.

In 1970, Gray challenged the seat of Adam Clayton Powell Jr., losing the election. From 1973 to 1974, he was a member of the New York State Assembly, losing the following primary. In 1973, he entered into the Democratic primaries in the New York City mayoral elections, as the seventh politician to do so that year; he lost.

== Personal life, death, and legacy ==
Gray lived in the Queensbridge Houses. He was married to Rosalee Gray, who he separated from c. 1964. On March 15, 1966, he was accused of assaulting his wife and arrested, with the case later being dismissed. He had a daughter, Gail, and had a son, Jesse Gray Jr. According to the card for his conscription, he was 5 ft 7 in (1.70 m), weighed 122 pounds (55 kg), and had black eyes and black hair.

Gray's son, Jesse Jr., was a heroin dealer. The New York City Police Department (NYPD) stated that Jesse Jr. had been an active dealer since at least the 1970s. In 1973, he was added to the NYPD's list of "100 major narcotics violators". He was arrested in 1972 and 1982, both times being charged with drug possession with intent to distribute. During the latter arrest, authorities estimated that he earned $1,000,000 per week.

Gray fell in a coma in 1983, dying on January 2, 1988, aged 64, at the Beth Abraham Center in the Bronx. His funeral was held on April 9, at the Abyssinian Baptist Church. During the funeral, jazz musicians Wilber Morris and Claude Lawrence played a composition in his honor.

During the 100th United States Congress, John Conyers introduced the Jesse Gray Housing Act in his honor. An amendment to the Housing Act of 1937, it would have allocated $5,000,000 annually for 10 years in order to build 500,000 public housing units. It did not pass.

New York State Assembly
Preceded by Hulan Jack	New York State Assembly; 70th District; 1973–1974	Succeeded by Marie M. Runyon
