= Canadian Party of Labour =

- Founded: 1969
- Dissolved: 1984
- Newspaper: Canadian Worker; L’Ouvrier
- Ideology: Communism; Marxism–Leninism; Anti-revisionism
- Political position: Far-left
- Regional affiliation: Progressive Labor Party

The Canadian Party of Labour was a Marxist–Leninist political party in Canada. The CPL was not an electoral party, but a revolutionary party attempting to assemble a mass movement of workers and affiliated organizations who could lead a communist revolution. It was a fraternal party of the Progressive Labor Party in the United States until circa 1979, when the two organizations disagreed over the question of Quebec self-determination. The group was in existence from the late 1960s to the early 1980s and was most active in British Columbia, Ontario and Quebec where a number of its members achieved office in the United Steel Workers of America and the Canadian Union of Postal Workers.

The party described its decision-making process as "democratic centralism":

Decisions are reached through broad discussion within the party. The clubs, city executives and national committee of the party are all involved in democratic discussion to develop and modify the lines. Once a decision is arrived at we rely on centralism to see that it is carried out. What is important is that decisions are not only widely discussed, but that they are implemented as well. There's nothing more undemocratic than an organization that decides nothing because it is always "discussing", and therefore never implementing the will of the majority of its members.

== See also ==
- List of anti-revisionist groups
