= Burn Baby Burn =

"Burn, baby! Burn!" is a slogan attributed to the 1960s R&B disc jockey Magnificent Montague, which became associated with the 1965 Watts Riots. It can also refer to:

== Poems ==
- "Burn Baby Burn" (poem), by Marvin X following the Watts Riots

== Music ==
- "Burn, Baby, Burn", a 1966 song by Jimmy Collier and Frederick Douglass Kirkpatrick
- "Burn Baby Burn", a 1974 song by Hudson Ford
- "Burn", a 1975 song by Bruce Cockburn
- "Disco Inferno", a 1976 song by The Trammps
- "Burn Baby Burn", a 1990 rap song by 2 Black 2 Strong
- Burn, Baby, Burn!, a 1993 album by the Electric Hellfire Club
- "Burn Baby Burn" (song), a 2001 song by Ash
- "Burn, Baby, Burn", a 2019 song by Sea Power for the Disco Elysium soundtrack
- "Burn Baby Burn", a 2020 song by Armageddon Dildos on their Dystopia album.

== Television ==
- "Burns, Baby Burns", a 1996 episode of the TV series The Simpsons'

== Books ==
- Burn, Baby, Burn! The Los Angeles Race Riot, August 1965 (1966), a journalistic account of the Watts riots by Jerry Cohen and William S. Murphy
- Burn Baby Burn (novel), a 2016 young adult novel by Meg Medina

== Other ==
- "BURN, BABY, BURN -- MASTER IGNITION ROUTINE" was used as the name of the primary ignition module in the source code for the Apollo Guidance Computer for Apollo 11.

== See also ==
- Drill, baby, drill
- The Baby-Roast, an urban legend
