= International Committee Against Racism =

US political organization

International Committee Against Racism (InCAR)
- Abbreviation: InCAR
- Formation: 1973 at New York University
- Type: Militant anti-racist political organisation
- Purpose: Anti-racism
- Location(s): Various nations, principally U.S. and Latin America
- Members: Organization dissolved (1996); absorbed into Progressive Labor Party

The International Committee Against Racism was the "mass organization" of the Progressive Labor Party in the United States. It was founded in 1973 once it had become clear that the Worker Student Alliance section of the Students for a Democratic Society could not sustain itself and that a new group with a more long-term vision not focused on students was going to be needed. Anti-racism was chosen as the focus for that new group.

== History ==
Early leaders of the group included Dr. Robert Kinlock, Toby Schwartz, and Finley Campbell. At first the group took the name "Committee Against Racism" (CAR), but as various Latin American members began to start chapters in their home countries, CAR added "International" to the beginning of its name and became InCAR, proclaiming itself to have not just a U.S. anti-racist focus, but a worldwide one as well.

In 1975 the Committee Against Racism conducted their Summer Project in support of integration and busing in Boston, MA. A joint Freedom School and Petition Campaign culminated in an attempt to have a presence outside South Boston High School on the first day of Phase II busing. Two bus loads of protesters were taken off the buses before reaching the high school, detained and released by police.

By 1978 InCAR had about 1,500 members. It had a magazine periodical for its written work, known as Arrow (Flecha in Spanish), published bilingually.

For the most part, PLP did not bother to hide that it was in charge of InCAR, but it did always choose to frame its role in InCAR as one of "leadership" rather than control. According to PL's party statement: "InCAR is a radical organization led by the Party which the Party builds in order to advance the struggle for communism." InCAR, for its own part, insisted in its mission statement (reprinted on the inside front cover of every Arrow issue) that it "recognizes the absolute necessity of unity of communists and non-communists in this struggle" against both societal and organized racism.

Like PLP as a whole, InCAR was often active in protesting racist rallies held by the Ku Klux Klan, Nazis, and other white supremacists. InCAR sometimes earned fear from these groups: the KKK in the 1980s told the Hartford Courant that "it's because of those commies in InCAR and PLP that our boys are afraid to come out in public wearing their hoods."

Of all the anti-racist actions InCAR took over the years, the best known among the general US public and intellectuals has remained one particular event early in their history having to do with their opposition to sociobiology, made most widely known in recent years by Arthur Jensen, but also involving a few theorists before him. In February 1978 at a symposium held by the American Association for the Advancement of Science, members of InCAR assaulted biologist Edward O. Wilson by rushing the stage chanting, "Racist Wilson you can't hide, we charge you with genocide!" Members then doused Wilson with water. The symposium's moderator Alexander Alland, along with Stephen Jay Gould, took the microphone, apologized to Wilson, and condemned the attack as an inappropriate way to attack sociobiology. Wilson, still wet, gave his speech and received a prolonged standing ovation, but later recalled that after the attack "No one asked them to leave the premises, no police were called, and no action was taken against them later."

InCAR was quietly disbanded in 1996 as PLP decided, for both strategic and financial reasons, to continue InCAR's intense anti-racist work only from within PLP. The party began to argue that itself and InCAR had many duplicate memberships, duplicate or highly similar articles for publication across both the party's newspaper Challenge and InCAR's magazine Arrow, duplicate international chapters similarly containing overlapping memberships, and that all of this was highly costly as well as being fundamentally unnecessary. As long as PLP was going to continue to advocate communism openly, it was argued, then it was pointless to try to maintain a separate organization into which non-communists could "slowly and gradually" be won to the party's ideas. Lastly, as a practical matter, InCAR was simply not getting enough recruits to remain valuable to PL as a separate entity.

The decision to disband InCAR gave an extra boost to a renewed PL P focus on "basebuilding" in the working class, a theory that rests heavily upon what InCAR was designed to do—win the masses gradually and genuinely to a fully communist world outlook. The difference, PLP now argues, is that the slow and gradual process is now being conducted directly into a communist party, rather than first to anti-racism, and then to communism, as it had been previously thought was necessary to do.

PLP today holds to a fierce rejection of the Maoist doctrine of mass line that calls for a more liberal line when working with the masses versus a fully communist-ideology party line to be used within the ideology and functioning of the actual Party. Its rejection of that principle in the mid-1990s as essentially dishonest (it today calls for "one line" across all its political functioning) made the disbanding of InCAR all the more likely.
