= 2 Black 2 Strong =

American rapper

- Born: John Mars; 1968 (age 57–58)
- Origin: Harlem
- Genres: Hip-hop, political rap
- Occupation: Rapper
- Years active: Early 1990s
- Labels: Relativity, Effect/Clappers

John Mars, known as 2 Black 2 Strong (born 1968), is an American rapper who recorded in the early 1990s. He is best known for his song "Burn Baby Burn", about the right to burn the American flag. He led a crew of rappers, MMG (Militant Manhattan Gangsters or Mighty Motherfuckin' Gangsters), which appeared on many of his tracks.

== Early life ==
2 Black 2 Strong is the professional name of John Mars. He was 22 years old in January 1991, so he was likely born in 1968.

== Career ==
=== Burn Baby Burn EP ===
"Burn Baby Burn," (Note: For other songs with the same title, see Burn Baby Burn.) recorded in 1990, features a guest verse from Chuck D. The song, about the right to burn the American flag, was controversial. A pressing plant, Sonopress, refused to press it, and Musicland and Sam Goody refused to carry it. The song was released on an EP of the same name by Effect/Clappers. Robert Christgau, in The Village Voice, gave it an honorable mention rating, specifically highlighting "Burn Baby Burn." Gregory Lee Johnson, an activist who had a flag-burning conviction overturned by the Supreme Court of the United States, introduces the song. (Note: Parenthetically, in the United States, the Supreme Court of the United States has recognized flag burning as being protected by the First Amendment. On 21 June 1989, a 5-4 "deeply divided' court upheld the rights of protesters to burn the American flag in Texas v. Johnson, a landmark First Amendment decision.)

=== Doin' Hard Time on Planet Earth ===
2 Black 2 Strong, backed by MMG, released his debut album in 1991 on Relativity Records. Doin' Hard Time on Planet Earth received positive reviews from critics. Alex Henderson, in AllMusic, called it "one of the strongest -- and most unjustly neglected -- rap releases of 1991... a riveting, gutsy work that makes its share of highly valid points when addressing social and political issues." Henderson went on to write that "unfortunately, as the '90s progressed, 2 Black 2 Strong remained undeservedly obscure." Christgau also praised the album, awarding it a B+ grade and writing: "The music of this Harlem crew is loud beats anchored to spare guitar, the hip hop obverse of death metal if death metal didn't always strain for drama... Without reveling in brutality for its own sake, they state the amoral facts as they understand them--or misunderstand them, if it makes any difference." One track, "War on Drugs," addresses the possibility of the federal government's role in the crack epidemic.

== Discography ==
- Burn Baby Burn EP, In Effect/Clappers, 1990
- Doin' Hard Time on Planet Earth, Relativity/Clappers, 1991
