= Worker Student Alliance =

- Abbreviation: WSA
- Formation: December 1968
- Dissolved: 1974
- Purpose: Building a worker-student alliance for revolutionary socialism Opposition to imperialism, racism, and nationalism in the New Left
- Parent organization: Students for a Democratic Society; Progressive Labor Party

The Worker Student Alliance (WSA) in the United States was the section of Students for a Democratic Society led by the Progressive Labor Party. The WSA argued that the best way to build a movement in the working class, like SDS wanted, was for students to become involved in workers' struggles both on and off the campuses. In practice, that usually meant students enrolled in school would get jobs as cafeteria hands and other manual labor jobs at those schools.

== Organizational history ==
The WSA explicitly rejected the rest of the New Left's insistence that it would be various combinations of 'progressive' nationalism and popular rebellion that would jump-start the revolution; rather, the WSA said the catalyst would be organized workers in various industries and the service sector, and that students could best help spread and deepen workers' class consciousness by really being among the workers themselves, rather than just using their class designation in rhetoric to appear more Marxist.

The WSA faction took about 900 of the approximately 1400 representatives in the split at the 1969 SDS convention in Chicago. The other 500, who had been the Revolutionary Youth Movement, left to form a myriad of other groups. SDS chapters around the country then split along these same lines, or disbanded entirely.

Both the RYM and the WSA kept the SDS name, but the Weatherman organization continued to hold the SDS National Office and all the SDS membership lists; thus it was able to assume effective "command" of the name and public face of SDS despite its inferior size. Nearly immediately post-conference, Weatherman led their "Days of Rage" Chicago riots of 1969 and other sporadic acts of violence — all under the SDS name — until 1970, when Mark Rudd and a few other Weathermen decided to close the SDS National Office and drop the SDS name. PL, however, continued to keep its SDS for several more years. Since all active SDS chapters after 1970 were SDS-WSA, the "WSA" initials were dropped.

In 1974 PL's SDS voted to dissolve itself and join the Committee Against Racism which PL had helped to form at a conference at New York University in November 1973. The CAR eventually expanded to several other countries and added "International" to its name to become InCAR, but InCAR was in many respects another "mass organization" led and directed by the PLP, with separate publications and staff, but always with a goal of winning InCAR members to support PLP. By 1996, this strategy was too much to maintain, and PLP elected to pursue pure and open communist activity again, using only its own party as an organizational structure.
