= 1971 Vietnam veteran medal-throwing protest =

American antiwar protest

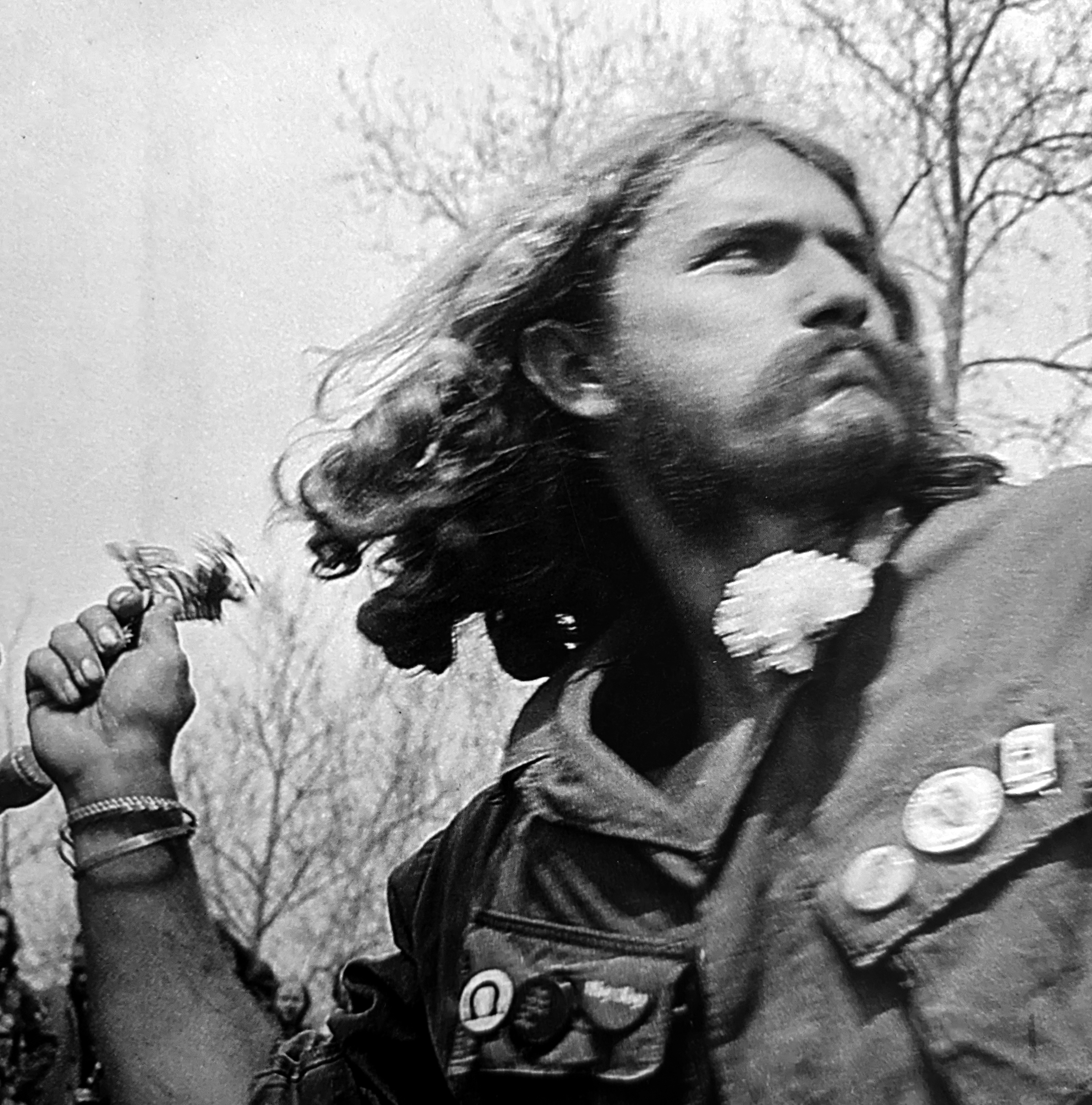
Vietnam Veteran Throwing Medal at the U.S. Capital

On April 23, 1971 Vietnam Veterans Against the War staged what was arguably "one of the most dramatic and influential events of the antiwar movement" as hundreds of Vietnam veterans, dressed in combat fatigues and well worn uniforms, stepped up, and angrily, one after another for three straight hours, hurled their military medals, ribbons, discharge papers, and even a cane, onto the steps of the U.S. Capitol. Many of them paused to speak, expressing sentiments ranging from "I pray that time will forgive me and my brothers for what we did" to "I got a purple heart and I hope I get another one fighting these mother-fuckers."

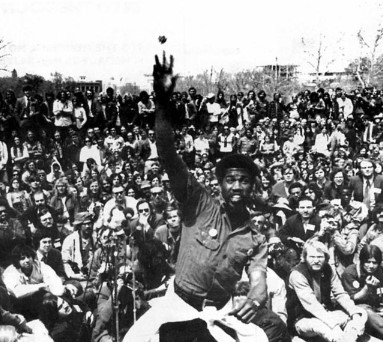
Veteran Throwing His Medals as Others Wait Their Turn. Photo by Fred W. McDarrah

There has never been an antiwar or anti-government protest anything like this in the U.S. before or since. The very soldiers who had been sent to fight were back home—many bearing the physical and mental wounds of war, some riding in wheelchairs—at the doorsteps of the government which sent them, testifying to what they had witnessed and come to understand, saying the war was wrong; demanding it end. An editorial in the Akron Beacon Journal called the veterans "men of conscience" and said, of "all the demonstrations" against the war, "none has had greater impact". It continued, arguing that veteran testimony "must inevitably carry more weight than the protests or endorsements of those who have never seen this war firsthand." A member of the Daughters of the American Revolution, a patriotic organization which was holding its annual convention in Washington that week, approached one of the protesting veterans and said, "'Son, I don't think what you're doing is good for the troops.'" The veteran replied: "'Lady, we are the troops.'"

== Operation Dewey Canyon III ==
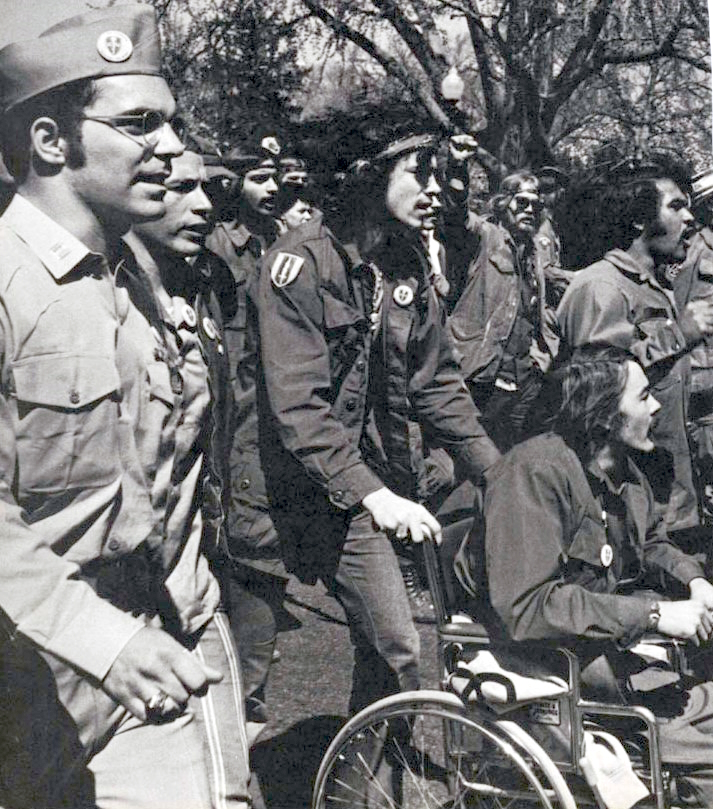
Vietnam Veterans Protest the War During Operation Dewey Canyon III

The medal throwing was the culminating event of six days of protests which started on April 18 as the first of over two thousand veterans arrived in Washington, DC. The whole six days came to be called Operation Dewey Canyon III by the veterans—a name intended to draw attention to two semi-secret U.S. and South Vietnamese military operations in Vietnam and Laos dubbed Dewey Canyon I & II. Using typical military jargon, the protesting vets termed Operation Dewey Canyon III, a "limited incursion into the country of Congress." The early days were filled with marches of hundreds of veterans, often led by men in wheelchairs and on crutches, wearing "a wild assortment of campaign ribbons, purple hearts, camouflage half uniforms, and jungle camouflage hats"; guerrilla theater on Capital Hill, where vets staged mock search-and-destroy missions showing how U.S. troops were ordered to kill everything that moved and demonstrating that the Mỹ Lai massacre was not an aberration; and lobbying of members of congress.

The lobbying efforts were an eye-opener for many veterans who hoped they would be listened to by the politicians. Instead they discovered many wouldn't even meet with them, saying things like "I know where you stand and you know where I stand. We're on opposite sides." One veteran was berated by his congressman who said, "You're a disgrace to the uniform! Get out of this office!" With few exceptions, the vets felt the politicians were unmoved and not about to change their positions. "The politicians sent us to Vietnam. Now they don't want to hear us," said one ex-Marine. Another vet concluded, it made us "more radical."

President Richard Nixon fed into this growing disillusionment and anger when he claimed that "only 30 percent of the people [protesting were] Vietnam veterans." The vets responded by collecting 1,200 DD-214s (military discharge papers) from the veterans in the camp and presenting them to the press. One veteran expressed all the protesters' sentiments when he said, "Only 30 percent of us believe Nixon is President." One of the highlights for the vets was attending a Senate hearing room to hear Senator George McGovern "call for an immediate end" to the war. They cheered as he denounced the crimes "involved in killing several hundred thousand innocent civilians by our massive firepower." And again as he compared the "crimes against humanity" being committed by the U.S. in Vietnam to those committed by German and Japanese forces in World War II.

== Medal Throwing ==
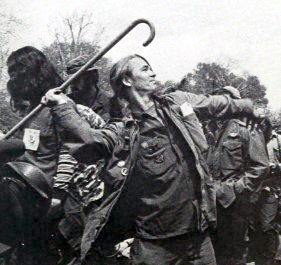
Hundreds of Vietnam veterans hurled their war medals, ribbons, discharge papers, and even a cane onto the U.S. Capitol Steps

The growing anger of the veterans helped them decide what to do on the last day of the demonstrations. As one vet explained, "I remember there was a big debate about whether we should throw the medals away at the Capitol Building or put them in a body bag." Some of the less radical vets felt it would be disrespectful to throw the medals away, but, as the debate continued, a fence was erected in front of the Capitol to keep the vets away. That was it, one of the vets shouted "Let's throw the medals over the goddammed fence." Another said, "We're making a statement that they can't ignore." The veterans were making a significant decision. As history professor Andrew E. Hunt put it, "In the military culture, citations, ribbons, and decorations assumed a significance that most civilians did not understand." Hunt quoted a vet explaining what his medals meant to him, "That was my thanks for Vietnam. That was my recognition. That was all the fuck I had for my sacrifices." Over time, however, the vet understood the medals were "tokens for something I wasn't proud of anymore." Another vet knew what they needed to do, "We were giving the finger to Congress."

The first veteran to step forward was Jack Smith, a 27 year old ex-Marine sergeant from Connecticut. He said he was casting his medals "away as symbols of shame, dishonor, and inhumanity." One by one, the veterans stepped up in front of the Capitol and hurled their anger over the fence. Many announced their name and military unit, and some threw medals for other vets who couldn't be present, including one vet who tossed "nine Purple Hearts, a Distinguished Service Cross, a Bronze Star, a Silver Star 'and a lot of other shit...for my brothers.'" One vet threw the artificial leg he had been issued by the military. Another tossed his Bronze Star saying, "I wish I could make them eat it!" Some were so overcome upon reaching the front of the line they couldn't speak or could only get out a few words like, "These ain't shit." Another yelled "Here are my merit badges for murder." A former Marine told the New York Times why he was throwing his medals away: he said he had been trained not to "trust the kids, don't trust the old women, they'll kill you." But, he went on, "It's the people's struggle against the aggressor, [and] we're the aggressor." One veteran, seemingly speaking for many of the others, pointed to the Capitol building and said, "We don't want to fight anymore, but if we have to fight again, it'll be to take these steps."

== Impact ==
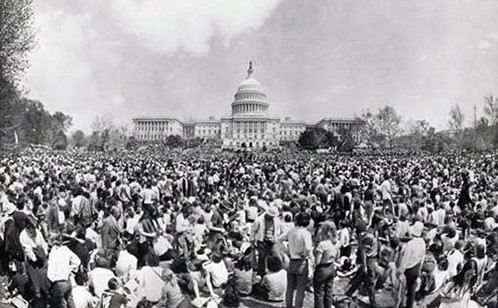
Anti-Vietnam War Demonstration in Washington, DC April 24, 1971

After the last veteran had thrown his medals, "fourteen Navy and Distinguished Service Crosses, one hundred Silver Stars, and more than a thousand Purple Hearts lay on the ground." Many of the veterans felt immense relief. It "was the defining moment of my life" recalled a vet from Kansas. Several vets embraced each other and wept. More, the larger antiwar movement was profoundly impacted and energized. Antiwar leader Sid Peck said the veterans' actions had "set the whole tone" for the demonstrations that followed. The very next day, Saturday April 24, 1971, one of the largest antiwar demonstrations in U.S. history took place as half a million marched in Washington, D.C. and a quarter million in San Francisco. Even with these massive mobilizations, it was clear the veterans had struck a deeper chord. A Pennsylvania newspaper said the "appearance of 900 warriors for peace" will more "influence the thinking of the nation". During the days of actions, the nightly network news broadcasts often "began with footage of the veterans' protests." The Plain Dealer in Cleveland called the veterans' protests "deeply impressive." The Philadelphia Daily News agreed saying the "opinions of those who have fought that war should carry special weight." The New York Times called the medal throwing "the most emotional" of the demonstrations, the "highlight of the week", with "an impact far greater than its numbers."

The demonstration was denounced by the Nixon White House and its supporters, such as Senate Minority Leader Hugh Scott and Commander Herbert B. Rainwater of the Veterans of Foreign Wars. White House Chief of Staff H. R. Haldeman recorded the following in his diary after emerging from an April 23, 1971 meeting with President Nixon:

We got into quite a discussion of the media problem. They’re really killing us because they run the veterans demonstration every night in great detail, and we have no way to fight back. It's a tough one, and we've been trying to figure out some ways of getting back at it....we're getting pretty well chopped up.

White House records indicate that the demonstrations so concerned Nixon and his advisors that they "began looking around for other Vietnam veterans who could counter" the antiwar message. They settled on John O'Neill who belonged to a small conservative group called Vietnam Veterans for a Just Peace. With Nixon's encouragement, O’Neill held a press conference in June 1971 where he asked, should a "little group of one thousand or twelve thousand embittered men be allowed to represent their views as that of all veterans, because they can appear on every news program? I hope not, for the country’s sake."

John Kerry participated in the protest, throwing his ribbons but not his medals. The incident resurfaced during the controversy over his military service that accompanied his 2004 presidential campaign.

== See also ==
- Concerned Officers Movement
- Movement for a Democratic Military
- Opposition to United States involvement in the Vietnam War
- Sir! No Sir!, documentary about the anti-war movement within the ranks of the United States Armed Forces
- Winter Soldier Investigation - Veterans testifying about war crimes in Vietnam
