= Mount Morris Ascension Presbyterian Church =

Church in Manhattan, New York

Coordinates: 40.80507°N 73.94552°W

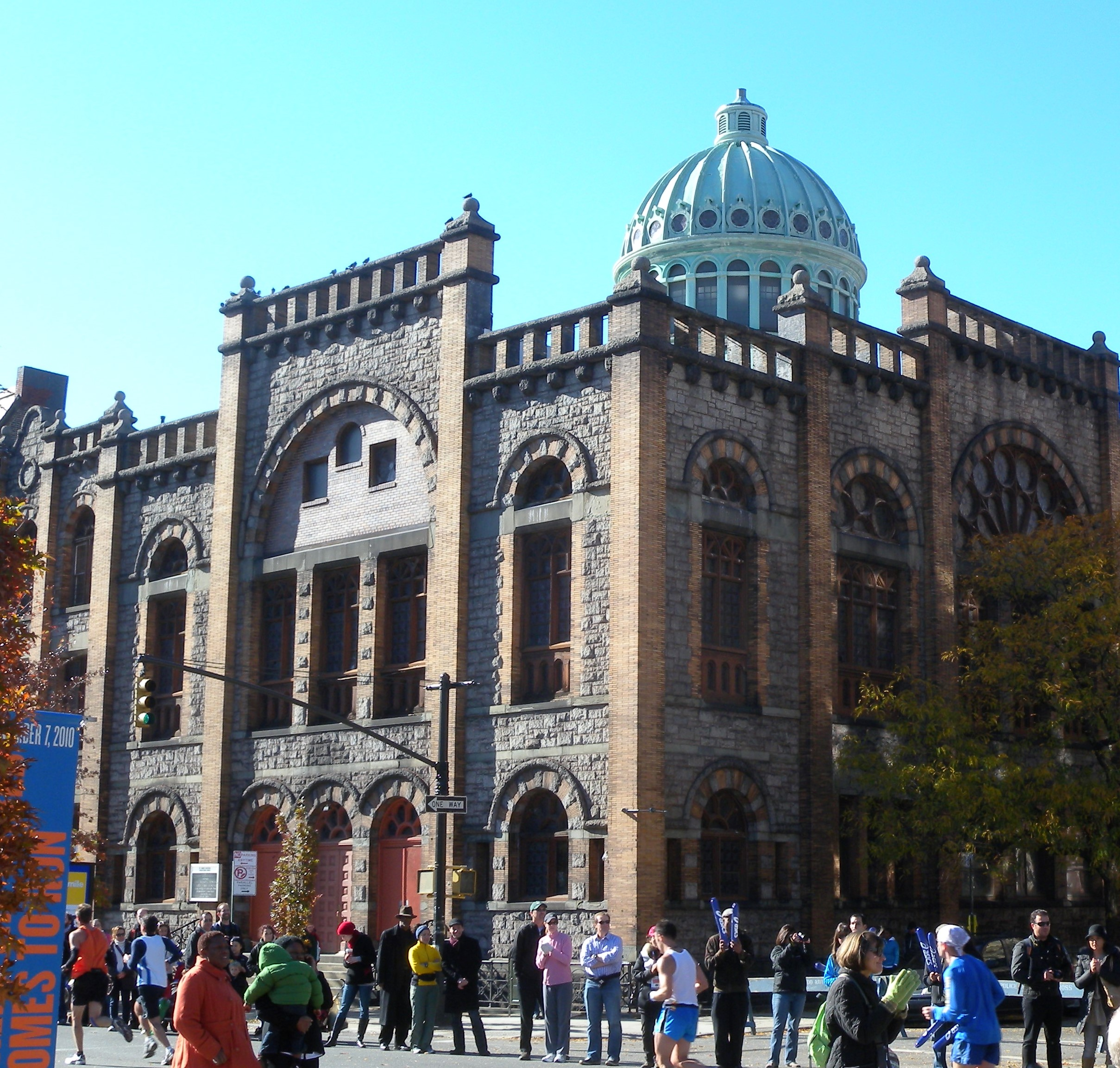

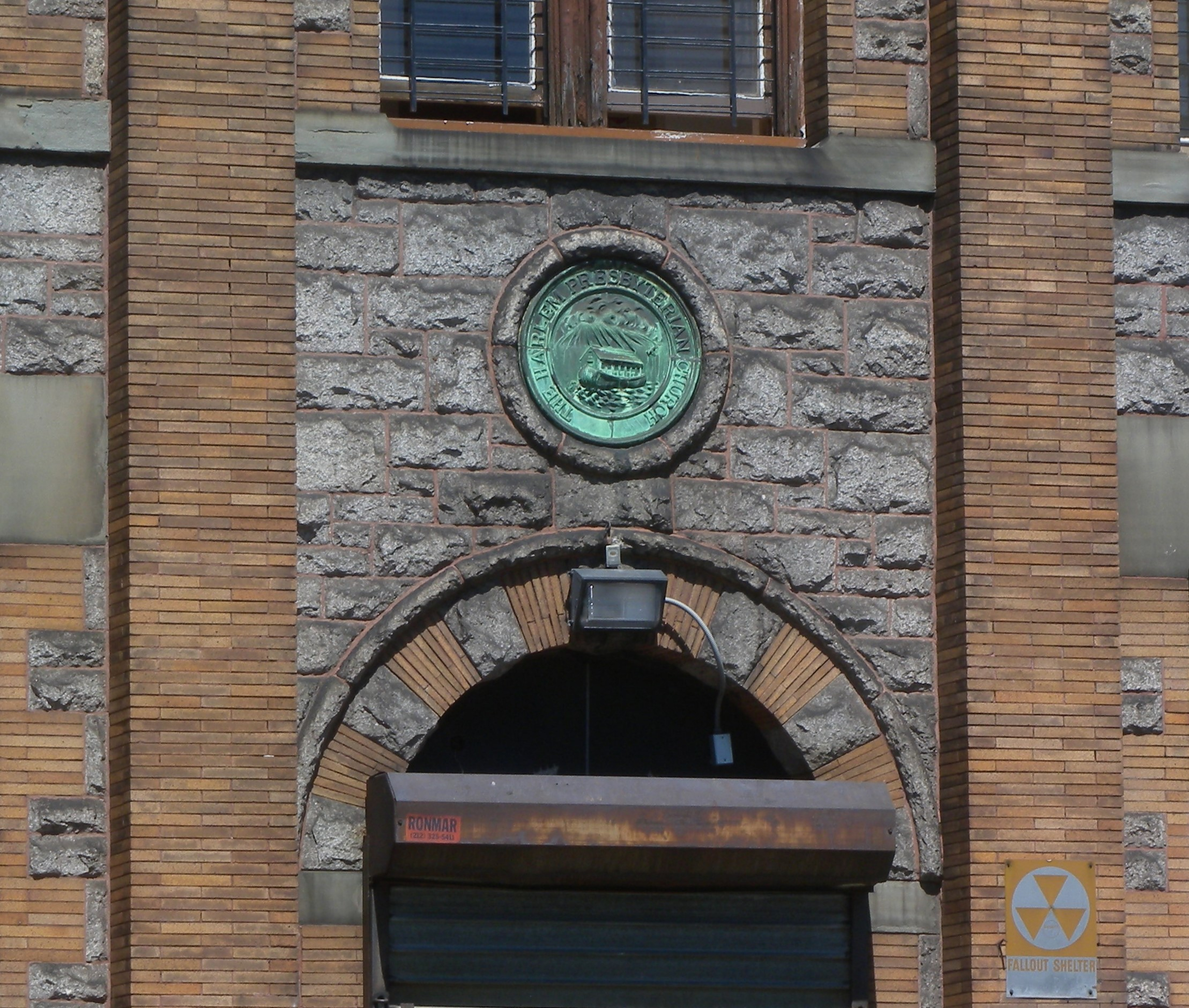
Patinaed Harlem Presbyterian Church medallion with a relief of Noah's Ark above doorway

Mount Morris Ascension Presbyterian Church, originally the Harlem Presbyterian Church, is a historic 1906 church in the Harlem section of New York City.

It was designed by Thomas Henry Poole as the Mount Morris Presbyterian Church and features granite and gold Roman brick. The church is in the Mount Morris Park Historic District.

The Harlem Presbyterian Church congregation was organized in the 1840s. A history of the Mount Morris Ascension Presbyterian Church was published in 1988. It is held by the New York Public Library.

It is at West 122nd Street and Mount Morris Park West. It has a copper clad dome and a medallion of Noah's Ark above its doorway. An American Institute of Architects guidebook describes the dome above the building's eclectic architecture as "just silly".

== See also ==
- Thelma C. Davidson Adair
