= Burn Baby Burn (poem) =

Poem by Marvin X

"Burn Baby Burn" is a poem by American poet Marvin X. X wrote the poem shortly after the Watts Rebellion in 1965 to convey the oppression black people face in white America.
