= Progressive Labor Party (United States) =

Communist political party

- Abbreviation: PLP
- Founded: January 1962; 64 years ago
- Headquarters: Brooklyn, New York
- Newspaper: Challenge
- Ideology: Communism; Marxism–Leninism; Anti-revisionism
- Political position: Far-left
- Colors: Red

Website
- www.plp.org

The Progressive Labor Party (PLP) is an anti-revisionist Marxist–Leninist communist party in the United States. It was established in January 1962 as the Progressive Labor Movement following a split in the Communist Party USA, adopting its new name at a convention held in the spring of 1965. It was involved in the anti-Vietnam War movement of the 1960s and early 1970s through its Worker Student Alliance faction of Students for a Democratic Society.

The PLP publishes a fortnightly newspaper, Challenge.

== History ==
=== Establishment ===
Former CPUSA Buffalo District Organizer Milton Rosen was the primary founder of the Progressive Labor Party

The PLP began as an organized faction called the Progressive Labor Movement in January 1962. It was formed in the aftermath of a fall 1961 split in the Communist Party of the United States (CPUSA) that saw the expulsion of left-wing labor activists Milton Rosen (1926–2011) and Mortimer Scheer. Before his expulsion, Rosen was a prominent CPUSA functionary, serving as District Organizer for upstate New York from 1957 and Industrial Organizer for all of New York state from 1959. An initial organizational meeting was held in December 1961, attended by 12 of the approximately 50 current and former CPUSA members identifying themselves as the "Call group". Rosen delivered a political report to the Cuban Revolution-inspired group urging the establishment of a new communist party in the United States to replace the CPUSA, which was characterized as irredeemably revisionist.

The organization remained amorphous in its first months, publishing Progressive Labor—initially a monthly newsletter—and engaging in small-scale discussions. An organizational conference was called by the editors of Progressive Labor to be held in New York City in July 1962. This gathering, held at the Hotel Diplomat, was attended by 50 people from 11 different cities and served to launch a formal organization, the Progressive Labor Movement. Rosen again delivered the main political report to the gathering, calling for the writing of a program and development of a network of clubs and affiliated mass organizations in order to win supporters for a new revolutionary socialist movement. Given the small size of the fledgling organization, formation of a political party was deemed unpropitious. The name "Progressive Labor Movement" was selected to emphasize the organization's early and transitional nature. The Progressive Labor Movement was finally reconstituted as the Progressive Labor Party at a founding convention held in New York City on April 15–18, 1965. A 20-member National Committee was elected, and Rosen became the party's founding chair. Organizational headquarters were established in New York City.

=== 1960s ===
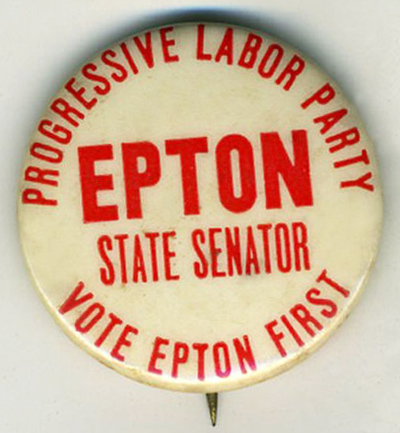
The PLP made periodic forays into electoral politics, including a run of Bill Epton for New York State Senate in 1965

Although it disdains parliamentarism as an end, the Progressive Labor Movement was quick to make use of the electoral process as a vehicle for propaganda, launching an effort to gain the signatures of 5,000 registered voters in New York City to put a PLP candidate on the ballot for the November 1963 election of the New York City Council. Although it did not manage to place its candidate on the ballot, the proto-PLP distributed more than 100,000 pieces of party literature in conjunction with the electoral campaign.

The PLP remained of modest size throughout the decade. It had more than 600 members in 1965. It did not publicize its membership, but federal income tax returns filed in 1967 and 1968 provide a reasonable proxy. The PLP formally existed as a publishing partnership listing Milt Rosen and the party's 1965 candidate for New York State Senate, Bill Epton, as partners. These returns showed income and expenditures of about $66,000 in 1967 and about $88,600 in 1968, with the partners claiming no income from the ostensible business relationship.

During the 1960s, the PLP followed the international political line of the Chinese Communist Party and was described by commentators as "Maoist". It favored the Chinese perspective on the Sino-Soviet split. The organization carved out a niche in the anti-Vietnam War movement, with its Worker Student Alliance faction acting as rivals to the Revolutionary Youth Movement faction within Students for a Democratic Society, a part of which (RYM 1) later evolved into the Weather Underground.

The PLP made extensive use of mass organizations (front groups) from its earliest years, through which it spread its ideas, raised funds and recruited new members. Among these were the Student Committee for Travel to Cuba (1963–64), which organized travel to post-revolutionary Cuba; the Harlem Defense Council (1964), organized in response to racially oriented rioting in Harlem; the May 2nd Movement (M2M, established 1964), organized in opposition to the Vietnam War; and other short-lived, issue-driven front groups.

Early in its existence, PLP viewed black workers as the "key revolutionary force".

=== 1970s ===
The PLP ended its previous political line supporting the Cultural Revolution and broke with the People's Republic of China in the spring of 1971 with the publication of an internal discussion bulletin for party members detailing eight points of disagreement with the Chinese regime. These related to the softening of China's foreign relations towards Cambodia, North Korea, Romania, Yugoslavia, and the United States, its "complete elevation of the Black Panther Party as the revolutionary group in the United States" and its "total collusion with every nationalist fake the world over, from Nasser to Nkrumah".

During the 1970s, the PLP began to shape its activity around racism in the United States, forming a mass organization called the Committee Against Racism (CAR). A CAR convention held in New York City in July 1976 drew 500 participants. The organization made use of aggressive direct action tactics against its perceived opponents, disrupting presentations by the controversial psychologist Arthur Jensen and the physicist William Shockley in the spring of 1976. In 1977, the organization, now renamed the International Committee Against Racism (InCAR), made headlines by disrupting an academic conference by pouring a pitcher of water on Wilson's head while chanting "Wilson, you're all wet".

=== Structure ===
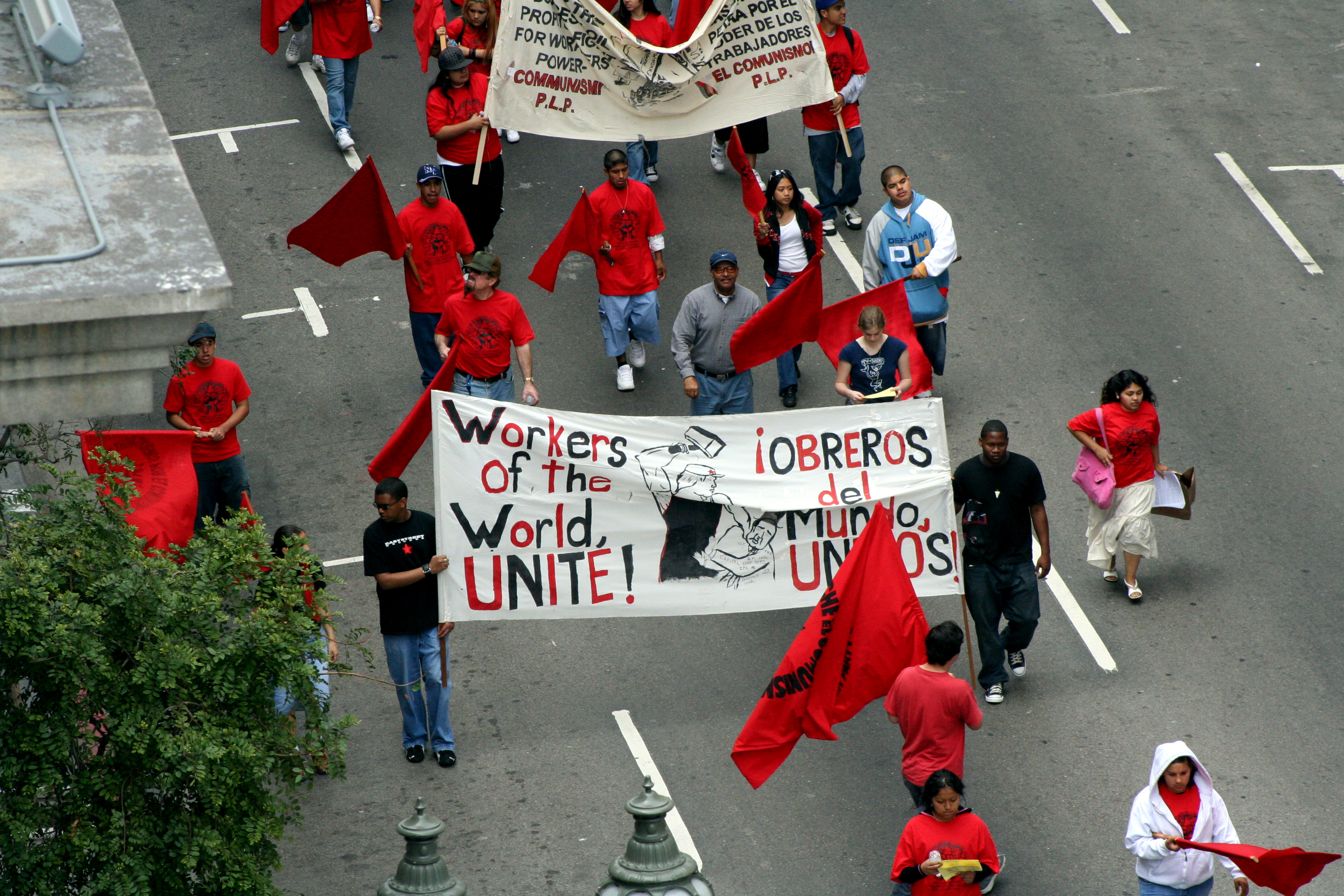
PLP members in 2006

According to the constitution adopted at the time of the PLP's formation in 1965, membership was open to anyone at least 17 years old who accepted the program and policies of the party, paid dues and required assessments and subscribed to party publications. Supreme authority within the organization was to be exerted by national conventions, held every two years. The convention was to elect a National Committee to handle matters of governance between conventions. The PLP's primary party unit was the "club", organized either on a shop, territorial, or functional basis. All party members were required to be active members of a club and bound by the principles of democratic centralism, in which decisions of higher bodies were considered binding on participants in lower bodies. During the 1960s, new members were additionally required to undergo three months of ideological training, usually in small group settings in individual houses.

Owing in part to the significant economic and extensive time requirements expected of its members, the PLP has since its inception been a small cadre organization, with an "estimated hard-core membership" of about 350 in 1970, supplemented by numerous sympathizers. Members during the 1960s were predominantly from white, middle-class backgrounds, shunned drug use, and tended "to dress neatly and wear short hair", according to a 1971 House Internal Security Committee staff report.

=== Publications ===
During the 1960s and 1970s, the PLP published a magazine called Progressive Labor, which first appeared as a monthly before shifting to quarterly and later bimonthly publication. The press run of Progressive Labor circa 1970 was approximately 10,000. The party also published Challenge, a publication likewise issued at changing intervals over the years. In 1970, the press run of this publication was approximately 75,000, according to the estimates of government investigators, with many of these copies unsold.

Challenge remains in production today as a biweekly, issued under the same covers with its parallel Spanish language counterpart Desafío. The PLP also produces a semiannual theoretical magazine, The Communist.

During 1963 and 1964, the PLP also produced a theoretical magazine called Marxist-Leninist Quarterly. This publication was terminated and merged with Progressive Labor magazine in 1965. A West Coast publication called Spark was also produced from 1965 until early 1968.

=== Music ===
In 1972, the PLP released a music album called Power to the Working Class, produced and performed entirely by PLP members. Half of the songs featured are folk songs; the rest are rock songs. Few of them discuss the PLP itself, instead promoting solidarity among the working class and the PLP's general ideals. R. Michael Kaus, in a review for The Harvard Crimson, praised the album for committing to a political stance, though he felt its over-arching message was vague and ill-defined.

== See also ==
- List of anti-revisionist groups

== Historic PLP publications ==
- Bill Epton, The Black Liberation Struggle (Within The Current World Struggle). Speech at Old Westbury College, February 26, 1976. Harlem: Black Liberation Press, 1976.
- Bill Epton, We Accuse: Bill Epton Speaks to the Court. New York: Progressive Labor Party, 1966.
- Harlem Defense Council, Police Terror In Harlem. NY: Harlem Defense Council, n.d. [1964?].
- [Wendy Nakashima], Organize! Use Wendy Nakashima's campaign for assembly (69 a.d.) to fight back!. Progressive Labor Party, New York. [1966].
- Progressive Labor Movement, Road to Revolution: The Outlook of the Progressive Labor Movement. Brooklyn: Progressive Labor Movement, 1964.
- Progressive Labor Party, Notes on Black Liberation. New York: Black Liberation Commission, Progressive Labor Party, 1965.
- Progressive Labor Party, Smash the Bosses' Armed Forces. A Fighting Program for GIs.. Brooklyn, NY: Progressive Labor Party, n.d. [1969?].
- Progressive Labor Party, Revolution Today, USA: A Look at the Progressive Labor Movement and the Progressive Labor Party. New York: Exposition Press, 1970.
