= Criminal anarchy =

Federal crime

In the United States, criminal anarchy is the crime of conspiracy to overthrow the government by force or violence, or by assassination of the executive head or of any of the executive officials of government, or by any unlawful means. The advocacy of such doctrine either by word of mouth or writing is a felony in many U.S. states. Circa 1955, the United States Solicitor General said that forty-two States plus Alaska and Hawaii had statutes which in some form prohibited advocacy of the violent overthrow of established government.

== Legislation ==
=== Federal ===
At the federal level, criminal anarchy is criminalized by 18 U.S.C. § 2385, which makes it an offense punishable by 20 years' imprisonment to advocate the overthrow of the U.S. government. Violation of this statute can also result in losing one's U.S. citizenship. The Constitutionality of these statutes at the present time is highly questionable. In 1925, criminal anarchy statutes were ruled constitutional in the U.S. Supreme Court case of Gitlow v. New York, 268 U.S. 652 (1925). However, in 1969, the subsequent U.S. Supreme Court decision of Brandenburg v. Ohio, 395 U.S. 444 (1969) overturned nearly all criminalization of political speech, including advocacy of the violent overthrow of the government, unless such speech "is directed to inciting or producing imminent lawless action and is likely to incite or produce such action."

=== State ===
At the state level, the remaining criminal anarchy statutes (in 2013) are:

- Arkansas ("Ar. Code § 5-51-202".)
- Colorado ("C.R.S. 18-11-201".) (Note: Called "sedition")
- Massachusetts ("Ma. Gen. L. ch. 264 § 11".)
- Mississippi ("Miss. Code § 97-7-71".)
- New York ("C.L.N.Y. 240.15".)
- Nevada ("N.S.C. 203.115".)
- Florida ("F.S. 876.01".to "876.03".) (Note: Through these dispositions refer to the doctrines of "criminal anarchy", "criminal Communism", "criminal Naziism [sic]" or "criminal Fascism", these statutes are still criminal anarchy statutes.)
- Illinois ("720 ILCS 5/30‑3".)
- Louisiana ("R.S. 14:115".)
- Texas ("Tex. Code 557.001(a) (2) and (3)".)
- Vermont ("13 V.S.A. § 3405".)
- Washington ("RCW 9.81.020".)
- Wisconsin ("Wi. Stat § 946.03".)

Moreover:

- California, Kansas and Ohio forbid parties advocating criminal anarchy from being recognised or qualified for the ballot.
- In New Jersey convictions incurred for "anarchy" cannot be expunged.
- Georgia law defines "subversive organisations" and "persons" (ie. organisations or persons advocating and/or engaging in acts aiming to overthrowing the government), mandating the dissolution of the former and making the latter ineligible to hold political offices.

== See also ==
- Anarchism and violence
- Criminal syndicalism
- Seditious speech in the United States
- Illegalism
