= 1965 March against the Vietnam War =

The 1965 March against the Vietnam War was an anti-Vietnam War protest that took place in Washington, D.C., on 17 April 1965.

== History ==
The student activist group Students for a Democratic Society (SDS) held its first anti-Vietnam War protest rally in Washington, DC. It was co-sponsored by Women's Strike for Peace. 12,000-20,000 attended, including Joan Baez, Judy Collins, and Phil Ochs. The host was I. F. Stone.

Senator Ernest Gruening of Alaska, a World War I veteran and one of the two senators who voted against the Tonkin Gulf Resolution that gave credence to the direct combat role of the U.S. in the Vietnam War and allowed bombing of Vietnam without prior Congressional approval, spoke.

After the speeches and music the crowd started to move toward the Capitol, down the National Mall from the Washington Monument. Baez and others intercepted the impromptu march.

== See also ==
- United States in the Vietnam War
