= 1960s Berkeley protests =

Student-led protests

The 1960s Berkeley protests occurred at the University of California, Berkeley, and Berkeley, California. Many of these protests were a small part of the larger Free Speech Movement, which had national implications and constituted the onset of the counterculture of the 1960s. These protests were headed under the informal leadership of students Mario Savio, Jack Weinberg, Brian Turner, Bettina Aptheker, Steve Weissman, Art Goldberg, Jackie Goldberg, and others.

== Overview ==
The events at Berkeley can be generally defined by three single yet interrelated social topics: the Civil Rights Movement, the Free Speech Movement, and the Vietnam war protests in Berkeley, California.

The Berkeley protests were not the first demonstrations to be held in and around the University of California Campus. Since before World War II, students had demonstrated at the university. In the 1930s, the students at Berkeley led massive demonstrations protesting the United States ending its disarmament policy and the approaching war. Throughout the course of World War II, these demonstrations continued with the addition of strikes against fascism; however, they were largely symbolic in form. This can be inferred, as the student groups leading these demonstrations did not necessarily seek, nor did they expect, their demonstrations to result in change. Nevertheless, this passive approach to demonstration changed in the 1950s at the height of the McCarthy era. From 1949 to 1950, students and teaching assistants at UC Berkeley rallied against the anti-communist loyalty oath that professors were forced to take at the university. Until the Berkeley riots, these demonstrations were the largest student protests witnessed in the United States. Considering the relatively high presence of demonstrations on the Berkeley campus in its history, and the fact that it had already been the site of the largest student demonstration in the United States, it provided a perfect site to nurture the Berkeley riots.

== Events ==
The Berkeley protests ultimately occurred in and around the University of California Berkeley Campus.

=== Sheraton Palace Demonstration ===
The Sheraton Palace Demonstration was essentially the first event. The protests were in response to the racially discriminatory hiring practices used by the hotel. The protesters sought equal hiring practices, and for the hotel to have black individuals in executive positions. Approximately 4000 people were involved with the protest and occupation of the hotel. Although the demonstration was organized by the Ad Hoc Committee to End Discrimination , a high percentage of individuals involved in the protest were members of the student population of the Berkeley campus.

=== Free Speech Movement ===
==== Ban of tables on Bancroft and Telegraph ====
The UC Berkeley administration believed that on-campus political advocacy was partially responsible for the high percentage of student involvement in the widely publicized Sheraton Palace demonstration. In response to such student political activity, on September 16, 1964, Dean of Students Katherine Towle released a letter stating that political organizing was no longer permitted on the corner of Bancroft and Telegraph. That intersection had served for years as a gathering place for students to hand out pamphlets and organize for political causes. In protest, members of the campus chapter of the Congress of Racial Equality (CORE), a leading civil rights group, set up a table with literature in front of Sproul Hall.

==== Arrest of Jack Weinberg ====
On Thursday October 1, 1964, Jack Weinberg, the chairman of Campus CORE, was sitting at the CORE table in front of Sproul Hall and was arrested for violating the University's new rules regarding student political activism. Before the police car containing Weinberg could leave the plaza, students around the car sat down, preventing it from leaving. Throughout the night and into the next day, students, including Mario Savio, gave speeches from atop the car calling for free speech on campus. During that time, as many as 7000 people (mostly students) congregated in the plaza watching the spectacle and listening to the speeches. On the evening of October 2, 1964, approximately twenty-four hours later, representatives of political groups on campus signed an agreement with the administration regarding student free speech, which was dubbed the Pact of October 2.

==== Occupation of Sproul Hall ====
The student occupation of Sproul Hall on December 2, 1964, was the largest single demonstration organized by the Free Speech Movement. The demonstration was in response to the proposed expulsion of Jack Weinberg and other members of the Free Speech Movement and other student political groups for their involvement in the recent protests on the Berkeley campus, as well as for the University's refusal to drop charges against student political group leaders. The initial plan was to occupy the hall for a single night; however, the protesters were prepared for a two- to three-day demonstration and siege of Sproul Hall. Ultimately, 1500 students occupied Sproul Hall before being removed by police. In all, 773 student activists were arrested for their involvement in this event.

=== Vietnam Day march ===
The Vietnam Day Committee was formed on May 22, 1965, during a two-day-long protest of the Vietnam War on the Berkeley campus, with the ultimate goal of organizing a large-scale march against the war at a later date. After several failed attempts due to blockades by police and the National Guard, the Vietnam day committee was able to organize a march on November 21, 1965 through the streets of Oakland, California. With over 10,000 participants, it was the first large-scale demonstration of negative public opinion of the Vietnam War.

=== Other notable events ===
- March down Telegraph Avenue - October 15, 1965 Berkeley, CA
- March on Oakland Army Terminal - November 1965 Berkeley & Oakland, CA
- Stop the Draft Week - October 1967 Oakland, CA
- Third World Liberation Front Strikes of 1968

== Organizations ==
=== Vietnam Day Committee ===
The Vietnam Day Committee (VDC) was a coalition of left-wing political groups, student groups, labor organizations, and pacifist religions in the United States of America that opposed the Vietnam War. It was formed in Berkeley, California, in the spring of 1965 by activist Jerry Rubin, and was active through the majority of the Vietnam war, organizing several rallies and marches in California as well as coordinating and sponsoring nationwide protests.

=== SLATE ===
Stemming from TASC (Towards an Active Student Community), SLATE was the main "New Left" student group for the Berkeley campus throughout the 1950s and 1960s. Founded in February 1958, the SLATE Coordinating Committee aimed to promote students running for the Associated Students of University of California (ASUC) who were committed to engage in issue-oriented political education both on and off campus. SLATE was involved with both on-and off-campus issues such as "fair bear" minimum wages for students and affordable housing for students. SLATE led protests against compulsory ROTC, demonstrations against the death penalty, protests against the California House Un-American Activities Committee (HUAC), and protests against racial discrimination.

=== CORE ===
The Congress of Racial Equality (CORE) is a U.S. civil rights organization that played a pivotal role in the Civil Rights Movement from its foundation in 1942 to the mid-1960s. Membership in CORE is stated to be open to "anyone who believes that 'all people are created equal' and is willing to work towards the ultimate goal of true equality throughout the world." From 1968 until his death in 2017, CORE was led by Roy Innis.

== Movements ==
=== Free speech ===
The Free Speech Movement (FSM) was a student protest which took place during the 1964–1965 academic year on the campus of the University of California, Berkeley under the informal leadership of students Mario Savio, Jack Weinberg, Brian Turner, Bettina Apthecker, Steve Weissman, Art Goldberg, Jackie Goldberg, and others. In protests unprecedented at the time, students insisted that the university administration lift a ban on on-campus political activities and acknowledge the students' right to free speech and academic freedom.

=== Anti-war ===
The idea was that if enough Americans believed the war was wrong, they could end it. This was the central driving goal of the movement as a whole. Through marches, protests, and riots the protesters aimed to bring awareness to injustices happening in the war with hopes to end it permanently. Common events were protests around the drafting/induction centers and marches through town, which were often accompanied by speeches against the war in Vietnam. These protests were often met with police force in full riot gear which in turn sparked more angry riots. At one point the National Guard was called in to assist the local police force in riot control. Tear gas was used to control the crowds and left a haze of gas over the campus for days at a time. Classes were canceled, or sometimes held in off-campus sites including students' apartments.

=== Women's rights ===
As women became more involved in the inner workings of the Berkeley protests, they began to move up in the ranks of the positions as well. However, as time progressed they began to face opposition, even from their peers. An organization based upon promoting the advancement of human rights was now rejecting women the opportunity to lead. This created a new branch of advancement for the Women's Rights Movement.

== Influences ==
=== Antinomianism ===
Traditionally, antinomianism has been used to refer to the idea that members of a Christian religious group are under no obligation to obey the laws of ethics or morality as presented by religious authorities. However, a few scholars began to use the term in a secular context.

During this era, many people were influenced by the "antinomian personality", a behavioral style which "places characteristic emphasis on intuition, immediacy, self-actualization, transcendence, and similar themes familiar with Hippie conduct," said Lawrence Chenoweth. He said that those settled into this psychological state embrace the present, while rejecting the past and "fearing" the future. Chenoweth claims that the antinomian takes on a holistic attitude which results from the "confusion as to whether he is an agent or an agent to be acted upon and serves to compensate for the isolation he suffers." The antinomian often confronts "forces which make the individual aware of his impotence." Chenoweth says that all of these traits then combine into the stereotypical hippie persona, as the antinomian "treats his mind as if it were completely malleable, devalues reality, rejects reason and understanding, and selects certain experiences to create a fantasied, dogmatic cosmic view of the world." In doing so, says Nathan Adler, "the individual internalizes an objective world which he perceives to be reliable and consistent." As the individual now views the world in this fashion, he or she is easily agitated when the outside world deviates from his or her ideal and seeks to control its movements.

=== Black Panther Party ===
The Black Panther Party, founded by Bobby Seale and Huey P. Newton in late 1966, aimed to improve civil rights of African Americans and to rid police brutality against African Americans, especially in the Oakland area. Through their Ten Point Program, the Black Panthers were able to establish a foundation for their organization as a whole. The Black Panther Party used the technique of social agitation, in the form of vigilantism, their survival programs, and more broadly their resistance to accept and conform to influence the Civil Rights Movement.

Their organization and establishment inspired the Berkeley students, and led to cohesion between the two groups. The event epitomizing this cohesion was the Sheraton Palace demonstration, in San Francisco, California. The Berkeley Students involved in the various student groups (I.E. SLATE & CORE) and the members of the Black Panther Party united to protest outside the hotel while meetings between the administration board were being conducted inside. The goal of the protest was to advance the job opportunities of African Americans within the hotel through the use of social agitation. The protest proved successful, as the Hotel eventually signed an agreement allowing African Americans opportunities to not only advance but also to be hired into managerial positions.

=== SNCC ===
The Student Nonviolent Coordinating Committee (SNCC) was one of the principal organizations of the American Civil Rights Movement in the 1960s. There is evidence that many of the students involved in the Berkeley protests acquired their spirit of dissent and learned techniques of civil disobedience through prior involvement in civil rights groups.

=== Music ===
Many of the musicians during this era contributed widespread influence on the young people. This led to a young counterculture that questioned authority and its ability to set boundaries around them.

== See also ==
- 1969 People's Park protest
- List of incidents of civil unrest in the United States
- 2017 Berkeley protests
