= Alliance of Libertarian Activists =

Former student organization

Alliance of Libertarian Activists (ALA) was a libertarian student organization primarily located in the San Francisco Bay area, mostly active at University of California, Berkeley, established in 1965–1966, and considered the first campus group to adopt the term libertarian. ALA gained members from both the purged Young Americans for Freedom (YAF) Moïse Tshombe chapter and the Cal Conservatives for Political Action (CCPA) at UC Berkeley, which was a continuation of the 1964 Cal Students for Goldwater, both founded and first chaired by Dan Rosenthal.

== Activities and ideals ==
The ALA promoted the common goals of "psychedelic and sexual freedom, an uncensored press, freedom of travel, and a non-aggressive foreign policy." They had a rented headquarters, participated in sit-ins, anti-draft demonstrations, and engaged in the Free Speech Movement (FSM) and were later heavily involved in the Filthy Speech Movement.

The ALA engaged the New Left on issues of civil rights, promoted sexual freedom, arranged radio programs that focused on libertarian philosophy, counter-picketed San Francisco Bay Area anti-Vietnam demonstrations until they became "explicitly 'anti-imperialistic,'" passed resolutions against and picketed the John Birch Society offices, opposed the draft and the compulsory nature of Social Security, railed against laws banning LSD and marijuana, and supported the constitutional rights of native Americans.

== Free Speech and Filthy Speech Movement ==
Dan Rosenthal, a mathematics graduate student attending Berkeley, was the primary focal point for various contingents of conservative and libertarian student organizations and activities, including the supportive role in Moïse Tshombe YAF chapter and Cal Conservatives for Political Action in the 1964 Free Speech Movement (FSM), and later filthy speech movement. Since the administrators at Berkeley had banned political tables and literature on campus, conservative and libertarian students became early supporters of free speech in the battle over censorship. In 1964 Rosenthal was arrested for his participation in the free speech movement at UC Berkeley, which radicalized his girlfriend Sharon Presley. According to economist Murray Rothbard, Rosenthal had "exerted considerable influence on the views of Mario Savio," who became a key member in the FSM movement.

In early March 1965, Rosenthal was arrested by campus police for the misdemeanor charge of mouthing obscenities in public, along with others. A little earlier, he had defended John J. Thompson, a big fan of comic Lenny Bruce, whose speech at Berkeley's student union was deemed obscene, although Thompson never uttered any four-letter obscenities. In solidarity, Rosenthal proclaimed to a crowd of 150 that he would soon order a thousand "F... Communism" signs for the CCPA literature table. Later, the ALA scheduled a talk and discussion at UC Berkeley entitled, "F... Communism, A Right-wing Case for Sexual Freedom."

Many of the participating students, including Rosenthal's CCPA cadres, were attempting to expand free speech protection beyond political speech to include obscene speech, causing an incident that The Daily Cal coined the "Filthy Speech Movement." The judicial maneuvering lasted a year. In 1966 the U.S. Supreme Court refused to stay the prison sentence of Rosenthal and eight other demonstrators for terms up to 10 to 60 days. Rosenthal drew 15 days in jail.

In November 1966, the CCPA voiced opposition to Chancellor Roger Heyns' proposal to relocate future political rallies away from the famous FSM Sproul Hall steps to a less prominent area. Referring to himself as "radical conservative," Rosenthal remarked that "I can't help but see this intolerance of radical, left-wing activity on campus as one and the same part of the liberal establishment's general hostility to radically divergent views." In front of 5,000 students, Mario Savio, Dan Rosenthal and Bettina Aptheker spoke against the proposed site change.

== The Conversion ==
The ideology of CCPA leaders and members was slipping away from traditional values. They could no longer work with conservatives because "their goals were too different and similarities too superficial." By 1966 the charter for the Moise Tshombe YAF chapter was pulled by national YAF because of its support for the legalization of drugs and prostitution, which made them the "first libertarian deviationists from YAF." The Moise Tshombe YAF chapter was also purged, according to Rosenthal, for picketing the San Jose headquarters of the John Birch Society, carrying signs that read: "Buckley si, Welch no." The picketing caused Paul Nichols, a member of the Berkeley Birch Society, to accuse the CCPA of being part of Berkeley's radical atmosphere and that "The CCPA is not really conservative."

One of the crucial issues that drove the CCPA towards an explicitly libertarian direction arose over philosophical conflicts concerning the morality of the Vietnam War. CCPA leaders, including Sharon Presley, quickly saw the philosophical inconsistencies in supporting both individual liberty and an unjustified foreign war. Anti-war Leftists on campus asked CCPA leaders "how they could oppose government interference in the lives of Americans, while simultaneously demanding government interference in foreign lands?"

Cal Conservatives and the ALA began to cooperate with leftwing organizations, including Students for a Democratic Society (SDS) to oppose the draft, working together in sponsoring an anti-draft rally in front of Sproul Hall in early 1966. The ALA set up an anti-draft organization called Students Opposed to Conscription, picketed the Oakland induction center while Rosenthal engaged in a 10-day hunger strike at the Berkeley draft board office, calling the draft the "Selective Slavery System." By 1967 some leaders of ALA, including Sharon Presley, "identified as an anarchist," or at least took a favorable view towards individual anarchism. One member, Tom Jacobsen, reported to the Berkeley Barb, that their group was "libertarian conservative" which is "basically non-collectivist, but the membership ranges from traditional conservatives to near-anarchists."

In the fall of 1966, the ALA sponsored a speech by Dr. Richard Alpert (Ram Dass), a close colleague of Timothy Leary, in an attempt to comingle left with right. At the time, ALA put out a statement in support of a left–right convergence.

On the Right we appeal to limited-government libertarians, Students of Objectivism, individualist anarchists, autarchists and neo-classical liberals, among others; on the Left we appeal to voluntary communalists, voluntary syndicalists, psychedelic libertarians, etc. The conventional labels of leftist and rightist are all but obsolete. The real issue is this: will economic, social and political arrangements of whatever form be made by voluntary or coercive means?

The ALA launched a campaign to challenge mandatory Associated Student fees, circulating petitions to make the AS fee voluntary. Sharon Presley wrote a column in the San Francisco State College's The Daily Gater, stating:

As a matter of principle, we in the Alliance of Libertarian Activists believe that individuals should never be forced into paying for anything whether they want it or not. That is the way of coercivists, not libertarians. But on a practical level, voluntary AS fees would be a meaningful boon to students.

The ALA published The Libertarian Iconoclast in the mid to late 1960s. They issued a strict anti-interventionist declaration that focused on domestic and foreign policies, prescribed in their 1966 "Berkeley Statement," along with language that spoke in negative terms in what governments must not do, considered as a pioneering approach that was launched to pacify both minarchists and anarcho-capitalist libertarians.

== Later years ==
A number of California YAF leaders, including Dana Rohrabacher and William "Shawn" Steel, visited the ALA headquarters and the leaders from the purged Moïse Tshombe YAF chapter. The encounter introduced them to the libertarian and individualist anarchist philosophy, which helped facilitate the traditionalist and libertarian split at the 1969 YAF national convention, marking the first libertarian break with conservatism.

The ALA lasted until the early 1970s. Similar to the political activism of hundreds of campus libertarian organizations and their publications, ALA operations subsided with the ending of the Vietnam War, where many campus activists joined the Libertarian Party after graduating. Rosenthal left Berkeley in 1967 to launch a business career, becoming involved in the Silver & Gold Report publication, and later the publisher of The Libertarian Forum, edited by Murray Rothbard. Sharon Presley co-founded the Association of Libertarian Feminists, and earned a Ph.D. in social psychology from City University of New York.
