= Berkeley in the Sixties =

- Original film poster
- Directed by: Mark Kitchell
- Written by: Susan Griffin; Mark Kitchell; Stephen Most
- Produced by: Mark Kitchell
- Starring: Frank Bardacke; Jentri Anders; John Gage; Jack Weinberg; Jackie Goldberg; Michael Rossman; Bobby Seale; David Hilliard; Ruth Rosen; Suzy Nelson; Barry Melton; John Searle; Mike Miller; Hardy Frye; Susan Griffin; Anne Weills
- Narrated by: Susan Griffin
- Cinematography: Stephen Lighthill
- Edited by: Veronica Selver
- Music by: Various artists
- Distributed by: California Newsreel
- Release date: September 26, 1990 (New York City)
- Running time: 118 minutes
- Country: United States
- Language: English

Berkeley in the Sixties is a 1990 documentary film by Mark Kitchell.

== Summary ==
The film highlights the origins of the Free Speech Movement beginning with the May 1960 House Un-American Activities Committee hearings at San Francisco City Hall, the development of the counterculture of the 1960s in Berkeley, California, and ending with People's Park in 1969. The film features 15 student activists and archival footage of Mario Savio, Todd Gitlin, Joan Baez, the Rev. Dr. Martin Luther King Jr., Huey Newton, Allen Ginsberg, Gov. Ronald Reagan and the Grateful Dead. The film is dedicated to Fred Cody, founder of Cody's Books. It was nominated for an Academy Award for Best Documentary Feature. It also aired on the PBS series POV.

== Critical response ==
Rotten Tomatoes assigned the film an approval rating of 100%, based on 6 reviews, with an average rating of 8.4/10. Owen Gleiberman from Entertainment Weekly gave it a grade of "A−", writing "The film doesn’t shrink from saying that many of the ’60s social-protest movements went too far. It demonstrates that by the end of the decade, protest had become a narcotic in itself. But only a movie that understands the ’60s as profoundly as this one has truly earned the right to say that."

== Awards ==
Wins

- 1990 Sundance Film Festival, Audience Award, 1990
- National Society of Film Critics Awards 1990, Best Documentary, 1991.

Nominations

- 63rd Academy Awards, Academy Award for Best Documentary Feature, 1990.
- 1990 Sundance Film Festival, Grand Jury Prize, 1990.

== See also ==
- 1990 in film
- Baby Boomers
- Generation Gap
