= History of the University of Redlands =

The University of Redlands is a Baptist-founded nondenominational university in California, United States.

== Founding the university ==
The University of Redlands had its roots in the founding of two other Baptist institutions, California College in Oakland (not to be confused with the founding institution of the University of California, but a Baptist college founded with a $28,000 endowment on a site donated by Mrs. E. H. Grey) and Los Angeles University, first proposed in 1883 by Charles Button, a preacher who convinced an association of Southern California Baptist churches to raise funds for what became Los Angeles University. Both institutions were opened in 1886, but LAU never became financially solvent, soon ceased functioning as a university, and incurred massive debts. The Baptists appointed an education commission in 1905 to raise funds to cancel the debt and reopen the university as a high school. After the San Francisco earthquake of 1906 damaged the finances of California College, the commission began exploring the liquidation of both institutions to develop a new institution in Southern California.

After the Baptist education commission tentatively accepted a proposal to join with Congregationalists to make Pomona a strong interdenominational college, Jasper Newton Field, a new Baptist pastor at Redlands, persuaded the Redlands Board of Trade to pursue the college at Redlands, California, and the Southern California Baptist convention to reject Pomona's offer.

=== The selection of Redlands ===
The convention appointed a second commission to coordinate efforts with Baptists in Northern California to establish a college in Southern California. Newton Field became first a member, then chair of the 14 member commission.

Due to miscommunication, California College retained its autonomy for the time being, leaving the commission with only the physical assets of Los Angeles University to convert into capital for a new university. Meanwhile, Redlands proposed at least 100,000 dollars and 40 acres (160,000 m^{2}) for a campus (on land donated by Baptist layman Mr. K.C. Wells) if the Baptist Church could bring in from 240,000 to 500,000 dollars towards building the university. On June 27, 1907, the commission met in Pasadena and, out of a field including Azusa, Pasadena and Riverside, voted all in favor of the Redlands proposal.

Redlands won because there was no other college in that part of the state, insuring a large local patronage. Also, there was much interdenominational interest among the local citizenry in a non-sectarian college in Redlands. Of the seven signers of the Redlands petition, only one was Baptist, but all were college men from the East and North who valued education. Of the original board of trustees of the new institution three were to be non-Baptists and laymen were to be in the majority, which marked a change from the days when higher education administration in the US was primarily conducted by ministers.

From the beginning, there was debate over what to call the new institution, a "university" or a "college." Field envisioned Redlands becoming a full university with a medical school and professional programs, although others more realistically saw it as a liberal arts college. Field's vision carried the day, however, and the Baptists charged him with raising their portion of the start-up funds. After he had successfully raised over $300,000, the board of trustees moved to elect him the first president of the University of Redlands on January 13, 1909, with the full support of the Redlands community.

Prior to the founding of the University of Redlands, The land on which the University is now located was known as the Stillman Ranch page 29, pdf. pg.78. The Stillman Ranch was "distributed to Jane L. Stanford by decree of Distribution dated Dec. 28, 1898. and same deeded to Trustees of L.S.Jr University by Jane Stanford May 30, 1899. The Stillman Ranch was 282-1/2 Acres laying between Church St/ and Judson St. Under East Lugonia Ave. and East Colton Ave pdf. pg 79. The Ranch was later sold by the trustees of L.S.Jr University on Sep. 14, 1906 for $35,000 .

=== Groundbreaking ===
Ground was broken on April 9, 1909, on the hill where the administration building now stands. On that site once stood the home of Dr. J. D. B. Stillman, personal physician to Senator Leland Stanford, part of a 100-acre (0.40 km^{2}) vineyard. After breaking ground with a shovel, Field spoke:

A short time ago we were not here; a few more years we shall have gone hence. May it be our supreme purpose while we are here to turn the best account for good the powers that God has given us. In the name of the Lord of Hosts do we set up our banners. May the educational institution located on these grounds be forever worthy of the name Christian in the best sense of the term. May its policy be neither too narrow nor too broad, but such as will redound to the glory of God and the good of mankind, having always on it the seal of divine approval. In the name of the Father, and of the Son and of the Holy Spirit.

=== The doors open ===
The nine founding faculty members held their first day of classes in the Redlands Baptist Church on September 30, 1909, with 39 students attending. Materials were borrowed from the Smiley Library, and Redlands High School offered use of their science labs. (When California College in Oakland was eventually liquidated in 1909 to produce the Berkeley Baptist Divinity School, science equipment and books not needed for divinity education were lent to Redlands in 1914.)

Almost immediately, tensions developed between students and the faculty. On December 18, 1909, the faculty tabled a resolution forbidding student attendance at dances or card parties without written permission of parents. The trustees supported the faculty, absolutely forbidding student dancing or card playing, and later further prohibited students from marrying, prohibitions which lasted over three decades.

On January 27, 1910, the University of Redlands opened its physical doors by occupying the newly completed Administration building. Bekins Hall and the President's mansion were the only two other buildings completed. President Field was charged with further securing $200,000 for endowment, but the Great Freeze of 1911, which wiped out half the California citrus crop and severely damaged the local economy, made this impossible. Field went east for help, but came back almost empty handed. Faculty salaries became 7 months in arrears, but the faculty stayed on with credit extended by the local community to keep the school open.

After the trustees decided "that it would be in the best interest of the University to temporarily use the president's home for the music department," President Field resigned in 1914. The trustees were responding to criticism of UR's cost outlays as reported to the Northern Baptist Convention. As accounts stood, the Northern Baptist's education board would not endorse the university to prospective donors. Victor LeRoy Duke, Dean and Professor of Mathematics, took over as acting president. He was formally appointed by the trustees on June 24, 1915.

== Redlands during and after the Great War years ==
With the change in administration from Field to Duke, the dream of building a large university faded to a determined focus on building and retaining a strong liberal arts college. However, for the first several years operating deficits continued to average $17,617 annually. The Southern California Baptist community called a mass-meeting in Los Angeles, endorsed the school as "the Baptist College of the Southwest," and initiated a campaign to raise $50,000 to clear outstanding debt. The following spring the Northern Baptist Education Board, after meeting with the Trustees, reversed their decision of two years earlier and also endorsed the school, promising to help raise an endowment.

After the U.S. entered World War I in 1917, the national Baptist campaign for UR's endowment was called off. The trustees and faculty had decided that no beginning classes in German would be offered, and required a pledge of loyalty to the United States from graduating seniors before degrees were conferred. Continued fundraising for UR depended mainly on the local efforts of George Cortner, UR's business manager, while President Duke adjusted the college to a war-time economy. The university recruited 131 men to qualify the campus for the Students’ Army Training Corps program, whose tuition expenses were to be paid by the federal government in exchange for military training. However, due to the armistice, the Corps was ordered demobilized before the end of its first term, though the new recruits made 1918-19 a banner year for Redlands athletics.

Tensions between faculty and students continued. Determining in May 1918 that "the existence of fraternities and sororities in this democratic institution is not for the best interests of the University of Redlands" the faculty invited the students’ "cooperation with the object of their ultimate elimination." The students requested, deftly, that the faculty provide substitutes for their organizations before they gave them up. Hazing and other rowdiness were becoming issues, however, so the trustees and faculty ultimately decided in 1923 that residential fraternity houses would not be allowed. Criticism of the faculty in the student newspaper that year brought a faculty motion that any article concerning the administration must be submitted to the president's approval before publication.

By 1925, Redlands employed 25, and student enrollment had increased to 465. Finances had improved to the extent that, with significant volunteer help, UR was able to erect 12 new buildings by the end of the decade. New dormitories, classrooms, a library, memorial chapel and gymnasium were built. A school of education was added. The developing alumni base also started to support the university. The first alumni gift to the school, in planning since 1916, was the Greek theater completed in 1927. By 1928, the University's endowment was $2,592,000, the fourth largest in the state and among the top ten percent of American universities.

=== Statements of faith ===
In the post-war readjustment period following the armistice, concerns for orthodoxy in religious leadership lead the Northern Baptist Convention to send inquiries to various denominational institutions investigating the loyalty of students, faculty and administration to Baptist doctrine. In response, the UR Trustees passed a "loyal Baptist doctrinal declaration" in 1923, which read:

The trustees of the University of Redlands … hereby reaffirm and declare their continued faith in the historic Baptist position in regard to the Great Doctrines of the Bible, especially in the inspiration and authority of the Holy Scriptures, the Deity of Jesus Christ, His supernatural Birth, and Resurrection and His sacrificial Atonement.

We further declare that it is the purpose of the University of Redlands to remain faithful to these historic Baptist principles. (Minutes of the Board of Trustees, June 19, 1923)

Furthermore, in 1926 they resolved:

…that we recognize and appreciate the distinct field of service of the Christian college, namely, in addition to a high standard of scholarship, its main objective is the molding of Christian character and that this is best made possible through the fostering of faith by the emphasis placed on spiritual things both in the class room and in the social contact of faculty with the students.

Resolved, further, that prior to the employment of a teacher for a position on the faculty of the University of Redlands, such person shall be made acquainted with the above and shall not be employed unless he is in sympathy with and desirous cooperating with the program of the University of Redlands.

Resolved, further, that it is the will of the University of Redlands that any teacher who may find himself out of sympathy with the program and purpose of the University shall without controversy or delay, tender his resignation. (Statement of Faith, June 7, 1926)

Thus, statements of faith in Baptist doctrine were required of faculty appointments to the University. Still, the number of non-Baptists interested in a Redlands education continued to grow, and by 1927 non-Baptists for the first time exceeded the numbers of Baptists enrolled at Redlands. The Trustees responded by requesting the students and faculty help frame a declaration addressing the ideals of the University, which were:

To establish and maintain a Christian institution of higher education which emphasizes the spiritual life; in which students may search for the truth, unhampered by prejudice, superstition, or skepticism, and in an atmosphere permeated by the spirit of the Great Teacher – to the end that they become men and women, whose wholesome bodies are fit temples for the indwelling of the Holy Spirit; whose social graces make them welcome where gentlefolk congregate; whose keen minds enrich scholarship; whose reverent souls worship God in spirit and in truth; whose loyal lives exemplify the teachings of Jesus Christ and serve to advance His Kingdom and His righteousness. (Report of the Committee on Ideals, January 27, 1931)

=== Redlands during the Great Depression ===
By the beginning of 1932, the effects of the Great Depression started to be felt at the University. Enrollment soared, as there was no work to be found, but student indebtedness also increased exponentially, as well as the amount the University owed banks. Salaries were cut, and employees were laid-off. On March 3, 1933, the day after the governor declared a moratorium on banks, President Duke died of a cerebral hemorrhage.

In the wake of Duke's death, antagonism developed between the faculty and trustees over forced retirements and other severances. The Trustees appointed Dr. W. Rafferty acting president on the day of Duke's funeral, but as he did not want the job on a permanent basis a nationwide search was immediately undertaken for Duke's successor. The board unanimously elected lay member Dr. Clarence Howe Thurber, Dean of Faculty and Director of Education at Colgate University, as the third president of the University of Redlands.

Although Dr. Thurber agreed with the "statement of faith" required of all UR faculty since 1926, he quickly became known as a relentless innovator. "Education," he stated at his inaugural address on December 6, 1933, "cannot be ‘poured in’ or ‘plastered on,’ it must be ‘rooted out’ for oneself ... Leaners not learners result from spoon feeding ... Shall we not then, re-examine our whole set up in an endeavor to quicken the love of learning?" He proceeded to do so, working with the Faculty to reorganize the curriculum to make it "abreast of the foremost institutions of the nation."

His administration, however, soon ran afoul of ultra-conservative churches. Their student members complained of a liberal attitude toward Baptist doctrine being inoculated by Robert H. Lynn, Crawford Professor of Biblical, Missionary and Ethical Instruction. Although the trustees attempted to assuage the matter by conducting a hearing between Lynn and the complaining students, the report they issued commending the Christian spirit of both parties further alienated the critical Baptists.

==== The Upton Sinclair affair ====
Although the Redlands community initially supported the faculty's academic freedom, the later affair of Dr. William H. Roberts, a Redlands psychology professor who became the campaign manager for Upton Sinclair's run for governor in 1934, severely strained town and gown relations in the predominantly Republican community.

The affair lead to the undoing of President Thurber. Although he requested Roberts drop all political activity at once, which Roberts promised to do, Roberts later discovered Thurber acted without authorization of the Board of Trustees, so he continued to speak for Upton Sinclair in public under the assumed name of "Allan Brand." Sinclair had already lost the election by the time Thurber found out about it three months later; he was so incensed he charged Roberts with unethical conduct, and furthermore presided over his trial before the Faculty Council as both prosecutor and juryman. While the faculty trial returned a verdict of "not guilty as charged," it recommended Roberts be fired anyway. Thurber himself resigned two years later; too many people had come to view him as both an autocratic authoritarian and inept administrator, though the event was also viewed as a victory for Baptist fundamentalists on the Board of Trustees.

==== Sectarian strife continues ====
The schism between sectarianism and non-sectarianism continued through the administration of Elam J. Anderson, Redland's fourth president. Formerly the President of Linfield College in Oregon, he was a deeply religious man, and though he also believed in the scholastic ideal of the denominational college as a non-sectarian institution, he did not find evangelical zeal incompatible with intellectual inquiry. As he said at the Southern California Baptist Convention four months before assuming office, "The Baptist is the first denomination which has insisted that each person has the right to think for himself."'

As President, Anderson spent so much time in off-campus outreach to the Baptist community that non-Baptist students and some faculty felt neglected. However, he was an open and capable enough administrator to create diplomatic channels for hearing and handling complaints. Still, the ultra-conservative churches never forgot their suspicions. In 1941 they appointed a committee to survey all church members requesting signed complaints against Robert Lynn, which they sent in summary to Lynn and President Anderson, requesting a private meeting in Los Angeles to discuss them. They complied, though this was unprecedented, and raised concerns for academic freedom among the faculty. Anderson assuaged them by promising all parties that the only reason for the meeting would be for the investigating committee to "gain a new understanding of the task, our ideals and prayers for the University, and a sympathetic acquaintance with Professor Lynn." Although the meeting was successful to that effect, the churches represented by the investigating committee did not accept their recommendation to continue supporting the university. Anderson continued to hold his ground, however, refusing to submit academic freedom to sectarian authority, and the problem gradually eased when the more militant churches broke from the Northern Baptist Convention in the middle 40s.

== Redlands during and after World War II ==
The 1940s brought many changes to the University of Redlands. They began with the bombing of Pearl Harbor. As conscriptions and enlistments for the war depleted classes, courses were set up for the soldiers at Camp Haan and March Field. Physical education and military science courses at the college began to assume a much higher priority. An emergency control center was set up in California Hall, and drills were conducted in event Redlands was bombed.

Although the war-time economy was disastrous to faculty finances, the University itself was on a much surer footing. Rather than cut salaries or lay-off employees, the Trustees promised to borrow against capital to maintain "an efficient educational program" and "efficient faculty personnel." By February 12, 1942, in fact, for the first time in twenty years, the University was completely out of debt.

The July 1, 1943, arrival of a Navy V-12 unit, composed of 631 men for officer candidate training, along with a civilian enrollment of 473 women and 110 men, gradually lead to the easing of social restrictions at Redlands. Military men were not required to attend chapel, and on New Year's Eve the Marines clandestinely held the first impromptu dance ever at Redlands. Two months later, the Navy held the first formal dance on the commons, and the Trustees finally discarded the "no dancing" policy in 1945, after the Redlands V-12 unit had been disbanded.

President Anderson died unexpectedly in 1944. Rather than select an acting president, Redlands was run by a faculty administrative committee for a while. In June 1945, the Trustees elected George H. Armacost, then head of Education at William and Mary, the fifth president of the University. He served as president for 25 years, leading the university through times of tremendous change, and instituting it. As he later said in a 1990s interview, in order to establish himself "one of the first things I had to do was root out the old-line Baptists from the Board."

The passage of the GI Bill the year before further opened the doors at Redlands. By special action of Congress, housing units from Washington State University for 50 veteran's families were installed on campus. Of the 219 graduates of June 1949, 126 were veterans, and of these 70 were married, breaking Redlands' longstanding policy against student marriage.

The 50s saw other changes. Fraternity houses were established for the first time, and other improvements made to the university. KUOR, the university's radio station, began broadcasting in 1955. The first Ph.D. ever granted by the University was received in 1957, by Milton D. Hummex, in Philosophy.

Faced with increased competition for student recruiting due to the establishment of new state universities in Riverside and San Bernardino, Redlands partnered with other institutions to form the Independent Colleges of Southern California organization in 1952, to jointly publicize their programs and solicit support from local industry. In 1954, an Association of Independent California Accredited Colleges and Universities of both Northern and Southern California was formed to lobby the state legislature on issues affecting their campuses. New, ambitious fund raising goals were set in anticipation of Redlands' 50th anniversary in 1959.

== Redlands during the 1960s and 1970s ==
The effects of the free speech movement began to be felt at Redlands in 1967, when students invited Bettina Aptheker, a Cal student and avowed Communist, to speak on campus. Although the event occurred without violence or other disruption to the university, Armacost suspended the organizers for five weeks in violation of a 1963 Board policy that explicitly prohibited communists from speaking on campus. He later reduced the suspensions to two and a half weeks, and a university and community council was developed for approving controversial speakers.

In this time, planning started for an experimental college to be attached to the University of Redlands. James Graham Johnston, of IBM, made the founding grant, and buildings were constructed for the purpose of developing Johnston College as a separate institution that would complement Redlands, similar to the way the Claremont Consortium was organized. Although the Redlands planners only intended it to be an academically autonomous school of foreign policy, in line with the ordinary conventions of the university, those directly involved as its students and faculty envisioned Johnston as something far different.

Dr. Presley McCoy, Johnston's first Chancellor, developed its contract-driven pedagogical philosophy by means of a series of encounter groups held at an initiating student and faculty retreat at Pilgrim Pines, Yuciapa, in September 1969. This encounter-driven approach became the lasting pedagogical philosophy of Johnston. According to John Watt, a faculty fellow who was present at Pilgrim Pines:

Certainly one of Johnston's major and most lasting objectives was to find ways of combining education of mind and heart. This was expressed in the language of the times as combining cognitive and effective learning, creating a living learning environment and confluent education. None of these concepts does justice to the intensity with which the College engaged in this process, especially under the leadership of its first Chancellor Pressley McCoy... McCoy's approach... was the force which brought about Pilgrim Pines and which introduced the encounter group mode into every social structure, from classes to faculty and community meetings. -John Watt, "Johnston College: A Retrospective View", Journal of Humanistic Psychology, XXI (Spring 1981), pp. 41-42.

This approach did not bode well with President Armacost, who went to Pilgrim Pines in order to discuss McCoy's controversial hiring of Jeanne Friedman, an avowed Communist, as a faculty member, following her well-publicized arrest for felonies at Stanford. According to Ed Williams, another professor present at these events:

A great moment of truth came at Pilgrim Pines when the University President came to the terrible realization that some promises he never could endorse had gone out to all 180 vibrating students, in materials he hadn't read carefully enough. There was an amazing confrontation with the President and Pres McCoy on a public platform sticking their jaws out at each other. Pres said, 'We have the right to develop our own social rules,' President Armacost said, 'Pres, you do not and you never did.'

The profound repercussions of that confrontation alone almost blew up Pilgrim Pines; and we faculty, consciously, deliberately went much further in developing academic collegiality with students than we otherwise might have done, just as a way of relieving their anger and frustration over social control issues.

I suppose a fourth seed of destruction was thereby sown. Because students emerged with split feelings, almost split personalities: 'The academic program is ours and well will live by it heart and soul; but the student life policies are theirs, and we will undermine them however we can. We will develop our own group ethic of self-protective disobedience. -Ed Williams, "A Confirmation and Critique", Journal of Humanistic Psychology, XXI (Spring 1981, p 20-21)

These objectives were realized when Armacost suspended a Johnston girl for keeping a cat in her dorm, in violation of health regulations. McCoy readmitted her, and her cat, a few weeks later, which was one of many factors leading to McCoy's forced resignation in 1971. These events continued to be debated on campus for years afterward; however, as an independent institution, Johnston had lost the support of both the University and the community of Redlands.

Broader student militancy at Redlands lead to compulsory chapel attendance gradually being discontinued in the early 1970s. The seventh President of the University, Dr. Douglas Moore, was not even Baptist. The campus became truly interdenominational and multicultural, going for years without Baptist clergymen on the Board of Trustees, but remained true to the spirit of its founding.
