= Jack Weinberg =

American activist (born 1940)

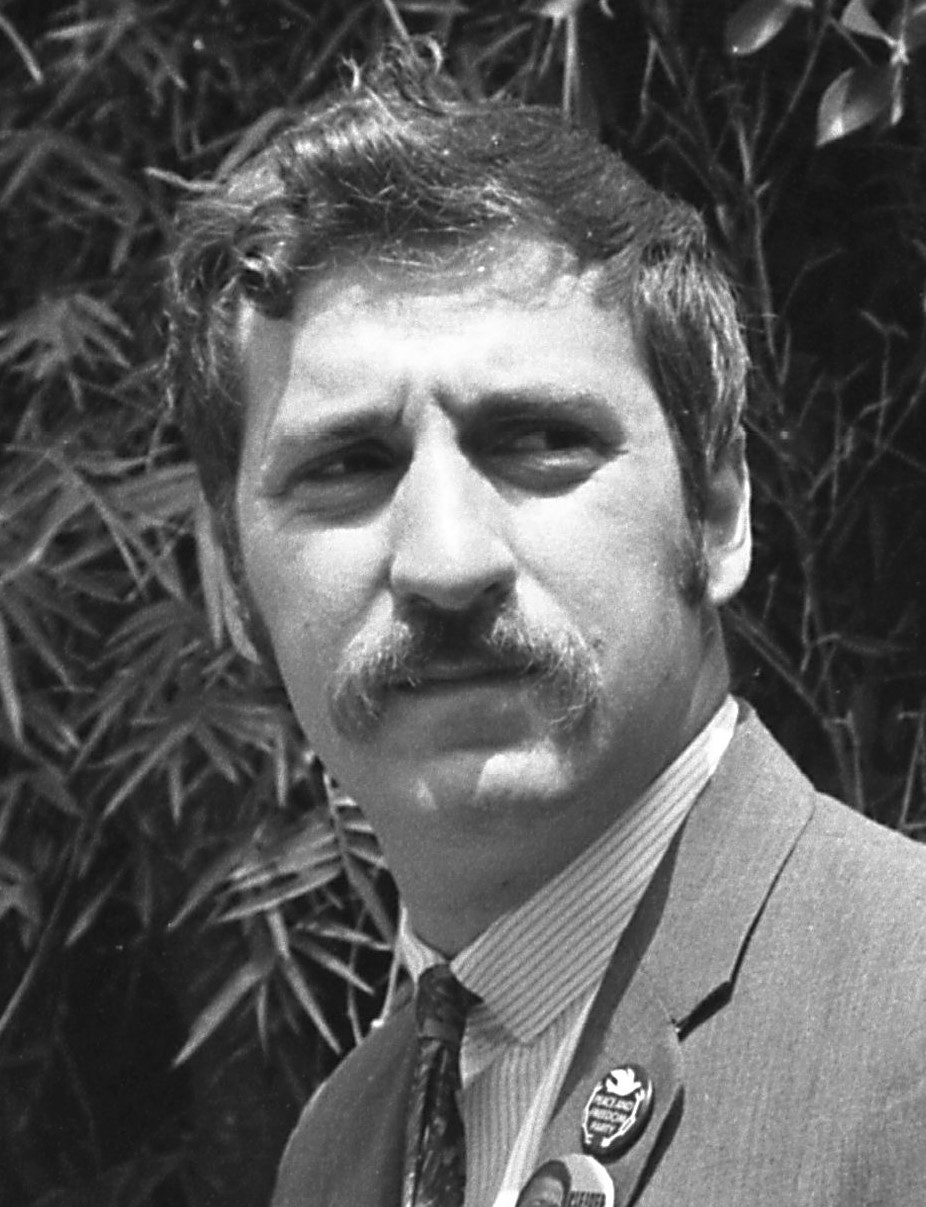
- Weinberg in 1968
- Born: April 4, 1940 (age 86); Buffalo, New York, U.S.
- Education: University of California, Berkeley (BA)
- Occupation: Environmental consultant
- Known for: Free Speech Movement, environmental activism
- Spouse: Valerie Denney

Jack Weinberg (born April 4, 1940) is an American environmental activist and former New Left activist who is best known for his role in the Free Speech Movement at the University of California, Berkeley, in 1964.

== Early life ==
Weinberg was born in Buffalo, New York, on April 4, 1940, and grew up there. His father owned a small jewelry business in Buffalo.

He began college at the University of Buffalo. At age 21 he transferred to the University of California, Berkeley, majoring in mathematics. He graduated in January 1963.

In the spring semester of 1963, Weinberg continued at Berkeley as a graduate student in the mathematics department, where he was a teaching assistant.

Weinberg's first participation in a political organization occurred in 1963, when he joined the Berkeley chapter of the Congress of Racial Equality (CORE).

Weinberg spent the summer of 1963 traveling in the South and visiting civil rights groups. He returned to Berkeley and began his second semester of graduate school in the fall of 1963 but then withdrew mid-semester to devote himself full-time to civil rights activities. He became the head of Campus CORE.

Weinberg remained in the Bay Area throughout the summer of 1964. (Note: Some sources incorrectly state that Weinberg went to Mississippi in the summer of 1964 and took part in Freedom Summer. FSM activists Mario Savio and Malcolm Zaretsky did so, but Weinberg did not.)

== Free Speech Movement ==
In the fall semester of 1964, Weinberg was engaged in student activism at the University of California, Berkeley. On October 1, 1964, Weinberg was sitting at the CORE table in Sproul Plaza. He refused to show his identification to the campus police and was arrested at noon for violating the university's new rules regarding student political activism. There was a spontaneous movement of students to surround the police car in which he was to be transported. They sat on the ground around the police car, preventing it from moving.

Throughout the night and into the next day, students, including Mario Savio, gave speeches from atop the car calling for free speech on campus. Weinberg, too, addressed the crowd from the top of the police car. At one point, there may have been 3,000 students around the car. On the evening of October 2, 1964, approximately 24 hours later, representatives of political groups on campus signed an agreement with the administration regarding student free speech, which was dubbed the Pact of October 2. After being confined in the police car for 32 hours, Weinberg was then booked and freed as the agreement stipulated that the university would not press charges against him. However, less than a week later, the Alameda County District Attorney pressed charges against Weinberg, but because no one would sign a complaint, the case was dropped in mid-October. Jack Weinberg called his close friend and classmate John Wingfield McGuire to pick him up from jail and bring him to John and Rosemary McGuire's house on Russell Street near Telegraph Avenue, where Weinberg began organizing the next steps for the free speech movement.

The first meeting of the Free Speech Movement (FSM) took place on October 3, in Art Goldberg's apartment. The first order of business was to choose a name for the organization. Several names were proposed, including Students for Free Speech, United Free Speech Movement, University Rights Movement, and Students for Civil Liberties. Weinberg suggested "Free Speech Movement" and it was adopted by a margin of one vote.

FSM leader Mario Savio later stated that Jack Weinberg was the FSM's key tactician. Historian W. J. Rorabaugh calls Weinberg "one of the most effective civil rights organizers" and "the strategist behind FSM." An Oakland Tribune photo from early January 1965 shows Weinberg speaking, alongside Savio, to a large campus crowd.

=== "Don't trust anyone over 30" ===
Weinberg is credited with the phrase, "Don't trust anyone over 30". Often misattributed to Abbie Hoffman, Jerry Rubin, the Beatles, and others, Weinberg coined the phrase during a November 1964 interview about the Free Speech Movement with a reporter for the San Francisco Chronicle. Weinberg later described the incident:

I was being interviewed by a newspaper reporter, and he was making me very angry. It seemed to me his questions were implying that we were being directed behind the scenes by Communists or some other sinister group. I told him we had a saying in the movement that we don't trust anybody over 30. It was a way of telling the guy to back off, that nobody was pulling our strings.

On November 15, 1964, the Chronicle printed the story, quoting Weinberg as saying "We have a saying in the movement that you can't trust anybody over 30."

Chronicle columnist Ralph J. Gleason highlighted the saying in his column on November 18. The saying then went viral, becoming a favorite for reporters and columnists wishing to ridicule the young, the New Left, or the hippie/Yippie movement. This annoyed Weinberg, who has said:

I've done some things in my life I think are very important, and my one sentence in history turns out to be something I said off the top of my head which became completely distorted and misunderstood. But I've become more accepting of fate as I get older.

A close analogue to this sentiment exists in George Bernard Shaw's "Maxims for Revolutionists" (an appendix to his play Man and Superman written in-character), which include the aphorism "Every man over forty is a scoundrel."

== After FSM ==
Weinberg was active in leadership of the Vietnam Day Committee (VDC), a coalition that organized rallies and marches opposing the Vietnam War.

On Friday night, October 15, 1965, the VDC held an anti-war march that began at the UC Berkeley campus and was intended to end at the Oakland Army Terminal. The march left the UC campus at 7:52 p.m. after an all-day rally there. Marchers carried anti-U.S. foreign policy signs and chanted anti-war slogans. There were 10,000–14,000 people in the march. At the head of the march was a banner carried by a line of marchers, then a sound truck containing VDC leaders including Jack Weinberg, Bettina Aptheker, Jerry Rubin, Stephen Smale, Steve Weissman, Frank Bardacke, and Robert Scheer. Also in the truck was poet Allen Ginsberg chanting the Heart Sutra. The City of Oakland had refused to grant the march a permit, and so Oakland Police blocked Telegraph Avenue at the Oakland border with a phalanx of 375 policemen. When the march neared the border, it came to a halt while the leaders considered what to do. Weinberg and Bardacke got out of the truck, crossed the police line, and met with Oakland Police Chief Edward M. Toothman. Weinberg and Bardacke could not persuade Toothman to let the march proceed into Oakland, so they returned to the sound truck and told the other VDC leaders. A debate ensued about what to do; they voted 5–4 to turn back into Berkeley.

Weinberg joined the Independent Socialist Club in 1966 and helped organize it into a national movement—the International Socialists—of which he was a national council member.

Weinberg has said that the Stop the Draft Week protests of October 16–21, 1967, were "the first clear demonstration that the radical part of the Anti-Vietnam war movement was coming up against its own limitations. It didn't really have the weight in society to stop the war."

Weinberg moved to Los Angeles to work as labor correspondent for a radical weekly underground newspaper, the Los Angeles Free Press. Becoming involved in the formation of the socialist Peace and Freedom Party of California, he organized the registration drive that collected enough signatures to get the party on the California ballot in the 1968 elections. Weinberg served as the California state chairperson of the Party from August 1968 until November 1968.

In November 1968, Weinberg was the Peace and Freedom Party candidate for congress in California's 26th congressional district election (Los Angeles area); he received 3% of the vote.

=== Labor movement ===
In following years, Weinberg was a union activist. In 1973, he was a participant in wildcat strikes at Chrysler plants in Detroit, Michigan, as a member of United Auto Workers (UAW) Local 212. He wrote a book about those strikes.

In 1975, Weinberg was the editor of Network, Voice of UAW Militants, a bimonthly magazine for members of UAW.

He then moved to Gary, Indiana, where he became a steelworker and was involved in the United Steelworkers union.

=== Environmental movement ===
In 1982, Weinberg led a coalition of environmentalists, unionists, and community members in defeating a proposal to construct a nuclear power plant in Indiana on Lake Michigan.

He worked for Greenpeace from 1989 to 2000. He then began working for the Environmental Health Fund.

Weinberg is a consultant to groups seeking to clean up environmental pollution.

== Personal life ==
He is married to Valerie Denney. Weinberg is a grandfather of three and has an adjunct faculty position in public health at the University of Illinois at Chicago.
