= Paul Montauk =

American activist (1922–1998)

Paul Montauk (1922–1998) was an American communist and lifelong member of the Socialist Workers Party.

Paul Montauk was born in Staten Island, New York, in 1922. His father was a jeweler and watch repairman, whose small business collapsed under the impact of the Great Depression of the 1930s. After his mother remarried following his father's death, Montauk was raised by an aunt in the Bronx. Montauk was 16 years old when his impoverished aunt threw him on the street. He soon quit school and tried to find full-time work.

Montauk joined the Trotskyist Socialist Workers Party's Brooklyn branch in 1939, when he was 17 years old. It was at the outbreak of the Second World War. Faced with the draft, Montauk enlisted in the Navy after discussing his options with party leaders. The Socialist Workers Party's official stance was to oppose the "imperialist war" and party members who were drafted actively spread socialist propaganda to the other soldiers.

In the early 1950s, Montauk moved to Detroit to build the SWP branch there. The SWP faced the state of Michigan's 1952 "Trucks Law", which made membership in organizations deemed "subversive" by the government a crime. The SWP waged a successful fight to have the law declared unconstitutional. Prevented by the employers' blacklist from working in the auto industry and being active as a socialist in the United Auto Workers union, Montauk worked as a chef — a job he would hold off and on for the rest of his life. He participated in socialist election campaigns, and joined with others in the SWP to raise funds to donate cars for use by Black civil rights fighters in Montgomery, Alabama, during the 1955-1956 Montgomery bus boycott. The party campaigned nationally for cars and donations, and for solidarity with the fighters in Montgomery. Montauk often spoke at public political forums and lectures despite open police and FBI intimidation.

Paul Montauk moved to Oakland in 1959 and remained in the Bay Area through 1976. Montauk was a leader of party branches in Oakland and Berkeley. He was the party's candidate for mayor of Oakland in 1961 and 1963.

In 1960 he married Mary Lou Dobbs, his companion for the rest of his life. Before her, Montauk had been married to Louise Keene. Montauk had two daughters, Susan and Juliette, one from each of his marriages.

As the movement against the Vietnam War developed, particularly on the University of California Berkeley campus, Montauk helped to found the Vietnam Day Committee, one of the principal anti-war organizations in the Bay Area.

Montauk served as a member of the Socialist Workers Party's national committee from 1963 to 1973. He and others on the national committee supported a transition in leadership to a younger generation who were shouldering the major day-to-day responsibility for leading the party. Montauk continued to function as part of the broader party leadership after leaving the national committee.

During this time, Paul taught cooking in a Job Corps program. He also studied education, and received a master's degree in education from San Francisco State University in 1970. He continued to work as a teacher in vocational and public schools, and was an active member of the American Federation of Teachers for around 15 years. Prior to his retirement in 1995, Paul worked as a permanent substitute teacher at Oakland Technical High School.

In 1976, Paul and his wife Mary Lou moved to New York City to take assignments needed by the party. Mary Lou worked on party finances. Paul worked in the SWP's national office. Among other assignments he took was one in the national education department, where he edited many of the Education for Socialists bulletins used to educate party members in Marxism.

Montauk supported the SWP's turn to industry decision, which meant that a vast majority of the party's members should take traditional working class jobs within the meatpacking, mining and textile industries. Some members didn't like this idea and left the party.

In the wake of the 1991 collapse of the Soviet Union, representatives of Pathfinder Press traveled to Russia to "save" books by Marx, Engels, and Lenin from being sold for pulp. In San Francisco, the American Communist Party closed its bookstore. Sensing what was happening, Montauk rushed to arrange to purchase their remaining stock of Marxist literature at fire sale prices.

Montauk's health declined over the last decade of his life and in his final few years Montauk was afflicted with Parkinson's disease and other infirmities, but he continued to make an active contribution to the SWP. Paul participated in meetings of the SWP branch in San Francisco until the last two weeks of his life.
