= Free Speech Movement =

Student protest in California, 1964–1965

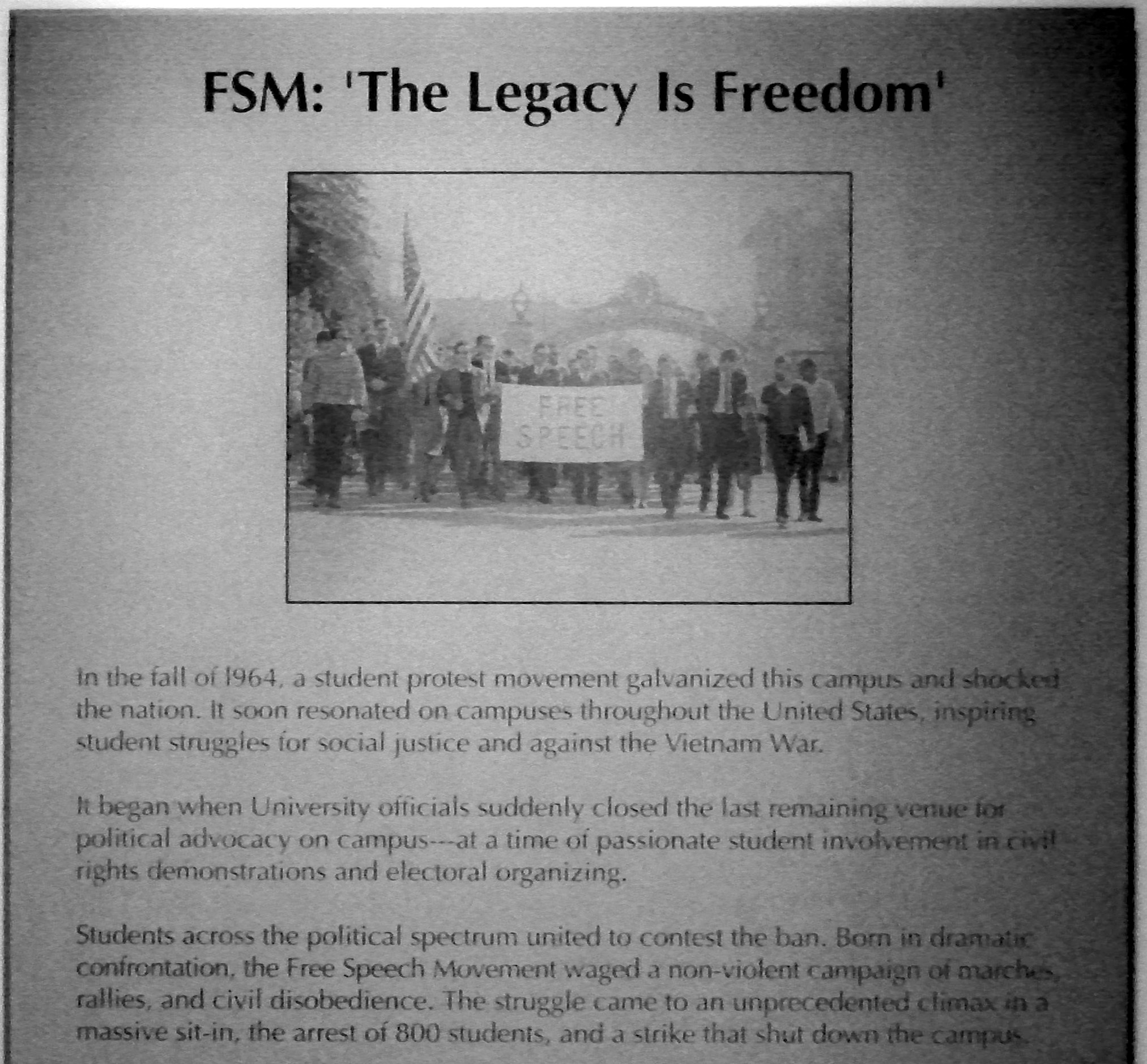
Memorial to the Free Speech Movement at UC Berkeley

The Free Speech Movement (FSM) was a student protest which took place during the 1964–65 academic year on the campus of the University of California, Berkeley. Student leaders included Jack Weinberg, Tom Miller, Mario Savio, Michael Rossman, George Barton, Brian Turner, Bettina Aptheker, Steve Weissman, Michael Teal, Art Goldberg, Jackie Goldberg and others.

With the participation of thousands of students, the Free Speech Movement was among the first mass acts of civil disobedience on American college campuses in the 1960s. Students insisted that the university administration lift the ban of on-campus political activities and acknowledge the students' right to free speech and academic freedom. The Free Speech Movement was influenced by the New Left, and was also related to the civil rights movement and the anti-Vietnam War movement. To this day, the Movement's legacy continues to shape American political dialogue both on college campuses and in broader society, influencing some political views and values of college students and the general public.

== 1964–1965 ==
=== Background ===
In 1958, activist students organized SLATE, a campus political party meaning a "slate" of candidates running on the same level –a same "slate." The students created SLATE to promote the right of student groups to support off-campus issues.

In the fall of 1964, student activists, some of whom had traveled with the Freedom Riders and worked to register African American voters in Mississippi in the Freedom Summer project, set up information tables on campus and were soliciting donations for causes connected to the civil rights movement. According to existing rules at the time, fundraising for political parties was limited exclusively to the Democratic and Republican school clubs.

There was also a mandatory "loyalty oath" required of faculty, which had led to dismissals and ongoing controversy over academic freedom. Sol Stern, a former radical who took part in the Free Speech Movement, stated in a 2014 City Journal article that the group viewed the United States government to be racist and imperialist, and that the main intent after lifting Berkeley's loyalty oath was to build on the legacy of C. Wright Mills.

On September 14, 1964, Dean Katherine Towle announced that existing University regulations prohibiting advocacy of political causes or candidates, outside political speakers, recruitment of members, and fundraising by student organizations at the intersection of Bancroft and Telegraph Avenues would be "strictly enforced."

=== December 2, 1964 sit-in ===
On October 1, 1964, former graduate student Jack Weinberg was sitting at the CORE table. He refused to show his identification to the campus police and was arrested. There was a spontaneous movement of students to surround the police car in which he was to be transported. This was a form of civil disobedience that became a major part of the movement. The police car remained there for 32 hours, all while Weinberg was inside it. At one point, there may have been 3,000 students around the car. The car was used as a speaker's podium and a continuous public discussion was held, which continued until the charges against Weinberg were dropped.

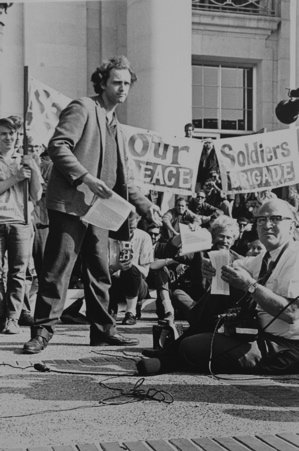
Mario Savio leading a rally on the steps of Sproul Hall in 1966

On December 2, between 1,500 and 4,000 students went into Sproul Hall as a last resort in order to re-open negotiations with the administration on the subject of restrictions on political speech and action on campus. Among other grievances was that four of their leaders were being singled out for punishment. The demonstration was orderly; students studied, watched movies, and sang folk songs. Joan Baez was there to lead in the singing, as well as lend moral support. "Freedom classes" were held by teaching assistants on one floor, and a special Channukah service took place in the main lobby. On the steps of Sproul Hall, Mario Savio gave a famous speech:

... But we're a bunch of raw materials that don't mean to be — have any process upon us. Don't mean to be made into any product! Don't mean — Don't mean to end up being bought by some clients of the University, be they the government, be they industry, be they organized labor, be they anyone! We're human beings! ... There's a time when the operation of the machine becomes so odious — makes you so sick at heart — that you can't take part. You can't even passively take part. And you've got to put your bodies upon the gears and upon the wheels, upon the levers, upon all the apparatus, and you've got to make it stop. And you've got to indicate to the people who run it, to the people who own it, that unless you're free, the machine will be prevented from working at all.

At midnight, Alameda County deputy district attorney Edwin Meese III telephoned Governor Edmund Brown Sr., asking for authority to proceed with a mass arrest. Shortly after 2 a.m. on December 4, 1964, police cordoned off the building, and at 3:30 a.m. began the arrest. Close to 800 students were arrested, most of whom were transported about 25 miles by bus to Santa Rita Jail in Dublin. They were released on their own recognizance after a few hours. About a month later, the university brought charges against the students who organized the sit-in, resulting in an even larger student protest that all but shut down the university.

=== Aftermath ===
After much disturbance, the University officials slowly backed down. By January 3, 1965, the new acting chancellor, Martin Meyerson (who had replaced the previous resigned Edward Strong), established provisional rules for political activity on the Berkeley campus. He designated the Sproul Hall steps an open discussion area during certain hours of the day and permitted information tables. This applied to the entire student political spectrum, not just the liberal elements that drove the Free Speech Movement.

Most outsiders, however, identified the Free Speech Movement as a movement of the Left. Students and others opposed to U.S. foreign policy did indeed increase their visibility on campus following the FSM's initial victory. In the spring of 1965, the FSM was followed by the Vietnam Day Committee, a major starting point for the anti-Vietnam war movement.

=== Achievements ===
For the first time, disobedience tactics of the Civil Rights Movement were brought by the Free Speech Movement to a college campus in the 1960s. Those approaches gave the students exceptional leverage to make demands of the university administrators, and build the foundation for future protests, such as those against the Vietnam War.

== 1966–1970 ==
The Free Speech Movement had long-lasting effects at the Berkeley campus and was a pivotal moment for the civil liberties movement in the 1960s. It was seen as the beginning of the famous student activism that existed on the campus in the 1960s, and continues to a lesser degree today. There was a substantial voter backlash against the individuals involved in the Free Speech Movement. Ronald Reagan won an unexpected victory in the fall of 1966 and was elected Governor. He then directed the UC Board of Regents to dismiss UC President Clark Kerr because of the perception that he had been too soft on the protesters. The FBI kept secret files on Kerr and Savio, and subjected their lives and careers to interference under COINTELPRO.

Reagan had gained political traction by campaigning on a platform that promised to "clean up the mess in Berkeley". In the minds of those involved in the backlash, a wide variety of protests, concerned citizens, and activists were lumped together. Furthermore, television news and documentary filmmaking had made it possible to photograph and broadcast moving images of protest activity. Much of this media is available today as part of the permanent collection of the Bancroft Library at Berkeley, including iconic photographs of the protest activity by student Ron Enfield (then chief photographer for the Berkeley campus newspaper, the Daily Cal). A reproduction of what may be considered the most recognizable and iconic photograph of the movement, a shot of suit-clad students carrying the Free Speech banner through the University's Sather Gate in Fall of 1964, now stands at the entrance to the college's Free Speech Movement Cafe.

Earlier protests against the House Committee on Un-American Activities meeting in San Francisco in 1960 had included an iconic scene as protesters were literally washed down the steps inside the Rotunda of San Francisco City Hall with fire hoses. The anti-Communist film Operation Abolition depicted this scene and became an organizing tool for the protesters.

Other UC campuses sustained collateral damage from the voter backlash against the movement. For example, by the 1970s, the state electorate began to regularly vote down issuances of state bonds to raise money for UC construction projects, which had not been the case before. This severely disrupted the development of suitable buildings for the medical and veterinary medicine schools at the Davis campus. In the case of the Davis vet school, its physical facilities became so awful that the school was temporarily stripped of full accreditation in 1998 for that very reason.

== Reunions ==
The 20th anniversary reunion of the FSM was held during the first week of October, 1984, to considerable media attention. A rally in Sproul Plaza featured FSM veterans Mario Savio, who ended a long self-imposed silence, Jack Weinberg, and Jackie Goldberg. The week continued with a series of panels open to the public on the movement and its impact. The 30th anniversary reunion, held during the first weekend of December 1994, was also a public event, with another Sproul Plaza rally featuring Savio, Weinberg, Goldberg, panels on the FSM, and current free speech issues.

In April 2001, UC's Bancroft Library held a symposium celebrating the opening of the Free Speech Movement Digital Archive. Although not a formal FSM reunion, many FSM leaders were on the panels and other participants were in the audience. The 40th anniversary reunion, the first after Savio's death in 1996, was held in October 2004. It featured columnist Molly Ivins giving the annual Mario Savio Memorial Lecture, followed later in the week by the customary rally in Sproul Plaza and panels on civil liberties issues. A Sunday meeting was a more private event, primarily a gathering for the veterans of the movement, in remembrance of Savio and of a close FSM ally, professor Reginald Zelnik, who had died in an accident in May.

== Today ==
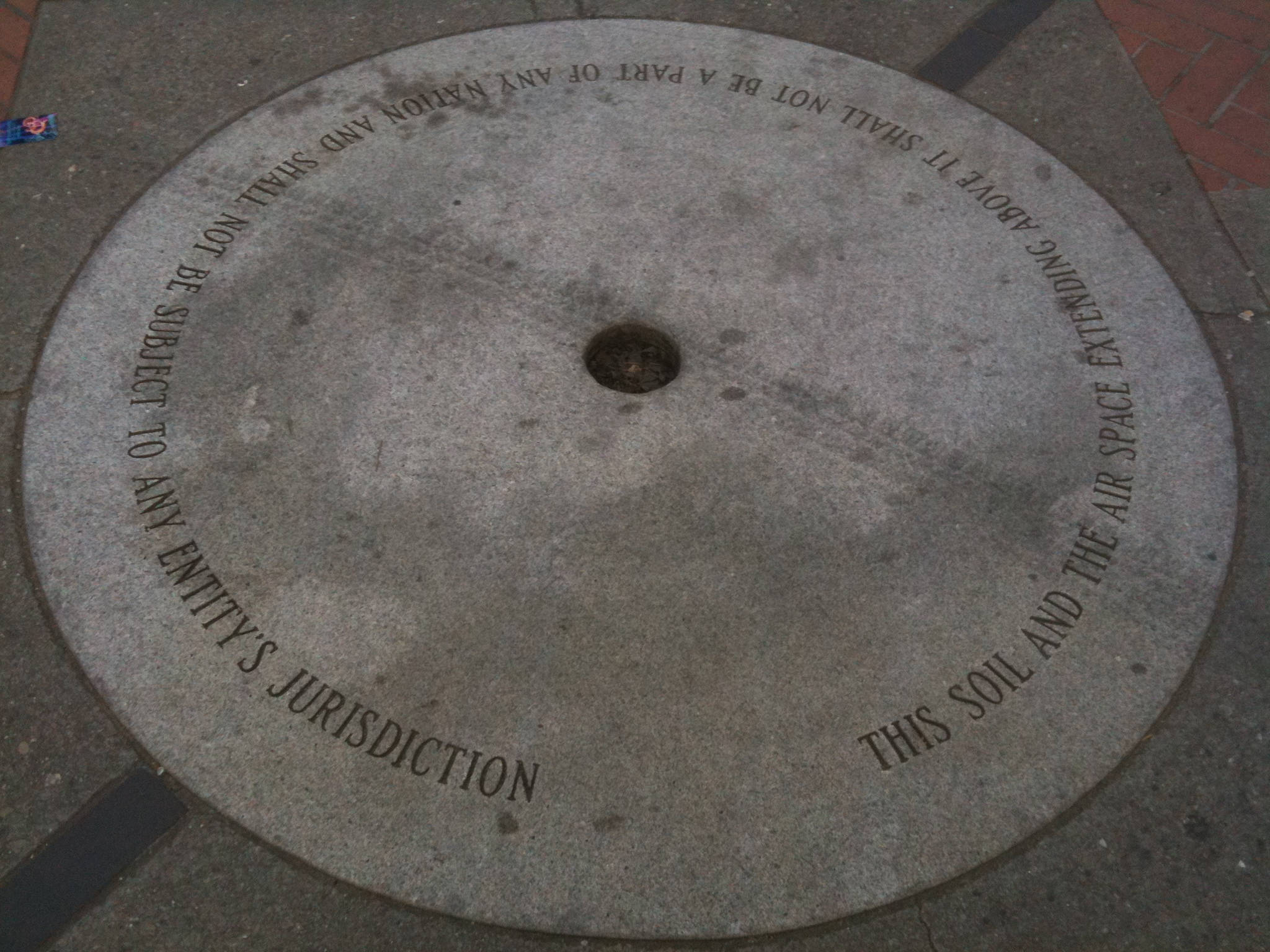
Free Speech Monument, Sproul Plaza, Berkeley, California

Today, Sproul Hall and the surrounding Sproul Plaza are active locations for protests and marches, as well as the ordinary daily tables with free literature. Groups of political, religious and social persuasions set up tables at Sproul Plaza. The Sproul steps, now officially known as the "Mario Savio Steps", may be reserved for a speech or rally. An on-campus restaurant commemorating the event, the Mario Savio Free Speech Movement Cafe, resides in a portion of the Moffitt Undergraduate Library.

The Free Speech Monument, commemorating the movement, was created in 1991 by artist Mark Brest van Kempen, in Sproul Plaza. The monument consists of a six-inch hole in the ground filled with soil and a granite ring surrounding it. As a sort of protest autonomous zone, the granite ring bears the inscription, "This soil and the air space extending above it shall not be a part of any nation and shall not be subject to any entity's jurisdiction." The monument makes no explicit reference to the movement, but it evokes notions of free speech and its implications through its rhetoric.

== See also ==
- Berkeley riots, associated with the FSM and other events in the 1960s
- Counterculture of the 1960s
- William E. Forbes, chairman of a Regents' committee investigating student activities in this era.
- Free speech fights
- Alliance of Libertarian Activists
- Hippie
- New Left
- Students for a Democratic Society
- Tinker v. Des Moines Independent Community School District
- Town and gown
