= UC Davis School of Medicine =

Public medical school in Davis, California

University of California, Davis, School of Medicine
- Type: Public medical school
- Established: 1966
- Parent institution: University of California, Davis
- Dean: Susan Murin
- Faculty: 583 full-time faculty and 1,800 volunteer clinical faculty
- Students: ~500
- Location: Sacramento, California, U.S. 38.553147°N 121.452528°W
- Website: medschool.ucdavis.edu

The University of California Davis School of Medicine is the medical school of the University of California, Davis. While the parent institution is located in Davis, California, the medical school and its associated teaching hospital are located 17 miles (27 kilometers) east in Sacramento, California.

The original plans for the school were derailed by the 1960s Berkeley protests, which caused the state electorate to refuse to allow the state to sell bonds to raise money for construction of a medical school building and a teaching hospital at the Davis campus. The temporary solution of using the county hospital in Sacramento became a permanent one when UC agreed to buy the hospital in 1972, and it is now known as UC Davis Medical Center. A medical school building finally opened at Davis in 1977, after years in temporary structures. In 2006, teaching and clinical functions were transferred to a new building in Sacramento, leaving the basic science research departments at Davis.

== History ==
=== Founding of the school ===
In 1960, a committee commissioned by the governor to study the provision of healthcare services in California found that the state should be graduating about 1,300 new doctors per year but at the time was graduating less than 700. The committee recommended the creation of additional state-supported medical schools in order to maintain a healthy ratio of about 175 physicians to every 100,000 people. In October 1963, the Regents of the University of California authorized the Davis campus to start planning for the launch of the fourth medical school in the UC system. In the fall of 1965, Chancellor Emil M. Mrak hired Charles John Tupper from the University of Michigan as the founding dean of the new School of Medicine.

Dean Tupper formally assumed office on February 1, 1966. At the time, the medical school consisted of him, one secretary, and a budget of only $30,000. Over the next two years, Tupper recruited over 60 physicians, scientists, and lecturers to serve as the founding faculty; arranged for the medical school's first home in a cluster of small temporary prefabricated steel buildings (which eventually proliferated to a total of 44); and also signed an affiliation agreement with the county hospital in neighboring Sacramento County to use it temporarily as a teaching hospital. The first class of 48 students entered in the fall of 1968.

=== From crisis to crisis ===
The original plans for the medical school were ambitious and were never realized. In the late 1960s, UC Davis was planning for the construction of a 350-bed on-campus university hospital with outpatient clinics—that is, the Medical Sciences II (MS II) building—and was also discussing the possibility of allowing the Veterans Administration to build a 740-bed on-campus hospital. If both hospitals had been built as planned, they would have provided a sufficiently large patient population (200 patients per third-year student) to allow for clinical teaching of medicine at the Davis campus.

The 1960s Berkeley protests alienated a large part of the California electorate from the University of California. The electorate refused to pass the state bond issue placed on the November 1968 ballot. The state bond issue on the June 1970 ballot also failed to pass.

Without the state bond money it had been counting on, Davis was the financially weakest of the three new UC medical schools. During its first decade, the school stumbled from crisis to crisis and faced the constant threat of closure. In contrast, San Diego had already secured funding from the regents for a permanent building and Irvine had foundation support. To keep the medical school at Davis alive, Tupper's audacious strategy was to rapidly expand the school and make it too big to fail. On July 29, 1970, he persuaded the faculty to vote to double the size of each entering class from 52 to 100, contingent on obtaining a federal grant to pay for that expansion, and then secured a $5 million federal grant in March 1971.

In the meantime, talks broke down completely between the university and Sacramento County about upgrading the county hospital for long-term use as a clinical teaching hospital. The county board of supervisors gave notice of their intent to terminate the existing affiliation agreement by the end of 1972, which would have left the school with no teaching hospital. State assemblyman Gordon W. Duffy issued an ultimatum to both sides to settle their dispute before the state legislature needed to intervene. On March 2, 1972, it was announced that the University of California would buy the county hospital. Title was transferred on July 1, 1973, and the hospital became the Sacramento Medical Center (SMC) of the University of California, Davis.

=== The location problem: Sacramento versus Davis ===
After a vigorous campaign to educate voters on why UC needed the money, the electorate approved the 1972 bond issue, which included money for the long-delayed Medical Sciences I (MS I) building in the southwest corner of the Davis campus. The medical school looked forward to moving out of cheap metal structures and into a suitable permanent building. However, in 1973, federal cutbacks in health sciences funding caused the regents to delay the MS II building, the 350-bed university hospital, and to reallocate money from MS II to improving the newly-acquired SMC. This amplified exasperation with how MS I had been planned for the Davis campus on the wrong end of the Yolo Causeway, when it was now evident that the medical school's teaching hospital would be in Sacramento for the foreseeable future. During the summer of 1973, the furious debate about where to build MS I raged across the UC Davis campus and in the state legislature in Sacramento before it was settled once again in favor of Davis, where the medical school could remain close to the veterinary school and other research programs. Groundbreaking occurred on September 11, 1974, and the first classes were held in the new building in the fall of 1977.

While MS I was under construction, the 1976 state bond issue failed to pass at the ballot box. Because of this legislative defeat, MS II remained unfunded and was never built, so the school was never able to operate its own teaching hospital at the Davis campus as originally planned. The 740-bed VA hospital also remained unbuilt at Davis. In 2002, VA opened a much smaller 81-bed hospital on the grounds of the former Mather Air Force Base on the opposite side of Sacramento.

The school gained national attention in the late 1970s when an applicant challenged the school's affirmative action admissions policy. In a complex and split decision, the Supreme Court of the United States ruled in Regents of the University of California v. Bakke, 438 U.S. 265 (1978), that the applicant had unconstitutionally been denied admission and Bakke was admitted. They also ruled that affirmative action was legal within some limits.

As a result of its convoluted history, the school continues to maintain its research facilities on the Davis campus, while the majority of the school's teaching and clinical space is located in Sacramento, 17 miles to the east of the Davis campus. With the December 2006 opening of its new Education Building, the school transitioned all medical school classes to the Sacramento campus. Classes are also held in the UC Davis Center for Health and Technology, which connects to the Education Building. Throughout their four years of medical school, students also take part in health care simulations at the UC Davis Health Center for Simulation and Education Enhancement, which is on the third floor of the UC Davis Center for Health and Technology building. Research activities continue in the same capacity at both the Davis and Sacramento campuses.

== Admissions and ranking ==
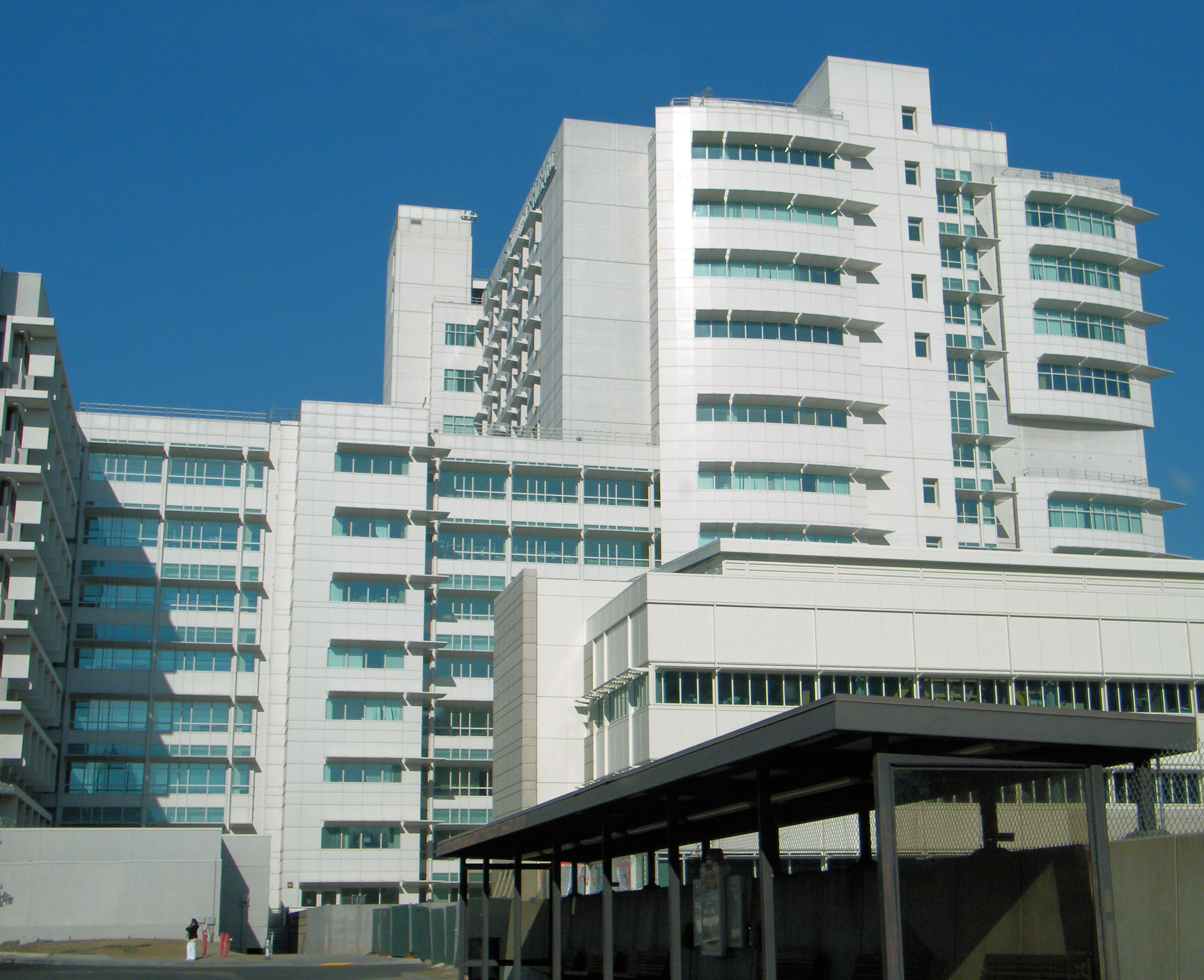
UC Davis Medical Center

Admissions is highly competitive. In 2011, the school received 4,792 applications, offered interviews to 460 applicants of which 100 matriculated. The acceptance rate for applicants to UC Davis School of Medicine is approximately 1.8%. For 2019, U.S. News & World Report ranks UC Davis School of Medicine #9 based on primary care methodology and #30 based on research methodology.

== Hospitals ==
UC Davis Medical Center, located in Sacramento, is one of five teaching hospitals in the University of California system. It ranks among the top 50 hospitals in America, according to an annual survey published by U.S. News & World Report. Other hospitals affiliated with UC Davis school of medicine include:

- UC Davis Children's Hospital
- UC Davis Cancer Center
- Shriners Hospitals for Children – Sacramento
- Sacramento VA Medical Center
- Kaiser Permanente Medical Centers in Sacramento, Roseville, and South Sacramento

== Research ==
Faculty in the School of Medicine specializes in a wide range of basic and applied research, including those related to neuroscience, cancer biology, vascular biology, genetic diseases and functional genomics, health services, infectious diseases, nutrition, telemedicine, and vision science. The school receives approximately $90 million in NIH funding annually. About half of UC Davis medical students conduct research during their training.

== Primary care network ==
The UC Davis Medical Center operates a network of clinics that provides outpatient medical services to members of the HMO that UC Davis operates. These clinics are staffed by UC Davis medical school faculty and also by staff physicians hired directly by the primary care network (PCN).

== Student clinics ==
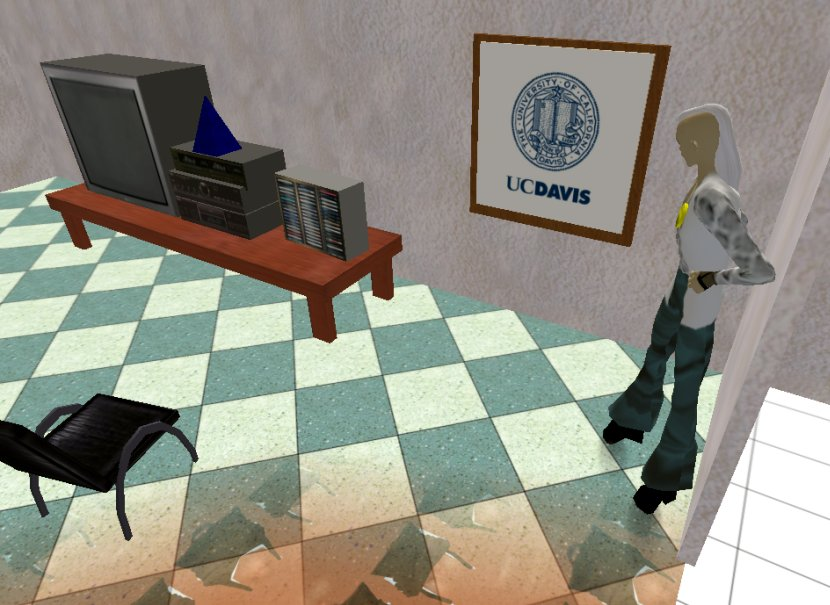
Virtual Hallucinations - A project of the UC Davis Health System using Second Life to educate about hallucinations.

UC Davis School of Medicine has student-run clinics, which offers free primary care to the uninsured, low-income and other underserved population of Sacramento and surrounding areas. These clinics provide patients quality health care and allow UC Davis medical students to gain real world clinical experience during the early stages of their training.

- Shifa Community Clinic
- Clinica Tepati
- Knights Landing Clinic
- Imani Clinic at Oak Park
- Joan Viteri Memorial Clinic
- Paul Hom Asian Clinic
- Bayanihan Clinic
- Willow Clinic
- VN CARES (Vietnamese Cancer Awareness Research and Education Society)
- HMong Lifting Underserved Barriers (H.L.U.B.) Clinic

== See also ==
- List of medical schools in the United States
