= Zellerbach Hall =

Performing arts venue on the UC Berkeley campus

Coordinates: 37°52′8″N 122°15′39″W

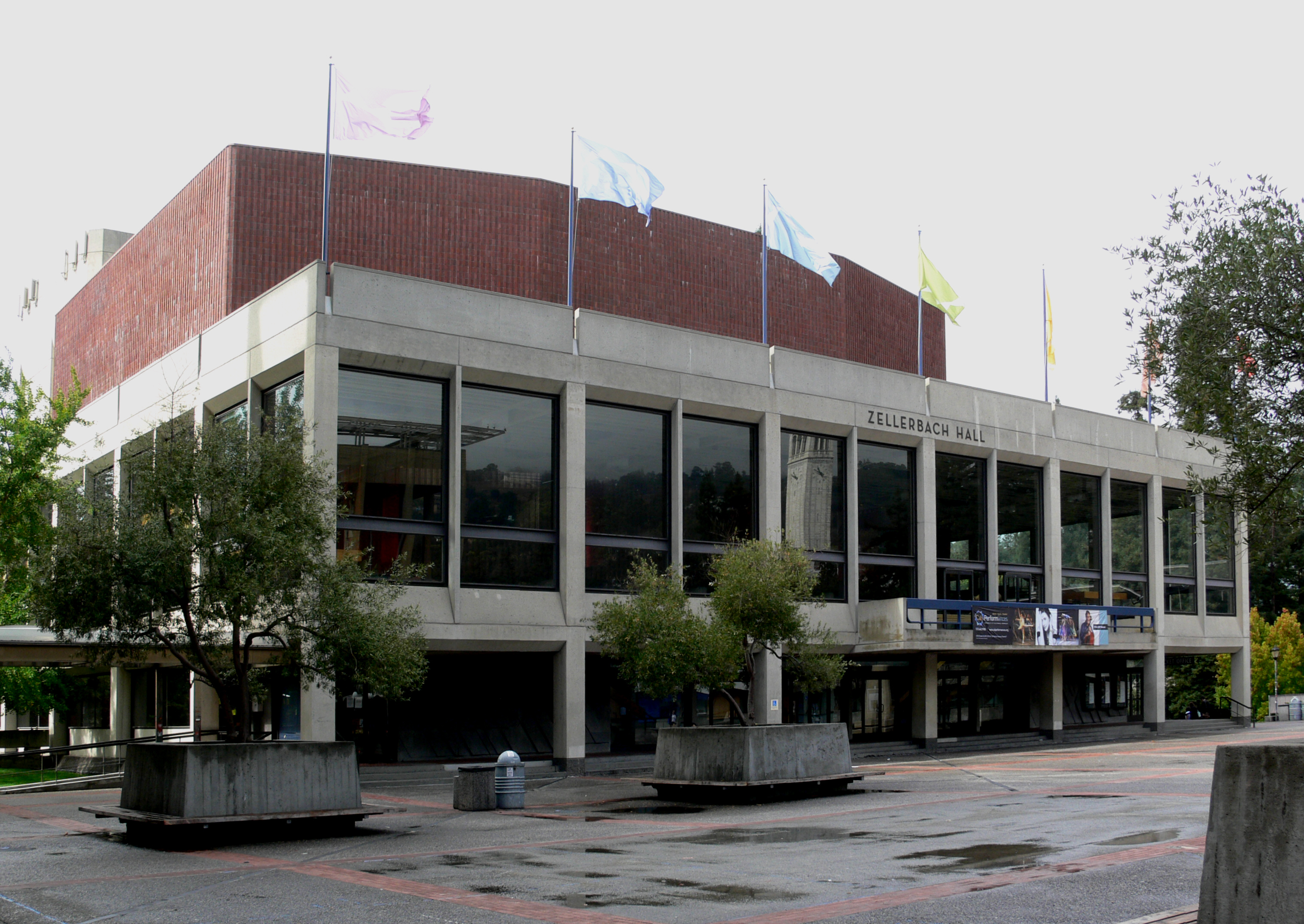
- Interactive map of Zellerbach Hall
- Location: Berkeley, California
- Owner: University of California, Berkeley
- Capacity: Auditorium: 1,984; Playhouse: 500

Construction
- Opened: 1968

Website
- www.calperformances.org

Zellerbach Hall is a multi-venue performance facility on the campus of the University of California, Berkeley, west of Lower Sproul Plaza. It was designed by architect and professor Vernon DeMars and completed in 1968. The facility consists of two primary performance spaces: the 1,984-seat Zellerbach Auditorium, and the 500-seat Zellerbach Playhouse.

Zellerbach Auditorium is the main performance venue for Cal Performances, a presenting and producing arts organization. The facility is suitable for dance, theater, and opera, and has a built-in concert shell that provides an excellent acoustical enclosure for symphonic and other classical music performances.

The Playhouse is primarily used by the UC Berkeley Department of Theater and Dance. It features flexible seating sections to allow for different configurations of the seating and performance spaces.

Zellerbach Hall was named in honor of Isadore and Jennie Zellerbach, after a $1 million gift was given toward completion of the facility.

Christine McVie of Fleetwood Mac recorded the song "Songbird" (from the album Rumours) at Zellerbach Hall in 1976.

In May 1998, the game show Jeopardy! held their annual College Championship at Zellerbach Hall.

== See also ==
- Sproul Plaza

Preceded by Sony Pictures Studios	Host of the Jeopardy! College Championship; 1998	Succeeded by Rosemont Theater
