= Mario Savio =

American activist (1942–1996)

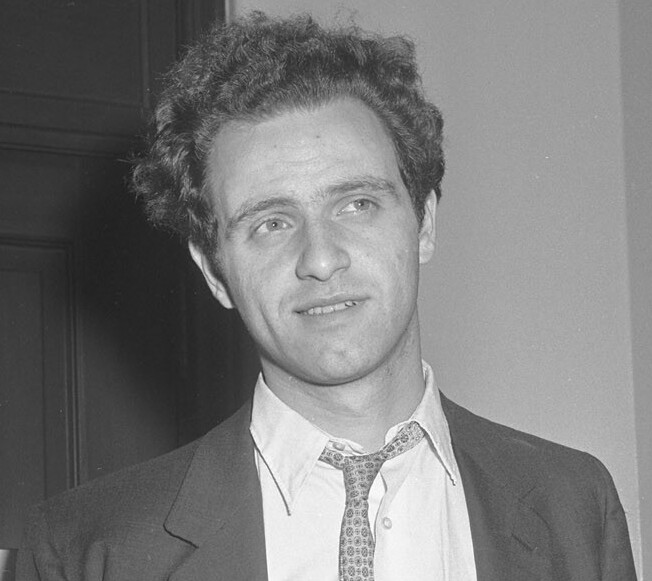
- Savio in 1965
- Born: December 8, 1942; New York City, New York, U.S.
- Died: November 6, 1996 (aged 53); Sebastopol, California, U.S.
- Education: University of California, Berkeley; Queens College; San Francisco State University
- Occupation: Activist
- Known for: "Bodies Upon the Gears"
- Spouse(s): Suzanne Goldberg (1965–1972); Lynne Hollander (m. 1980)

Mario Savio (December 8, 1942 – November 6, 1996) was an American activist and a key member of the Berkeley Free Speech Movement. He is most famous for his passionate speeches, especially the "Bodies Upon the Gears" address given at Sproul Hall, University of California, Berkeley on December 2, 1964.

Savio remains historically relevant as an icon of the earliest phase of the 1960s counterculture movement.

== Early life ==
Savio was born in New York City to an Italian father originally from Caltanissetta and an Italian mother originally from Veneto.

He graduated from Martin Van Buren High School in Queens at the top of his class in 1960. He went to Manhattan College on a full scholarship, and to Queens College. When he finished in 1963, he spent the summer working with a Catholic relief organization in Taxco, Mexico helping to improve the sanitary problems by building facilities in the slums.

His parents had moved to Los Angeles and in late 1963, he enrolled at the University of California, Berkeley. In March 1964, he was arrested while demonstrating against the San Francisco Hotel Association for excluding black people from non-menial jobs. He was charged with trespassing, along with 167 other protesters. While in jail, a cellmate asked if he was heading for Mississippi that summer to help with the Civil Rights project.

== Activism ==
In mid-1964, he joined the Freedom Summer projects in Mississippi and was involved in helping African Americans register to vote. He also taught at a freedom school for black children in McComb, Mississippi. In July, Savio, another white civil-rights activist and a black acquaintance were walking down a road in Jackson and were attacked by two men. They filed a police report where the Federal Bureau of Investigation (FBI) became involved. However, the case stalled until President Lyndon Johnson, who had recently signed the Civil Rights Act, allowed the FBI to look into it as a civil-rights violation. Eventually one of the attackers was found, charged with misdemeanor assault and fined $50.

After Savio participated in these protests, he was inspired to fight further against the injustices he had witnessed. He came to see the violence and racism of the American South as the visible facet of an overall structure of nationwide socioeconomic hegemony. When Savio returned to Berkeley after his time in Mississippi, he intended to raise money for the Student Nonviolent Coordinating Committee, but found that the university had banned all political activity and fundraising. He told Karlyn Barker in 1964 that it was a question as to whose side one was on. "Are we on the side of the civil rights movement? Or have we gotten back to the comfort and security of Berkeley, California, and can we forget the sharecroppers whom we worked with just a few weeks back? Well, we couldn't forget."

Savio's part in the protest on the Berkeley campus started on October 1, 1964, when former graduate student Jack Weinberg was staffing a table for the Congress of Racial Equality (CORE). The university police arrested Weinberg when he refused to provide identification, and just as they put him into a police car someone from the surrounding crowd yelled, “We can all see better if we sit down.” Soon those in front of and behind the police car starting sitting as the call "sit down" echoed through the crowd, trapping the car in the plaza. Savio, along with others during the 32-hour sit-in, climbed on top of the police car (after taking off his shoes, to avoid scratching the paint on the car), and spoke with words that roused the crowd into a frenzy.

The last time he climbed on the police car was to tell the crowd of a short-term understanding that had been reached with UC President Clark Kerr. Savio said to the crowd, "I ask you to rise quietly and with dignity and go home." Savio became the prominent leader of the newly formed Free Speech Movement. Negotiations failed to change the situation; therefore direct action began in Sproul Hall on December 2. There, Savio gave his most famous speech, "Bodies Upon the Gears," in front of 4,000 people. He and 800 others were arrested that day. In 1967, he was sentenced to 120 days at Santa Rita Jail. He told reporters that he "would do it again."

In April 1965, he quit the FSM because "he was disappointed with the growing gap between the leadership of the FSM ... and the students themselves."

=== "Bodies Upon the Gears" speech ===
Also known as "Operation of the Machine", this speech is possibly Savio's best-known work. He spoke on the steps of Sproul Hall, on December 2, 1964:

We were told the following: If President Kerr actually tried to get something more liberal out of the regents in his telephone conversation, why didn't he make some public statement to that effect? And the answer we received, from a well-meaning liberal, was the following: He said, 'Would you ever imagine the manager of a firm making a statement publicly in opposition to his board of directors?' That's the answer!

Well, I ask you to consider: If this is a firm, and if the board of regents are the board of directors; and if President Kerr in fact is the manager; then I'll tell you something. The faculty are a bunch of employees, and we're the raw material! But we're a bunch of raw materials that don't mean to be—have any process upon us. Don't mean to be made into any product. Don't mean ... Don't mean to end up being bought by some clients of the University, be they the government, be they industry, be they organized labor, be they anyone! We're human beings!

There is a time when the operation of the machine becomes so odious, makes you so sick at heart, that you can't take part! You can't even passively take part! And you've got to put your bodies upon the gears and upon the wheels ... upon the levers, upon all the apparatus, and you've got to make it stop! And you've got to indicate to the people who run it, to the people who own it, that unless you're free, the machine will be prevented from working at all!

=== FBI surveillance ===
In 1999, the media revealed that Savio had been tailed by the FBI from the moment he climbed onto the police car in which Jack Weinberg was detained. He was followed for more than a decade because he had emerged as the nation's most prominent student leader. To avoid harassing phone calls, Savio was in the habit of listing himself in the telephone book under aliases such as José Martí, Wallace Stevens, and David Bohm, and the FBI recorded that as well. There was no evidence to suggest that Savio was a national security risk, or that he had a connection with the Communist Party USA, but the FBI decided he merited their attention because they thought he could inspire students to rebel.

Even after he left the FSM, the FBI called him to their Berkeley office. They told Savio they had received letters of a threatening nature towards him, but they would not speak while his attorney was present. However, Savio would not agree to being alone with the agents, and instead criticized the FBI "for failure to make arrests and take action in the South where human rights are being violated every day". At this point, the meeting ended.

According to hundreds of pages of FBI files, the bureau:

- Collected, without court order, personal information about Savio from schools, telephone companies, utility firms, and banks and compiled information about his marriage and divorce.
- Monitored his day-to-day activities by using informants planted in political groups, covertly contacting his neighbors, landlords and employers, and having agents pose as professors, journalists, and activists to interview him and his wife.
- Obtained his tax returns from the Internal Revenue Service in violation of federal rules, mischaracterized him as a threat to the president and arranged for the Central Intelligence Agency (CIA) and foreign intelligence agencies to investigate him when he and his family traveled in Europe.
- Put him on an unauthorized list of people to be detained without judicial warrant in the event of a national emergency and designated him as a "Key Activist" whose political activities should be "disrupted" and "neutralized" under the bureau's illegal counterintelligence program known as COINTELPRO.

The FBI's Savio investigation finally ended at the beginning of 1975, when an investigation into the FBI's abuse of power began. Savio's ex-wife, Suzanne Goldberg, said that the "FBI's investigation of her and Savio [was] a waste of money and an invasion of privacy".

== Physics, teaching career, and death ==
Between 1965 and his death, Savio held a variety of jobs, including as a salesclerk in Berkeley and instructor at Sonoma State University. In 1965, he married Suzanne Goldberg, whom he had met in the Free Speech Movement. Two months after their wedding, they moved to England because Savio won a scholarship to the University of Oxford. While there, they had their first child, Stefan. Savio did not complete his degree at Oxford, and they moved back to California in February 1966. In 1968, he ran for state senator from Alameda County on the Peace and Freedom Party ticket, but lost to Nicholas C. Petris, a liberal Democrat.

In April 1970 the Savios had their second son, Nadav, but filed for divorce soon after (April 1972), citing irreconcilable differences. After that, he entered a period of severe emotional troubles. According to his friend Jackie Goldberg (a former FSM leader, and not related to his wife), Savio showed up homeless on her doorstep, and she found him in a "very bad emotional state." Savio was suffering from depression, and in February 1973 the FBI was told he had been hospitalized at the UCLA Medical Center.

In 1980 he married a second time, to Lynne Hollander, an old acquaintance from the Free Speech Movement. He returned to study at San Francisco State University soon thereafter. In 1984, he received a summa cum laude bachelor's degree in physics and earned a master's degree in 1989. Savio was a good student and had a theorem named after him by a professor. In 1990, Savio and Hollander moved with their ten-year-old son to Sonoma County, California, where Savio taught mathematics, philosophy, and logic at Sonoma State University. Although Savio generally kept a low profile on campus, he joined students to protest a rise in student fees.

Savio had a history of heart problems and the day following a bitter and extended public debate with Sonoma State University's then-president, Ruben Armiñana, Savio had a heart attack. He was admitted to Columbia-Palm Drive Hospital in Sebastopol, California, on November 2, 1996. He slipped into a coma on November 5 and died the following day, shortly after being removed from life support.

== Legacy ==
A Memorial Lecture Fund was set up to honor Mario Savio upon his death. The Mario Savio Memorial Lecture Fund hosts an annual lecture on the University of California, Berkeley campus. Past lecturers include Howard Zinn, Winona LaDuke, Lani Guinier, Barbara Ehrenreich, Arlie Russell Hochschild, Cornel West, Christopher Hitchens, Adam Hochschild, Amy Goodman, Molly Ivins, Jeff Chang, Tom Hayden, Angela Davis, Seymour Hersh, Robert F. Kennedy, Jr., Naomi Klein, Elizabeth Warren, Robert Reich, and Van Jones.

The Memorial Fund also set up the Mario Savio Young Activist Award to honor an outstanding young activist with a deep commitment to human rights and social justice and the qualities of leadership ability, creativity, and integrity.

In 1997, the steps of Sproul Plaza, from which he had given his most famous speech, were officially renamed the "Mario Savio Steps". The Free Speech Movement Cafe on the Berkeley campus honors him.

On October 9, 2010, the American rock band Linkin Park released the song "Wretches and Kings," as a promotional single off their fourth studio album A Thousand Suns. The song features two excerpts at the beginning and end from Savio's "bodies upon the gears" speech.

On March 12, 2011, at the end of an announcement by hacktivist group Anonymous of an attack, called the Empire State Rebellion, on the Federal Reserve, the International Monetary Fund, the Bank of International Settlements and the World Bank, an excerpt of Savio's speech was included. Since the onset of the Occupy movement in the United States in late 2011, Savio's speech and his activism have been cited many times.

On October 16, 2012, the Sebastopol City Council rededicated the Downtown Plaza as the "Mario Savio Free Speech Plaza". On November 15, 2012, the "Mario Savio Speakers' Corner" was dedicated on the campus of Sonoma State University. At the ceremony, Lynne Hollander Savio told the audience, "I hope you will use this free speech corner often, to advocate and organize with dignity and responsibility for the causes you believe in."

Footage of Mario Savio is prominently featured in the 1990 documentary film Berkeley in the Sixties.
