= Sproul Plaza =

Collection of buildings at the University of California, Berkeley

Coordinates: 37.869597°N 122.258850°W

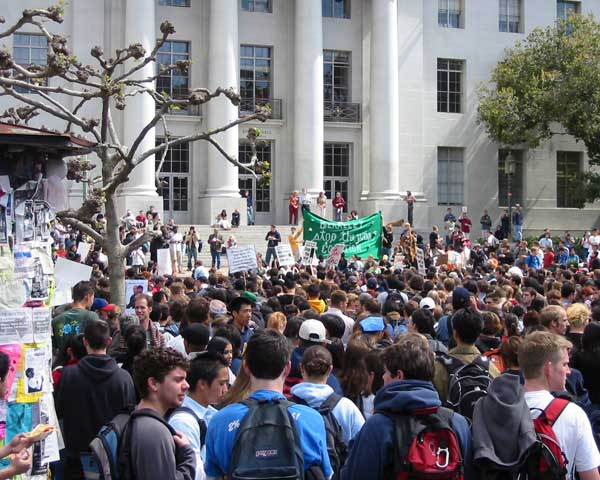
A March 20, 2003 rally against the War in Iraq on the steps of Sproul Plaza, held by the Berkeley Stop the War Coalition

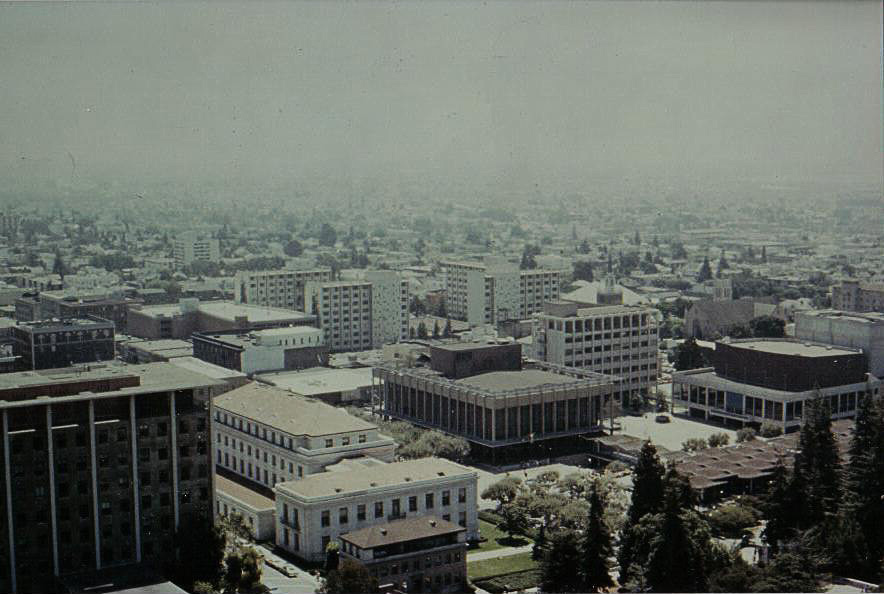
Aerial view of Sproul Plaza from 1978. Zellerbach Hall is on the right, Eshleman Hall in the center, and Sproul Hall is center-left. The student union and Sather Gate are visible in the lower-right corner.

Sproul Plaza is one center of student activity at the University of California, Berkeley. It is divided into two sections: Upper Sproul and Lower Sproul. They are vertically separated by twelve feet (3.7 m) and linked by a set of stairs.

== History ==
Sproul Plaza as well as Sproul Hall are named for the last (1930–1952) University of California, Berkeley president, Robert Gordon Sproul. The Plaza was designed by landscape architect Lawrence Halprin in 1962. At the time, the university was expanding its core campus southward from its prior border at Strawberry Creek to Bancroft Avenue, and acquired acres of commercial and residential properties in the south campus Telegraph Avenue area.

== Upper Sproul ==
Upper Sproul Plaza is bordered to the east by Sproul Hall, which was formerly the location of the campus administration, and is today the location of student and admission services. To the north is Sather Gate, which leads into the central campus, and to the south are Telegraph Avenue and the South Campus area of Berkeley. Sproul Hall is situated on a rise above Upper Sproul Plaza and features a broad, terraced stairway leading to the entrance. Large numbers of students walk past Sproul Hall on their way to class or Telegraph Avenue.

The combination of a stairway that can be used as a large raised platform and a ready audience makes Upper Sproul Plaza a popular location for student protests, the first of which occurred in 1964 during the Free Speech Movement, when Mario Savio spoke from the Sproul Hall steps, and folk singer Joan Baez gave an early performance. A small round brass marker, embedded in the concrete, declares them as the "Mario Savio Steps". Upper Sproul Plaza was also the site of early teach-ins and protests against the Vietnam War, the 1969 tear-gassing of People's Park protesters by the National Guard, 1985–86 protests against University investment in apartheid-era South Africa, and many other political events. In 2011, Sproul Plaza was the site of Occupy Berkeley protests.

During calmer times, numerous student groups set up tables to recruit and inform other students (a practice known as "tabling", as occurs at many universities throughout the United States). Upper Sproul Plaza also features a double row of the pollarded London plane trees characteristic of the Berkeley campus. On the first Tuesday of each month from 12–1 p.m. during the fall and spring semesters, there is a "Pet Hugs" therapy dog event to provide stress relief to students.

== Lower Sproul ==
Lower Sproul Plaza, directly west of Upper Sproul Plaza, is the location of numerous small musical and cultural performances and is surrounded by numerous brutalist-style 1960s-era buildings owned by the ASUC, including the Martin Luther King Jr. Student Union to the east, as well as the César E. Chávez Student Center to the north and Zellerbach Hall to the west. Lower Sproul connects to the Haas Pavilion and Recreational Sports Facility to the west. The Chávez Student Center combined forces with artist-activist Emmy Lou Packard to create the 85-foot long, 5-foot high, Modernist, bas-relief mural in the center of the Plaza. Packard's mural is depicting California landscape features, including coastal bluffs, cultivated fields, mountains, and rivers.

Eshleman Hall, a 1960s-era building which housed the ASUC (Associated Students of the University of California) Senate, was demolished in summer 2013, after being rated "seismically very poor". It has since been replaced by a new building of the same name. More than 50% of the Lower Sproul Redevelopment Project was funded by the BEARS student fee initiative, passed by student referendum in spring 2010, with the rest provided by Life and Campus Services. Eshleman Hall now houses the ASUC and Graduate Assembly (GA) offices, Registered Student Organization co-working space, Senate Chambers, Public Service Center, LEAD Center, Student Technology Services Helpdesk, meetings rooms, and the Bear's Lair pub.

The Martin Luther King Jr. Building is home to the Campus Living Room, Pauley Ballroom, Cal Student Store, Berkeley Art Studio, Multicultural Community Center, Creative Lab, a coffee shop, a food hall, and many student-run services such as BicyCal, Blue & God Yearbook, SUPERB, ReUse, Open Computing Facility, and more. The Basement of the Martin Luther King Jr. Building houses the Basic Needs Center, including the Food Pantry, Student Environmental Resource Center, BWell, and an extension of the Student Parents Center. The César E. Chávez Student Center houses the Student Learning Center and the Golden Bear Café. Zellerbach Hall is the largest indoor performance auditorium on campus, and frequently hosts guest speakers as well as Cal Performances engagements.

== Popular culture ==
- Sproul Plaza is referenced in the song "Sad but True" by The Transplants. Vocalist Tim Armstrong is a Berkeley native.
