= Vietnam Day Committee =

The Vietnam Day Committee (VDC) was a coalition of left-wing political groups, student groups, labour organizations, and pacifist religions in the United States of America that opposed the Vietnam War during the counterculture era. It was formed in Berkeley, California in the spring of 1965 by activist Jerry Rubin, and was active through the majority of the Vietnam war, organizing several rallies and marches in California as well as coordinating and sponsoring nationwide protests.

== Activities ==
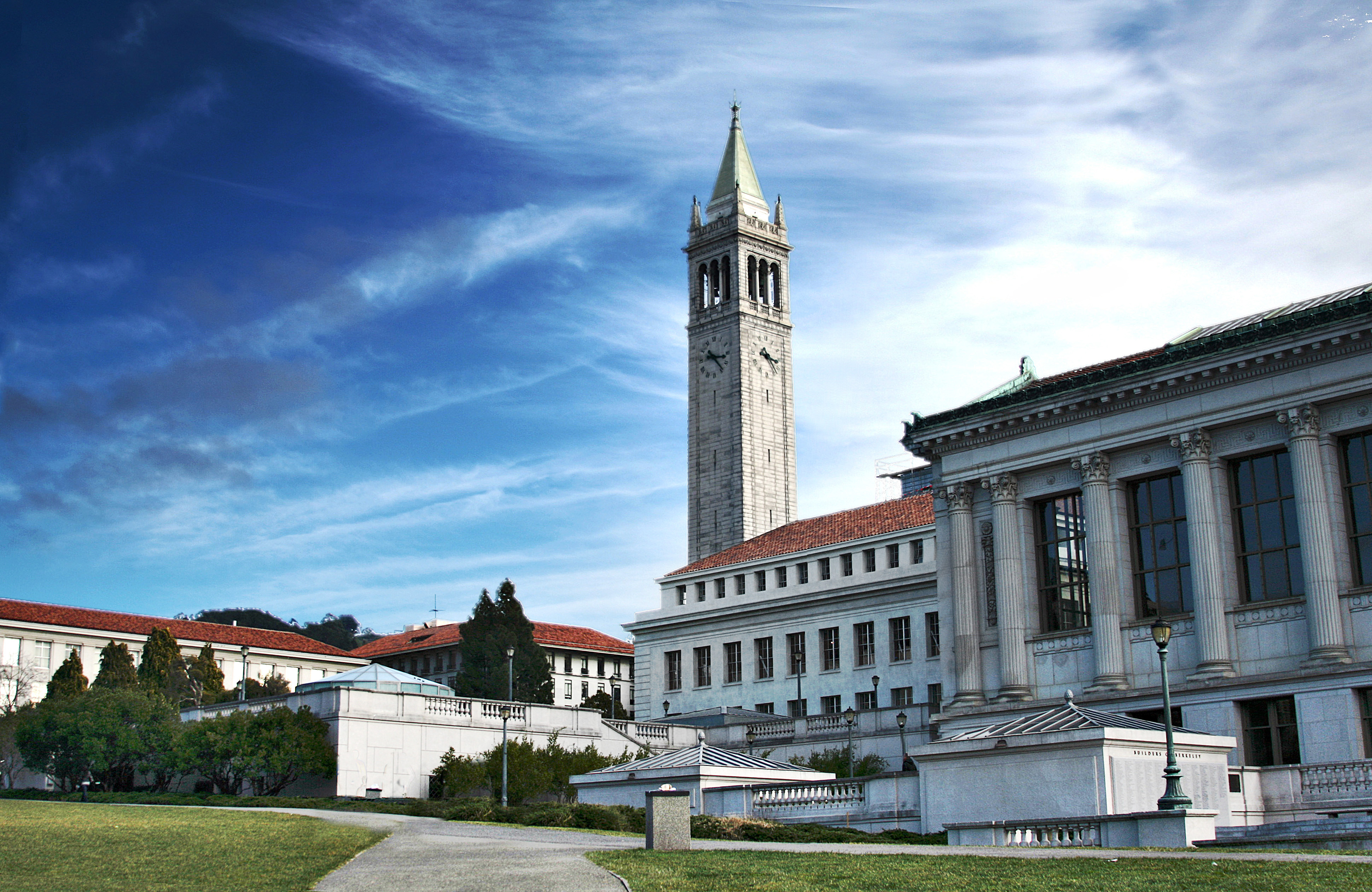
Berkeley campus of the University of California where much of the VDC's actions took place or were organized

The VDC was formed by Jerry Rubin and Stephen Smale between May 21 and May 22, 1965 during a 35‑hour‑long anti-Vietnam war protest that took place inside and around the University of California, Berkeley and attracted over 35,000 people, including Paul Montauk and Stew Albert. The VDC laid out three main objectives: to achieve national and international solidarity and coordination on action, to take part in militant action, including civil disobedience and to work extensively in the community to develop the movement outside of the university campus. Attending the event were several notable anti-war activists, including Dr. Benjamin Spock, however the State Department declined to send a representative, despite the burning of an effigy of president Lyndon Johnson.

On May 5, 1965, the VDC was involved in a march of several hundred students from campus to the Berkeley Draft Board, where the staff was given a black coffin, and students burned their draft cards.

Later that year, the VDC planned a nationwide protest, the International Days of Protest Against American Military Intervention, which was scheduled between October 15 and October 16. In arranging and coordinating the protest movement, the VDC headquarters in Berkeley communicated with anti-war groups in New York City, Boston, New Haven, Philadelphia, Pittsburgh, Detroit, Ann Arbor, Chicago, Madison, Milwaukee, Minneapolis, Los Angeles, Portland and Atlanta. The planned movement attracted attention from some newspapers like the National Guardian:

Preparations are being made in about two dozen American cities for coordinated mass protests Oct. 15-16 in opposition to U.S. aggression in Vietnam. Advance information indicates that demonstrations may surpass previous anti-war protests not only in total numbers and intensity of action, but in long-range benefit to the peace movement, for the emphasis of the "national days of protest" is on community organization and education as well as on direct action against the war.

Similar groups began to form outside California, notably in Mexico City and Tokyo. In California, the International Days of Protest were to culminate with a peace march toward the Oakland Army Terminal, where men and materials were sent to Vietnam. On October 15, 1965, the protests took place across the country, with the VDC itself organising a sit-in at San Francisco State College, which saw a performance by Country Joe and the Fish.

The VDC organized another peace march which took place on November 21, 1965, and saw over 10,000 people marching through Oakland. The march was the first of its kind in California and was one of many orchestrated by the VDC from 1965 through 1972; a number of pro-war protesters lined the route holding signs that said, "Stamp out VDC".

By this time, the activities of the VDC had attracted the interest of the California Senate Factfinding Subcommittee on Un-American Activities.

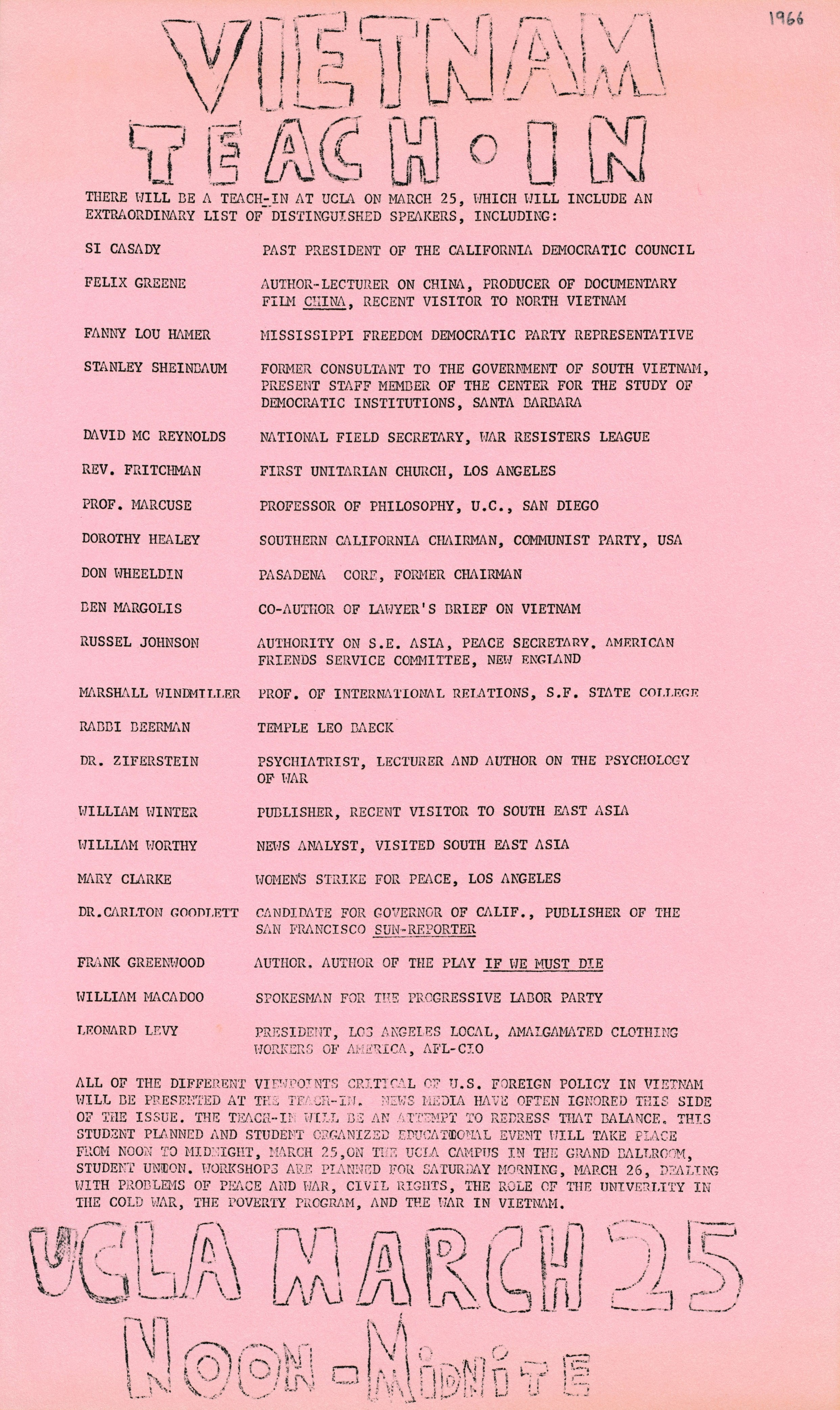
UCLA Vietnam Day Committee leaflet promoting its 25 March 1966 antiwar teach-in

On March 25, 1966, the UCLA VDC, a group not organizationally tied to the Berkeley VDC, sponsored a well-attended, 12-hour 'teach-in' at UCLA. This clashed with a small rally that supported America's involvement in Vietnam. The antiwar event had a number of guest speakers, including Simon Casady, a former president of the California Democratic Council, Dorothy Healy, the Southern California chairman of the Communist Party USA, and the British philosopher Bertrand Russell.

== See also ==
- List of anti-war organizations
- List of peace activists
