= Bettina Aptheker =

American political activist, radical feminist, professor, and author

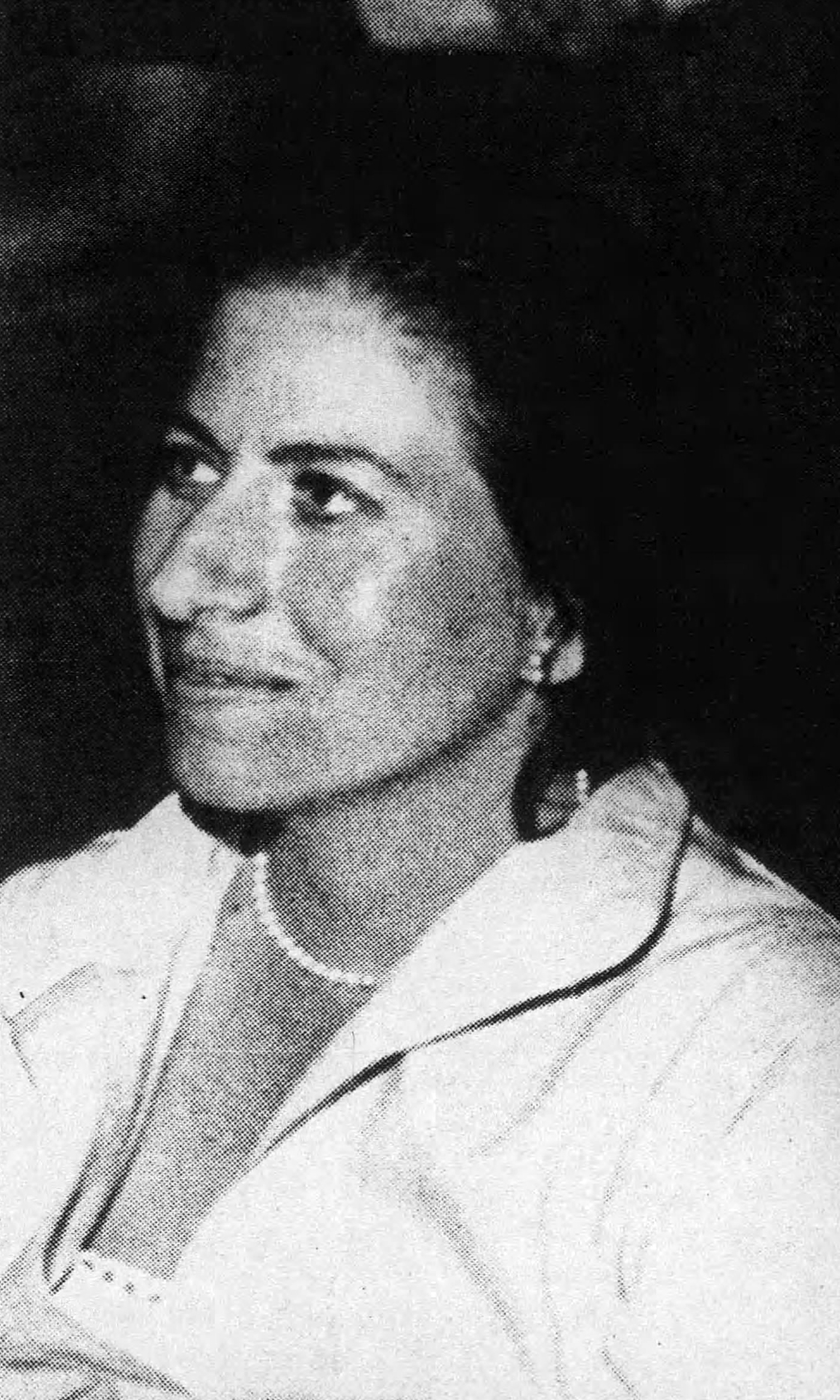
- Aptheker in 1975
- Born: September 2, 1944 (age 82); Fort Bragg, North Carolina, U.S.
- Education: University of California, Berkeley; San Jose State University; University of California, Santa Cruz
- Occupations: Activist, educator, author,
- Spouses: Jack Kurzweil (m. 1965–1978): Kate Miller
- Children: 2
- Parent(s): Herbert and Fay Aptheker

Bettina Fay Aptheker (born September 2, 1944) is an American political activist, radical feminist, professor and author. Aptheker was active in civil rights and anti-war movements of the 1960s and 1970s, and has since worked in developing feminist studies.

== Biography ==
=== Early years and education ===
Aptheker was born in Fort Bragg, North Carolina, to a Jewish family, Fay Philippa Aptheker and Herbert Aptheker, first cousins who had married in Brooklyn. Both parents were political activists; her mother, who had been married before and was ten years older than her husband, was a union organizer. Her father was a Marxist historian, whose first book about slave revolts overturned previous conceptions of enslaved African Americans. He was a major figure in changing the writing of African American history. Bettina was raised in Brooklyn, New York, where her Jewish parents, children of immigrants, had grown up. Her first job as a teenager was in the home of W.E.B. Du Bois, who was a good friend of her father.

Aptheker obtained her undergraduate degree in history from the University of California, Berkeley. She was an activist in the W.E.B. Du Bois Club, a national youth organization sponsored by the Communist Party USA, and was involved in the Berkeley Free Speech Movement during the fall of 1964.

Ten years later, she partially retired from political activism and returned to academia for graduate work. In 1976, she completed her master's degree in communications at San José State University, and started teaching there.

=== Political career ===
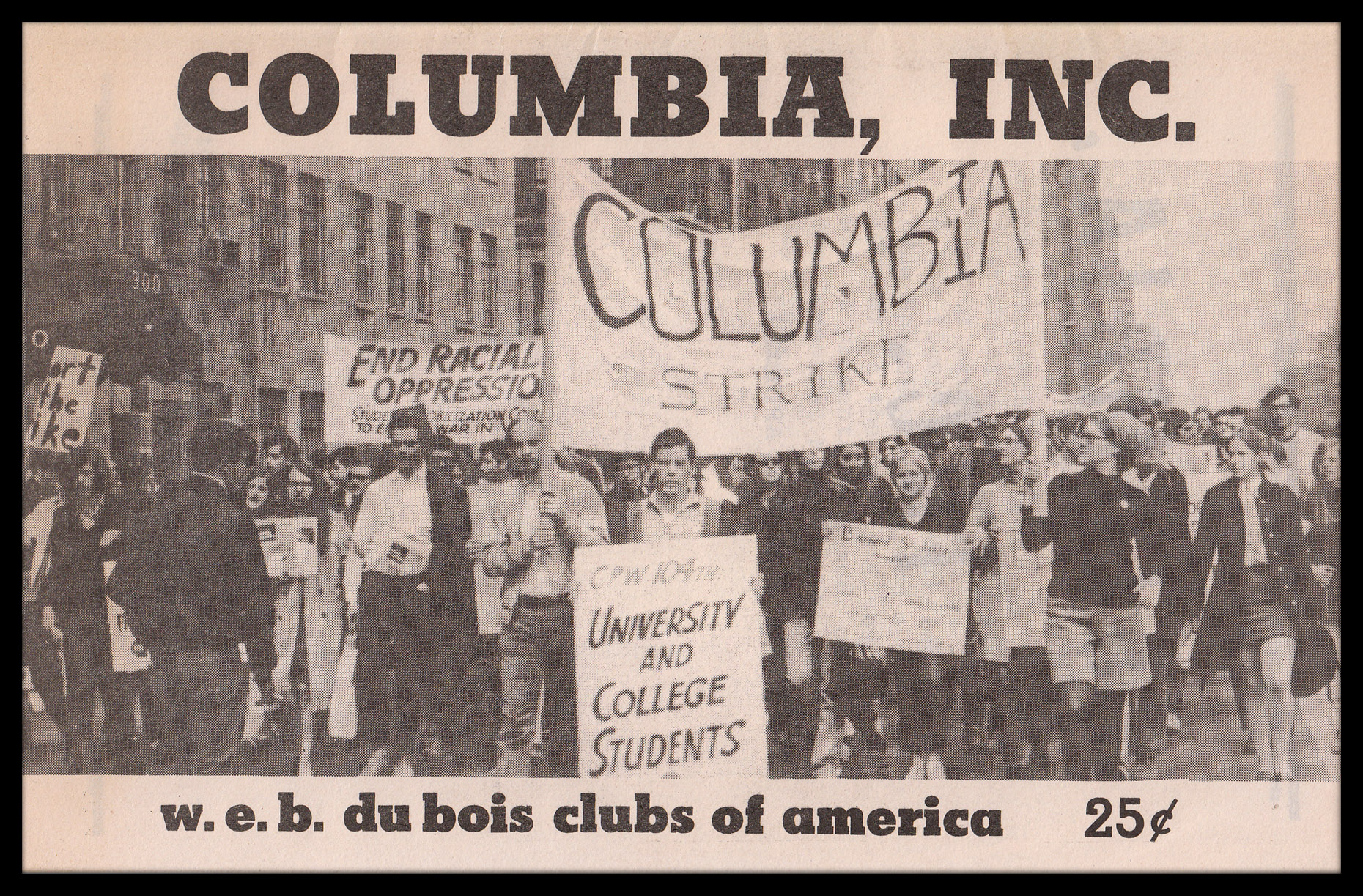
Cover of Aptheker's May 1968 pamphlet, Columbia Inc.

Aptheker was a delegate to the June 1964 founding convention of the W.E.B. DuBois Clubs, a Communist Party-sponsored youth organization, held in San Francisco.

She rose in influence to become a member of the governing National Committee of the CPUSA. She was remembered by the California party leader Dorothy Healey in her 1990 memoir as "one of the liveliest of the young people who rose to prominence in the party in the 1960s, and also one of the warmest human beings I've ever met."

In 1968, the Soviet invasion of Czechoslovakia divided the 120-member leadership of the CPUSA. All but three of the National Committee, headed by party leader Gus Hall, backed the intervention of Soviet tanks. A meeting of the National Committee held over the Labor Day weekend backed Hall by a margin of five-to-one. Bettina Aptheker denounced the invasion, however, and voted with the minority; she opposed her father Herbert Aptheker over this issue. One of the CPUSA's leading intellectuals, he and a majority of its leaders had defended the Soviet intervention in Hungary in 1956.

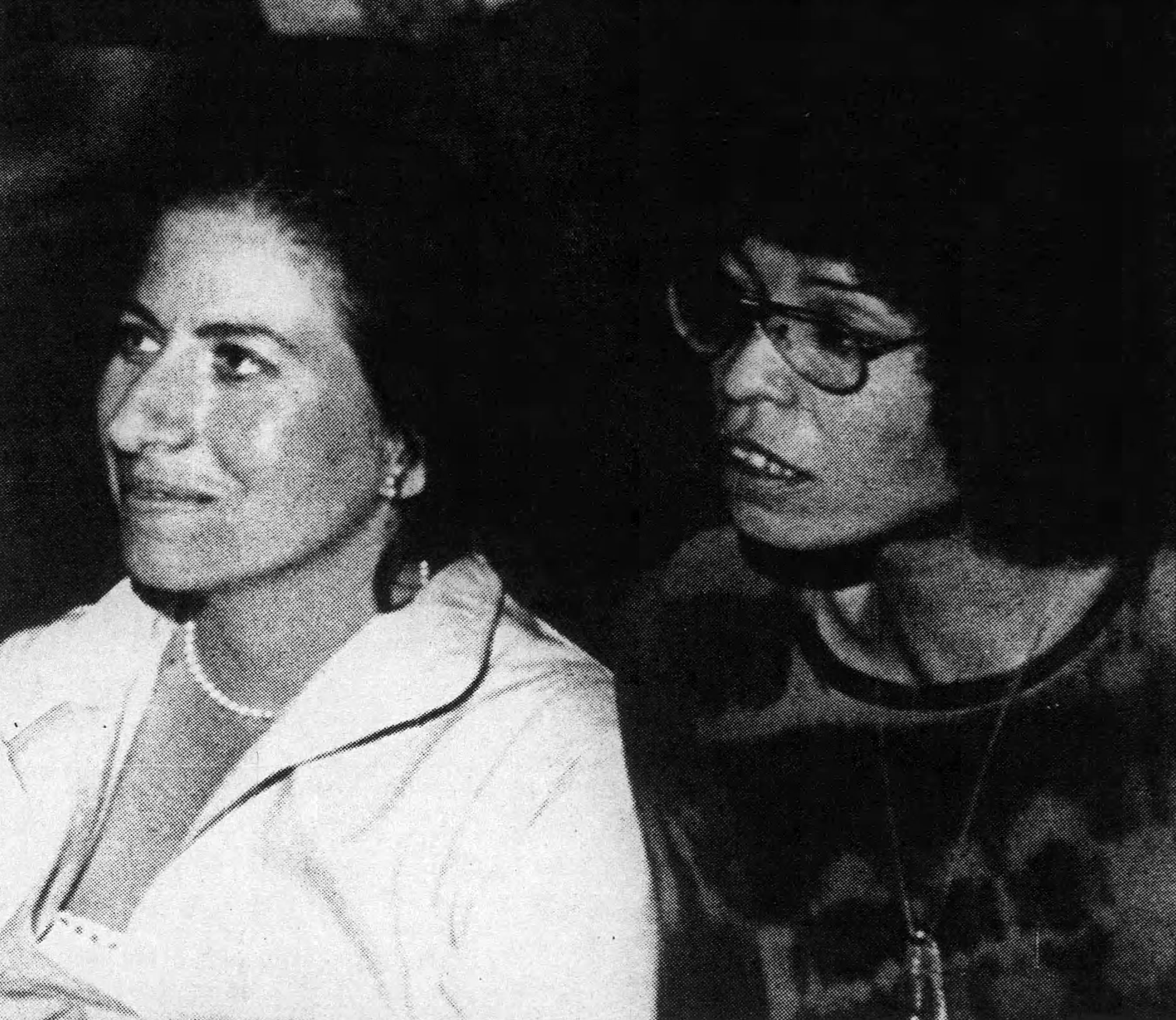
Aptheker with Angela Davis, May 7, 1975

During the 1970s, Aptheker worked for the defense in the high-profile trial of Angela Davis, a long-time friend and fellow Communist Party member accused of involvement in George Jackson's attempt to escape from jail. She also wrote a book about the trial, which was published in 1974. In 1977, she became an associate of the Women's Institute for Freedom of the Press (WIFP). WIFP is an American nonprofit publishing organization. The organization works to increase communication between women and connect the public with forms of women-based media.

=== Academic career ===
After completing her master's degree, Aptheker taught African-American and Women's Studies at San José State University. In the early 1980s, she completed a doctorate in the History of Consciousness program at the University of California, Santa Cruz. Since 1980, she has taught in the Feminist Studies department there.

=== Marriage and family ===
In 1965 Aptheker married her fellow student Jack Kurzweil, who was also a Communist activist. They divorced in 1978 after having two children together. Since October 1979, Aptheker has been with Kate Miller, her life partner. They have three children between them, as each woman had children in her first marriage.

== Memoir and abuse by father ==
In her memoir, Intimate Politics, (2006), she wrote about growing up in a leftist household, as what was called a "Red Diaper Baby." She was strongly influenced in her activism by that of her parents. She also commented on her father's scholarship. In addition to his commitment to the cause of justice for African Americans, she believed her father celebrated black resistance under slavery as an attempt "to compensate for his deep shame about the way, he believed, the Jews had acted during the Holocaust."

Her memoir reported that her father had sexually molested her from when she was 3 to age 13. In an opinion column written after her book was reviewed, Aptheker said she had earlier kept silent to shield her family. Memories began to arise in 1999, after her mother's death and when she began writing the memoir. When her father asked, "Did I ever hurt you as a child?," she responded "yes" and explained the emotional effects of his treatment. He expressed anguish and sorrow, and they eventually reconciled. With counseling, she found she had suffered dissociation when young, as at the time her family was under great stress during the McCarthy years. Bettina Aptheker stressed her compassion for her father.

Her assertion generated considerable controversy in the academic community because of her father's stature as a scholar and Communist. Numerous letters were published in The Chronicle of Higher Education, which had reviewed her book, and on the History News Network of George Mason University. Some historians wondered how this news affected people's perceptions of Herbert Aptheker's work. Others questioned Bettina Aptheker's credibility, classing her account in stories of "recovered memory". The historian Mark Rosenzweig wrote, "the truth about Herbert and Bettina is inaccessible to us." The historian Jesse Lemisch wrote in his second essay about the controversy, "Shhh! Don't Talk about Herbert Aptheker":

"... a general public silence by Old Leftists in response to the report of Herbert Aptheker's sexual molestation of his daughter Bettina may be writing another chapter in the strange history of American Communism. Fellow Red Diaper Babies and many former Communists seem to want to sweep this under the rug — or, may I say, airbrush it — as if there had never been a Women's Liberation Movement, and it had never occurred to anybody that there might be a connection between the personal and the political ..."

The controversy continued for months. In November 2007, historian Christopher Phelps published an overview in The Nation magazine. He included the results of an interview with Kate Miller, who had been present during Aptheker's 1999 conversation with her father about the abuse, and confirmed her account.

== Works ==
=== Books ===
- Big Business and the American University. New York: New Outlook Publishers, 1966.
- Columbia Inc. New York: W.E.B. DuBois Clubs of America, May 1968.
- Racism and Reaction in the United States: Two Marxian Studies. With Herbert Aptheker. New York: New Outlook Publishers, 1971.
- The Morning Breaks: The Trial of Angela Davis. Ithaca, NY: Cornell University Press, 1976 ISBN 9780801485978
- The Unfolding Drama: Studies in U.S. History. With Herbert Aptheker. New York: International Publishers, 1979.
- Woman's Legacy: Essays on Race, Sex and Class in American History. Amherst, MA: University of Massachusetts Press, 1982 ISBN 9780870233654
- Tapestries of Life: Women's Work, Women's Consciousness and the Meaning of Daily Life. Amherst, MA: University of Massachusetts Press, 1989 ISBN 9780870236594
- Aptheker, Bettina (September 26, 2006). Intimate Politics: How I Grew Up Red, Fought for Free Speech, and Became a Feminist Rebel. Seal Press. ISBN 978-1-58005-160-6.
- Communists in Closets: Queering the History 1930s-1990s. Routledge, September 2022 ISBN 9781032035840

=== Book chapters and articles ===
- "Toni Cade Bambara: A Political Life of the Spirit", in Linda J. Holmes and Cheryl A. Wall, editors, Savoring the Salt: The Legacy of Toni Cade Bambara, Temple University Press, 2008. pp. 226–235.
- "Keeping the Communist Party Straight, 1940s-1980s", New Politics, Summer 2008, Vol.XII, No. 1, pp. 22–27.
- "Teaching about Anti-Semitism and the Legacy of Jewish Women". Women's Studies Quarterly, vol. 21, no. 3/4, 1993, pp. 63–68.
- "Race and Class: Patriarchal Politics and Women's Experience". Women's Studies Quarterly, vol. 10, no. 4, 1982, pp. 10–15.
- "'Strong Is What We Make Each Other': Unlearning Racism within Women's Studies". Women's Studies Quarterly, vol. 9, no. 4, 1981, pp. 13–16.

== Awards and honors ==
Aptheker received the 2004 "Award for Excellence in Education" by the California chapter of the National Organization for Women (CA NOW). In 2012, she was co-appointment with Karen Yamashita to the UC Presidential Chair in Feminist Critical Race and Ethnic Studies; a position offered to distinguished members of the university's faculty intended to encourage new or interdisciplinary program development. She received the 2017 John Dizikes Teaching Award in Humanities and the inaugural appointee of the endowed Peggy and Jack Baskin Foundation Presidential Chair for Feminist Studies.
