= Anatol Rapoport =

Russian-born American mathematical psychologist (1911–2007)

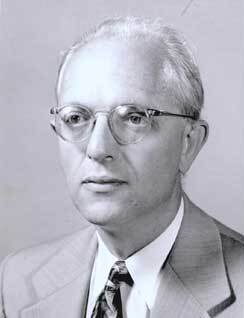
- Born: 22 May 1911; Lozova, Russia (now Ukraine)
- Died: 20 January 2007 (aged 95); Toronto, Canada
- Education: Hochschule für Musik, Vienna, University of Chicago
- Known for: Game theory
- Awards: Lentz International Peace Research Prize
- Scientific career
- Fields: Mathematical psychology
- Workplaces: University of Chicago, University of Michigan, University of Toronto, Institute for Advanced Studies (Vienna)
- Thesis: Construction of Non-Abelian Fields with Prescribed Arithmetic
- Doctoral advisors: Otto Schilling, Abraham Adrian Albert

Anatol Borisovich Rapoport (Ukrainian: Анатолій Борисович Рапопорт, romanized: Anatoliy Borysovych Rapoport; Russian: Анатолий Борисович Рапопорт; 22 May 1911 – 20 January 2007) was an American mathematical psychologist. He contributed to general systems theory, to mathematical biology and to the mathematical modeling of social interaction and stochastic models of contagion.

== Biography ==
Rapoport was born in Lozova, Kharkov Governorate, Russia (in today's Kharkiv Oblast, Ukraine) into a secular Jewish family. In 1922, he moved to the United States, and in 1928 became a naturalized citizen. He started studying music in Chicago and continued with piano, conducting and composition at the Vienna Hochschule für Musik where he studied from 1929 to 1934. However, due to the rise of Nazism, he found it impossible to make a career as a pianist.

He shifted his career into mathematics, completing a Ph.D. in mathematics under Otto Schilling and Abraham Adrian Albert at the University of Chicago in 1941 on the thesis Construction of Non-Abelian Fields with Prescribed Arithmetic. According to The Globe and Mail, he was a member of the American Communist Party for three years, but quit before enlisting in the U.S. Army Air Forces in 1941, serving in Alaska and India during World War II.

After the war, he joined the Committee on Mathematical Biology at the University of Chicago (1947–54), publishing his first book, Science and the Goals of Man, co-authored with semanticist S. I. Hayakawa in 1950. He also received a one-year fellowship at the prestigious Center for Advanced Study in the Behavioral Sciences at Stanford University.

From 1955 to 1970, Rapoport was Professor of Mathematical Biology and Senior Research Mathematician at the University of Michigan, as well as founding member, in 1955, of the Mental Health Research Institute (MHRI) at the University of Michigan. In 1970, during the Vietnam War, Rapoport moved to Toronto "to live in a country that was not committed to a messianic role—a small peaceful country with no aspiration to major power status". He was appointed professor of mathematics and psychology at the University of Toronto (1970–79). The university appointed him professor emeritus in 1980. He lived in bucolic Wychwood Park overlooking downtown Toronto, a neighbour of Marshall McLuhan. On his retirement from the University of Toronto, he became director of the Institute of Advanced Studies (Vienna) until 1983.

University of Toronto appointed him professor of peace studies in 1984, a position he held until 1996, but continued to teach until 2000.

In 1984 he co-founded Science for Peace, was elected president and remained on its executive until 1998.

In 1954 Anatol Rapoport co-founded the Society for General Systems Research, along with the researchers Ludwig von Bertalanffy, Ralph Gerard, and Kenneth Boulding. He became president of the Society for General Systems Research in 1965.

Anatol Rapoport died of pneumonia in Toronto. He was survived by his wife Gwen, daughter Anya, and sons Alexander and Anthony.

== Work ==
Rapoport contributed to general systems theory, to mathematical biology, and to the mathematical modeling of social interaction and stochastic models of contagion. He combined his mathematical expertise with psychological insights into the study of game theory, social networks, and semantics.

Rapoport extended these understandings into studies of psychological conflict, dealing with nuclear disarmament and international politics. His autobiography, Certainties and Doubts: A Philosophy of Life, was published in 2001. An article celebrating his legacy and thinking includes a career overview alongside testimonials by scholars and family that provide a glimpse of Anatol Rapoport, the scientist and the person.

Philosopher and physicist Mario Bunge called Rapoport a polymath whose work Bunge found congenial because of its applicability to real-life problems, its use of mathematics, and its "avoidance of holistic blabber".

=== Game theory ===
Rapoport had a versatile mind, working in mathematics, psychology, biology, game theory, social network analysis, and peace and conflict studies. For example, he pioneered in the modeling of parasitism and symbiosis, researching cybernetic theory. This went on to give a conceptual basis for his lifelong work in conflict and cooperation.

Among many other well-known books on fights, games, violence, and peace, Rapoport was the author of over 300 articles and of "Two-Person Game Theory" (1966) and "N-Person Game Theory" (1970). He analyzed contests in which there are more than two sets of conflicting interests, such as war, diplomacy, poker, or bargaining. His work led him to peace research, including books on The Origins of Violence (1989) and Peace, An Idea Whose Time Has Come (1993).

In the 1980s, he won a computer tournament which was based on Robert Axelrod's The Evolution of Cooperation and was designed to further understanding of the ways in which cooperation could emerge through evolution. The contenders had to present programs that could play iterated games of the prisoner's dilemma and these were pitted against each other. Rapoport's entry, Tit-for-Tat, has only four lines of code. The program opens by cooperating with its opponent. It then plays exactly as the other side played in the previous game. If the other side defected in the previous game, the program also defects; but only for one game. If the other side cooperates, the program continues to cooperate. According to Peace Magazine author/editor Metta Spencer, the program "punished the other player for selfish behaviour and rewarded her for cooperative behaviour—but the punishment lasted only as long as the selfish behaviour lasted. This proved to be an exceptionally effective sanction, quickly showing the other side the advantages of cooperating. It also set moral philosophers to proposing this as a workable principle to use in real life interactions."

His children report that he was a strong chess player but a bad poker player because he non-verbally revealed the strength of his hands.

=== Social network analysis ===
Rapoport was an early developer of social network analysis. His original work showed that one can measure large networks by profiling traces of flows through them. This enables learning about the speed of the distribution of resources, including information, and what speeds or impedes these flows—such as race, gender, socioeconomic status, proximity, and kinship. This work linked social networks to the diffusion of innovation, and by extension, to epidemiology. Rapoport's empirical work traced the spread of information within a school. It prefigured the study of degrees of separation by showing the rapid spread of information in a population to almost all—but not all—school members (see references below). His work on random nets predates the random graphs as defined by the Erdős–Rényi model and independently by Edgar Gilbert.

Rapoport is also the originator of the theory behind the interpretation of bias in social networks, which pertains to the extent to which a network deviates from a random base model. He introduced what is now known as "preferential attachment mechanism" in biased networks. It is a stochastic process that involves connected nodes that snowball into more connections. Rapoport also published an article that outlined a probabilistic approach to animal sociology, which is one of the earliest efforts at modeling simple social structures.

=== Conflict and peace studies ===
According to Thomas Homer-Dixon in the Toronto Globe and Mail, Rapoport "became anti-militarist quite soon after World War II. The idea of military values became anathema". He was a leading organizer of the first teach-ins against the Vietnam War at the University of Michigan, a model that spread rapidly throughout North America. He told at a teach-in: "By undertaking the war against Vietnam, the United States has undertaken a war against humanity…This war we shall not win". (Ann Arbor News, April 1967). He said he was an abolitionist, rather than a total pacifist: "I'm for killing the institution of war". In 1968, he signed the "Writers and Editors War Tax Protest" pledge, vowing to refuse tax payments in protest against the Vietnam War. As a result of his opposition to the Vietnam War, J.Edgar Hoover considered Rapoport a Communist, and organized FBI agents to write letters to the president of the University of Michigan, the Governor of Michigan and others. This smear campaign drove him from Ann Arbor to the University of Toronto.

Rapoport returned to the University of Toronto to become the founding (and unpaid) Professor of Peace and Conflict Studies programme, working with George Ignatieff and Canada's Science for Peace organization. As its sole professor at the start, he used a rigorous, interdisciplinary approach to the study of peace, integrating mathematics, politics, psychology, philosophy, science, and sociology. His main concern was to legitimize peace studies as a worthy academic pursuit. The Trudeau Centre for Peace and Conflict Studies continued to flourish at the University of Toronto under the leadership of Thomas Homer-Dixon, and, from 2008, under Ron Levi. When Rapoport began, there was one (unpaid) professor and twelve students. In 2007, there were three paid professors and ninety students.

Rapoport's students report that he was an engaged and inspiring professor who captured their attention, imagination and interest with his wide-ranging knowledge, passion for the subject, good humor, kind and generous spirit, attentiveness to student concerns, and animated teaching style.

In 1981 Rapoport co-founded the international non-governmental organization Science for Peace. He was recognized in the 1980s for his contribution to world peace through nuclear conflict restraint via his game theoretic models of psychological conflict resolution. He won the Lentz International Peace Research Prize in 1976. Professor Rapoport was also a member of the editorial board of the Journal of Environmental Peace published by the International Innovation Projects at the University of Toronto.

== Publications ==
=== Books ===
- 1950, Science and the Goals of Man, Harper & Bros., New York
- 1953, Operational Philosophy: Integrating Knowledge and Action, Harper & Bros., New York
- 1960, Fights, Games, and Debates, University of Michigan Press, Ann Arbor
- 1965, Prisoner's Dilemma, The University of Michigan, Ann Arbor, MI. (co-author; Albert M. Chammah)
- 1966, Two-Person Game Theory: The Essential Ideas, Ann Arbor, MI, The University of Michigan Press. (reprinted by Dover Press, Mineola, NY, 1999).
- 1969, Strategy and Conscience, Shocken Books, New York, NY. (first published in 1964)
- 1970, N-Person Game Theory. Concepts and Applications, University of Michigan, Ann Arbor, MI. (reprinted by Dover Press, Mineola, NY, 2001).
- 1974, Conflict in Man-made Environment, Harmondsworth, Penguin Books.
- 1975, Semantics, Crowell.
- 1986, General System Theory. Essential Concepts and Applications, Abacus, Tunbridge Wells.
- 1989, The Origins of Violence: Approaches to the Study of Conflict, Paragon House, New York.
- 1989, Decision Theory and Decision Behaviour, Kluwer Academic Publishers.
- 1992, Peace: An Idea, Whose Time Has Come, University of Michigan Press, Ann Arbor, MI.
- 2000, Certainties and Doubts: A Philosophy of Life, Black Rose Books, Montreal, 2000. His autobiography.
- 2001, Skating on Thin Ice, RDR Books, Oakland, CA.
- Рапопорт, А. Б. (2003). Три разговора с русскими. Об истине, любви, борьбе и мире. Прогресс-Традиция. ISBN 5-89826-156-7. (English version: Rapoport, Anatol (2005). Conversations with Three Russians: Tolstoy, Dostoevsky, Lenin: A Systemic View on Two Centuries of Societal Evolution. Verlag Dr. Kovač. ISBN 978-3830019558.).

=== Selected articles ===
- 1948, "Cycle distributions in random nets." Bull. Math. Biophysics 10(3):145–157.
- 1951, with Ray Solomonoff, "Connectivity of random nets." Bull. Math. Biophysics 13:107–117.
- 1953, "Spread of information through a population with sociostructural bias: I. Assumption of transitivity." Bulletin of Mathematical Biophysics, 15, 523–533.
- 1956, with Ralph W. Gerard and Clyde Kluckhohn, "Biological and cultural evolution: Some analogies and explorations". Behavioral Science 1:6–34.
- 1957, "Contribution to the Theory of Random and Biased Nets." Bulletin of Mathematical Biology 19:257–77.
- 1960 with W.J. Horvath, "The theoretical channel capacity of a single neuron as determined by various coding systems". Information and Control, 3(4):335–350.
- 1962, "The Use and Misuse of Game Theory". Scientific American, 207:108–114.
- 1963, "Mathematical models of social interaction". R. D. Luce, R. R. Bush, & E. Galanter (Eds.), Handbook of Mathematical Psychology, Vol. II, pp. 493–579. New York, NY: John Wiley and Sons.
- 1974, with Lawrence B. Slobodkin, "An optimal strategy of evolution". Q. Rev. Biol. 49:181–200
- 1979, "Some Problems Relating to Randomly Constructed Biased Networks." Perspectives on Social Network Research:119–164.
- 1989, with Y. Yuan, "Some Aspects of Epidemics and Social Nets." Pp. 327–348 in The Small World, ed. by Manfred Kochen. Norwood, NJ: Ablex.

=== About Rapoport ===
- Csillag, Ron (31 January 2007). "Anatol Rapoport, academic 1911–2007". Toronto Globe and Mail. p. S7.
- Farhoumand-Sims, Cheshmak (April 2007). "Memories of Anatol Rapoport". Peace Magazine. p. 14.
- Ferguson, Alisa (20 February 2007). "Rapoport was renowned mathematical psychologist, peace activist". University of Toronto Bulletin.
- Schwaninger, Markus (November 2007). "Anatol Rapoport (May 22, 1911 – January 20, 2007): pioneer of systems theory and peace research, mathematician, philosopher and pianist" (PDF). Systems Research and Behavioral Science. 24 (6): 655–658. doi:10.1002/sres.833. Archived from the original (PDF) on 20 January 2022.
- Kopelman, Shirli (February 2020). "Tit for tat and beyond: the legendary work of Anatol Rapoport". Negotiation and Conflict Management Research. 13 (1): 60–84. doi:10.1111/ncmr.12172. hdl:2027.42/153763.

== See also ==
- Rogerian argument § Rapoport's rules
- Rogerian argument § Rapoport's three ways of changing people
