= List of accidents and incidents involving military aircraft (1970–1974) =

This is a list of notable accidents and incidents involving military aircraft grouped by the year in which the accident or incident occurred. Not all of the aircraft were in operation at the time. For more exhaustive lists, see the Aircraft Crash Record Office, the Air Safety Network, or the Dutch Scramble Website Brush and Dustpan Database. Combat losses are not included, except for a very few cases denoted by singular circumstances.

== Aircraft terminology ==
Information on aircraft gives the type, and if available, the serial number of the operator in italics, the constructors number, also known as the manufacturer's serial number (c/n), exterior codes in apostrophes, nicknames (if any) in quotation marks, flight callsign in italics, and operating units.

== 1970 ==
10 January
Developmental prototype Indian Air Force HAL HF-24 Marut Mk.IR, HF 032, equipped with reheat, crashed just after takeoff, killing India's finest test pilot, Suranjan Das. Failure of one engine and partial failure of the second was rumored, but the official inquiry attributed the loss to a malfunctioning canopy locking system. Reheat trials did not resume until 1972, using second prototype BD 884. Reheat upgrades are subsequently abandoned.

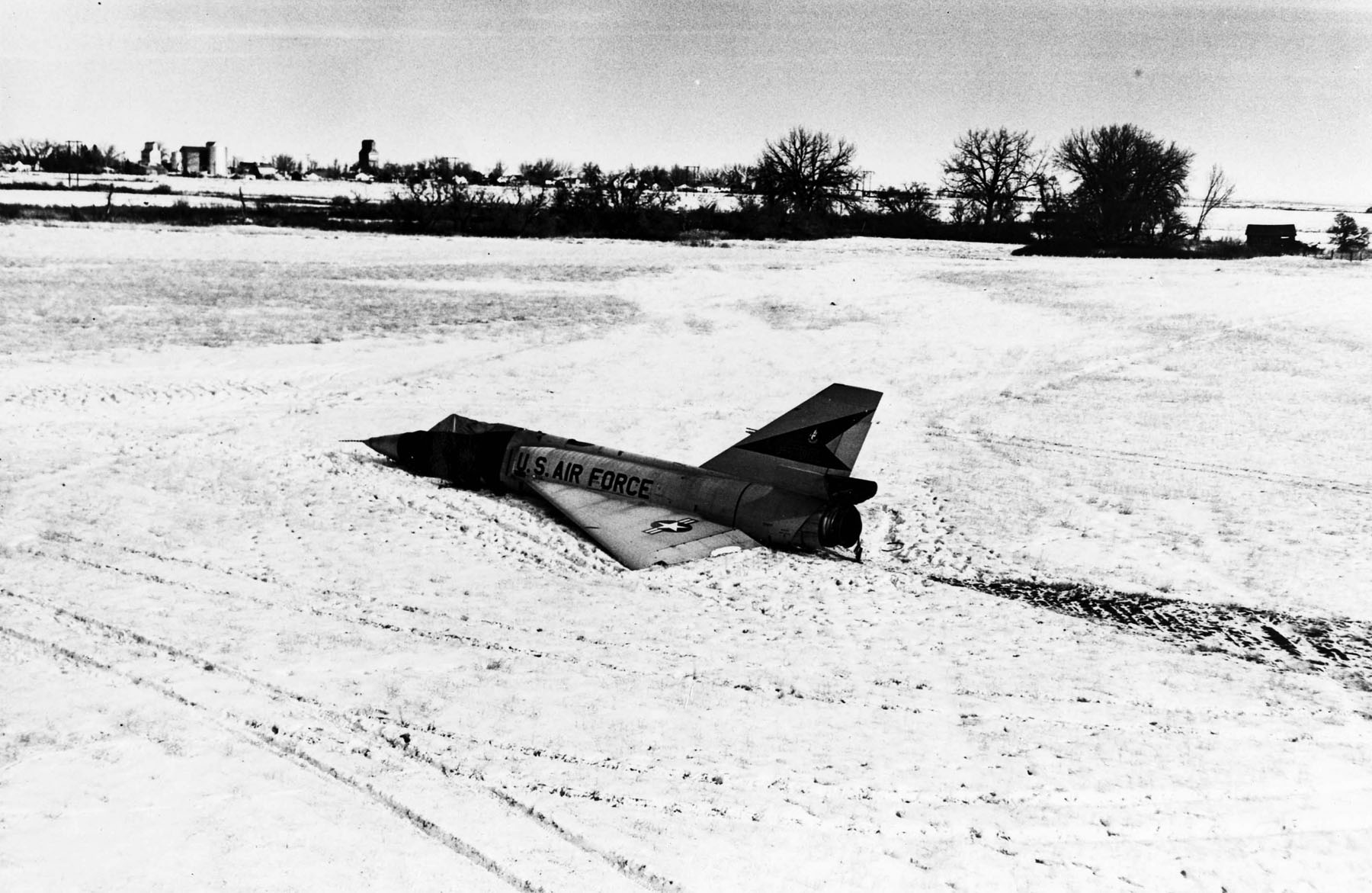
F-106A, 58-0787, on the ground after the pilot ejected.

2 February
A Convair F-106A-100-CO Delta Dart, 58-0787, of the 71st Fighter-Interceptor Squadron, out of Malmstrom AFB, (the Cornfield Bomber), piloted by Capt. Gary Faust, went into a post-stall gyration during a high-speed rudder roll and entered a flat spin during air combat maneuvering (ACM) over Montana. Faust followed procedures and ejected from the aircraft at ~8,000 feet. The resulting change of balance caused the aircraft to go nose-down, stabilize, and it landed wheels up in a snow-covered wheatfield near Big Sandy, Montana, suffering almost no damage. The aircraft was then sent back to base by rail, repaired at McClellan AFB, California, and returned to service. Preserved initially at Griffiss AFB, New York, it is now on display at the National Museum of the United States Air Force.

26 March
First SEPECAT Jaguar prototype, E-01, crashed during a landing attempt at Centre D'essais en Vol, Istres-Le Tubé Air Base, France, after declaring an in-flight emergency. Test pilot CDT A. M. L. Brossier shut down the starboard engine after an engine bay warning due to a catastrophic fire; on return to base and finding the speed excessive, the pilot shut down the remaining engine and thus lost the hydraulics, having neglected to start the electrically driven hydraulic pump. Without flying controls he was obliged to eject, receiving minor injuries.

3 April
A U.S. Air Force Boeing B-52D Stratofortress, 55-089, of the 28th Bomb Wing caught fire and crashed during landing at Ellsworth AFB, South Dakota, skidding into a brick storage building containing 25,000 gallons of jet fuel. Heroic efforts by crash crew saved all nine on board, although one suffered broken limbs, and three firefighters were injured. One of the eight jet engines ran for forty minutes following the crash.

16 April
US Navy McDonnell Douglas TA-4F Skyhawk, BuNo 154308, c/n 13696, of VA-43, from NAS Oceana, Virginia, and U.S. Air Force North American T-39A-1-NA Sabreliner, 61-0640, c/n 265-43, en route from Shaw AFB, South Carolina to Langley AFB, Virginia, collided in mid-air, the T-39 coming down over residential area of Weldon, North Carolina, but no one on the ground was injured and wreckage missed homes. Skyhawk crew, Lts. George D. Green, 27, and Walter G. Young, 27, both of Virginia Beach, Virginia, were killed as it came down in a swamp area ~20 miles away, near Enfield, North Carolina. Pilot Col. Francis G. Halturewicz, of the Sabreliner, was credited with minimizing ground damage as he jettisoned most of its fuel before impact. Col. Ivey J. Lewis, Stockton, California, Halturewicz, Maj. Ronald L. Edwards, and T. Sgt. Joseph R. Brown, all of MacDill AFB, Florida were killed.

18 April
USMC Major General Edwin B. Wheeler, members of his staff, and Colonel Edward A. Wilcox (1st Marines), on an inspection of a search and destroy operation, were involved in a helicopter crash on approach to a jungle landing zone ~15 miles southwest of Da Nang, South Vietnam. Wheeler suffered a broken leg.

28 April
A U.S. Air Force McDonnell Douglas F-4 Phantom II being ferried from Robins AFB, Georgia to Torrejon Air Base, Spain, was disabled by a severe thunderstorm, forcing the crew to eject at 36,000 feet 150 miles E of Charleston, South Carolina, suffering minor injuries from hail while descending. Pilot Capt. Daniel Heitz, 25, of Grand Rapids, Michigan, and navigator Lt. MacArthur Weston, 28, of Jacksonville, North Carolina were spotted by rescue aircraft and were recovered after two hours in the water by the oil tanker Texaco Illinois, diverted from 8 miles away.

4 May
A Convair T-29, "Visco 57", departed Hamilton Air Force Base, California, at ~0800 hrs with four crew members and 10 passengers, en route to Fairchild AFB, Spokane, Washington, on a hazy but otherwise clear morning. Just minutes after takeoff, it clipped a ridge SE of Petaluma, crashed and burned, killing 13 of those on board.

6 May
USAF RF-4C-21-MC Phantom II, 64-1018, 'AR' tailcode, of 1st Tactical Reconnaissance Squadron, 10th Tactical Reconnaissance Wing, based at RAF Alconbury in England, and on Defensive Combat Manouvres over the English Peak District, crashed in woods at Unthank, near Dronfield in Derbyshire, England. The crew ejected over Curbar Edge in Derbyshire. The pilot, Major Don Tokar, 37, of Colorado Springs, Colorado, suffered a compound leg fracture after landing on rocks. The navigator, Major Peter Dunn, 34, of Salem, Illinois, escaped with minor cuts and lacerations sustained on landing.

10 May
Lockheed SR-71A, 61-7969, Article 2020, crashed near Korat RTAFB, Thailand, after a refuelling resulted in a subsonic high-speed stall. Pilot Lawson and RSO Martinez ejected safely.

11 May
An F5 tornado struck Lubbock, Texas destroying about one quarter of the city. Nineteen of 23 U.S. Air Force trainers (probably Cessna T-41 Mescaleros) at Lubbock International Airport were destroyed, amongst 100 aircraft damaged.

12 May
Indian Air Force prototype HAL HF-24 Marut HF 001, BR 461, was lost due to unknown circumstances in the sea off Goa while on a routine ferry flight. Squadron Leader K. L. Narayan was lost with the aircraft.

22 May
A U.S. Air Force Lockheed T-33A Shooting Star of the 1st Composite Wing, Andrews AFB, Maryland, crashed just short of the north runway on approach to that base, killing pilot Maj. John H. McDowell Jr., 37, Clinton, Maryland, and Lt. Edwin D. Billmeyer, 24, of Baltimore, Maryland, and injuring three motorists on the ground.

24 May
A U.S. Air Force Lockheed C-5A Galaxy made an emergency landing at Dobbins AFB, Georgia, suffering an electrical malfunction that knocked out landing lights, caused minor damage to the nosegear and flattened four of 28 tires.

27 May
A U.S. Air Force Lockheed C-5A Galaxy, 67-0172, c/n 500-0011, caught fire while taxiing at Air Force Plant 42, Palmdale, California, due to an electrical fire in the cargo compartment. Five crewmembers escaped, but seven firefighters suffered minor injuries fighting blaze. The aircraft was destroyed.

June
RAF Armstrong Whitworth Argosy C.1, XP441, of No. 114 Squadron RAF, written off during training accident at RAF Benson, when the aircraft bounced heavily during a three-engine approach and attempted a go-around, but the pilot inexpertly retracted the flaps, stalled, and came down in Mr. Passey's junk yard in the village of Benson. The crew, remarkably, was uninjured.

6 June
A U.S. Air Force Lockheed C-5A Galaxy, 68-0212, c/n 500-0015, fifteenth off the production line, but first to be delivered to any operational Military Airlift Command wing, lost one tire and blew another on landing at Charleston AFB, South Carolina for the 437th MAW.

11 June
A U.S. Navy Grumman A-6A Intruder No. 156998, flown by pilot LT James D. Maynard, age 25, and bombardier LTJG William H. Van Stone, Jr., of VA-145 stationed at NAS Whidbey Island, Washington, crashed while on a routine practice bombing run over the Boardman Bombing Range near Boardman, Oregon. Although both crewmen ejected, the 23-year old Van Stone did not survive.

17 June
Lockheed SR-71A, 61-7970, Item 2021, collided with a KC-135Q tanker 20 miles E of El Paso, Texas. Pilot Buddy Brown and RSO Mort Jarvis eject safely. The tanker limped back to Beale Air Force Base, California.

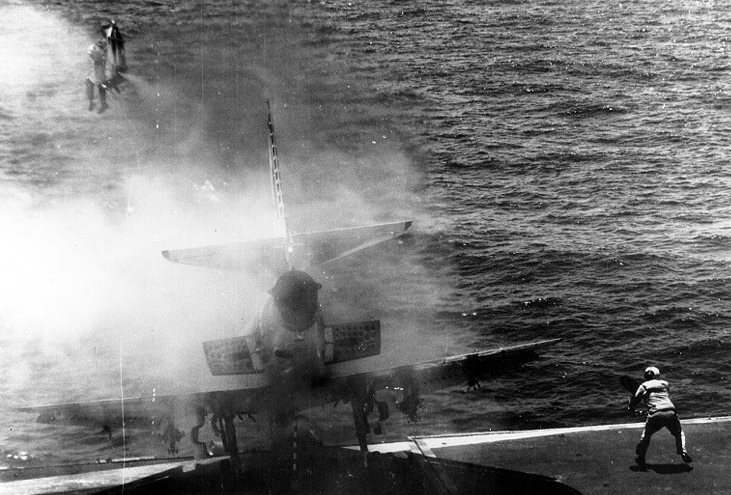
Lt. (j.g.) William Belden, ejects from an A-4E Skyhawk on the deck of the USS Shangri-La circa 29 July 1970. Photo by Photographers Mate Keith Guthrie of Palatka, Florida. Both pilot and Skyhawk recovered. Navy photo NH-90350

27 June
Rawalpindi, Pakistan, Cessna L-19 Bird Dog of No.4 Army Aviation Squadron, Dhamial Air Base, piloted by Major Tahir Mahmood Jilani, with Observer Captain Noor Mohammed, went missing, while on search and recovery mission to locate a drowned military officer Captain Bahadur's body, over the River Indus near Kalabagh-Khushal Garh area. No debris or bodies were located, in the very extensive ground and aerial search that followed, however.

18 July
Soviet Air Force Antonov An-22, c/n 00340207, CCCP-09303, of the 81st Military Transport Aviation Regiment, crashed in the Atlantic Ocean, killing all 22 on board; the cause was never fully determined, but decompression was theorized. The aircraft was transporting humanitarian aid to Peru following an earthquake. All pressurized An-22s were grounded following the crash.

24 July
U.S. Air Force McDonnell Douglas F-4C-20-MC Phantom II, 63-7609, crashes SE of McNeal, Arizona.

Circa 29 July
Lt. (j.g.) William Belden, 23, of Racine, Wisconsin, ejected from a McDonnell Douglas A-4E Skyhawk on the deck of the USS Shangri-La in the western Pacific. The pilot was recovered shaken but unhurt by helicopter; The Skyhawk was later recovered from the carrier's catwalk.

30 July
USMC Lockheed KC-130F Hercules, BuNo 150685, c/n 3728, of VMGR-152, crashed at Marine Corps Air Station El Toro, Lake Forest, California during a misjudged maximum effort landing – the wings broke, the fuselage ended up overturned and then caught fire.

3 August
A Lockheed P-3A-55-LO Orion, BuNo 152159, c/n 185-5129, 'ZE-06', of VP-17, NAS Barbers Point, Hawaii, exploded in flight after takeoff from Nellis AFB, Nevada, crashing near Searchlight, Nevada and killing all ten aboard. The cause of the accident was never determined.

5 August
A U.S. Air Force McDonnell Douglas F-4 Phantom II of the 36th TFW, Bitburg, Germany, TDY to Zaragoza Air Base, Spain, crashed on a gunnery range 25 miles from Zaragoza, killing pilot Capt. Charles A. Baldwin, 28, of Charleston, West Virginia and navigator Capt. Stephen N. Smith, 27, of Pinebrook, New Jersey.

25 August
A Lockheed TF-104G Starfighter, 27+30, c/n 5732, of MFG 1, Marineflieger, was downed by engine failure due to FOD, shortly after take-off from Jagel Air Base at Glücksburg in northern West Germany, both crew ejecting safely. Although the cause of the crash was not immediately known, a spokesman said it might have been struck by a bird in flight. This was the 122nd West German Starfighter crash since the type entered service in 1961.

1 September
A Vought F-8J Crusader, BuNo 150329, of VF-24 suffered a ramp strike on the USS Hancock and exploded during night carrier qualifications, killing Lt. Darrell N. Eggert.

8 September
USAF Captain William Schaffner, on exchange with the Royal Air Force, crashed his BAC Lightning, Foxtrot 94, into the North Sea off Flamborough Head while on an intercept exercise. Schaffner flew too low and impacted the water; he attempted to bail out, but his ejector seat failed. The aircraft was recovered three months later, but Captain Schaffner's body was never found. There was unfounded speculation that Schaffner was the victim of an alien abduction.

8 September
US Marine Corps Capt. Patrick G. Carroll, 27, of El Toro, California, ejected safely moments before his Douglas A-4E Skyhawk, BuNo 150089, crashed in a remote area 20 miles N of Big Bear, California in Lucerne Valley at 1528 hrs. The impact initiated a 30-acre brushfire in Lovelace Canyon, south and west of the Lucerne Valley, which was still burning the following day. Eight retardant-dropping fire bombers were diverted from another blaze near Devore, California, in the Cajon Pass to help contain the burn. A total of 12 California Division of Forestry and other trucks are also dispatched to the site to fight the fire. The pilot, who was flying N over Big Bear Lake on a navigation training flight, suffered an undetermined malfunction, said a public information spokesman at MCAS El Toro, California. He was seen as he ejected by a gas company serviceman, James Kennedy, who picked him up and drove him to nearby Sky-High Ranch. Carroll, a Vietnam veteran, was picked up by a rescue helicopter from George Air Force Base, California, and was not injured. Firefighters were hindered by rough, rocky terrain and a truck that overturned on an access road, blocking the path for over an hour. Fire crew were lifted to the site by helicopter or had to walk in 1 1/2 miles from Highway 18 near the Lucerne Valley. CDF officials expected the blaze to be contained by 1800 hrs., 9 September, unless winds developed.

29 October
The crash of a U.S. Army Beechcraft U-8F Seminole, 62-3865, c/n LF.63, at Tri-State Airport, Kenova, West Virginia, killed General Edwin H. Burba and two warrant officers, and seriously injures Burba's aide. Burba was en route to Morehead, Kentucky, and Morehead State University, to participate in ceremonies honoring that institution's Army Reserve Officer Training Corps Program and to present the Outstanding Service Civilian Award, the Army's highest civilian award, to his friend and the school's president, Dr. Adron Doran. Traffic controllers at the southwestern West Virginia airport, located near the Ohio and Kentucky borders, said that one of the co-pilots radioed that they had an engine out and were attempting to land on instruments. Moments later the twin-engined aircraft crashed into trees in heavy rain and fog, coming down three-quarters of a mile west of the airport's main runway. Burba, 58, died in the accident as did CW2 Paul R. Burt and CW3 Maynard R. Reisinger. Aide Capt. James B. Bickerton was listed in critical condition in hospital where he was admitted to surgery. "General Burba became deputy commander of the First Army in 1968. He served in Africa and Europe during World War II and was wounded in Tunisia in 1943. He served twice in Korea. His medals include the Silver Star, Bronze Star with oak leaf cluster, Legion of Merit with three oak leaf clusters, and the Purple Heart." Kelly Pool at Fort George Meade, Maryland, was renamed Burba Lake in his honor during a dedication ceremony on Memorial Day, 31 May 1971. The crash was determined to have been due to a fatal design flaw in the fuel cross-feed system.

11 November
A U.S. Air Force McDonnell F-4C-24-MC Phantom II, 64-0863, c/n 1238, 'WS' tailcode, of the 91st Tactical Fighter Squadron, 81st Tactical Fighter Wing, crashed in the North Sea after an engine fire. Both crew ejected. Capt. Johnny Jones, 28, of Snow Hill, North Carolina, and Capt. David Allen, 27, of Darien, Connecticut were rescued by helicopter, officials at Ruislip, England said.

15 November
US Navy Grumman S-2 Tracker crashes at Fort Dix, New Jersey killing four. Wreckage found on 16 November in wooded area off Range Road. The following were killed: Pilot Navy Lt. J.G. James K. Larson, 24, of Milltown, New Jersey, co-pilot 1st Lt. (USMC) Carleton C. Perine, 25, of Orange, New Jersey, and passengers Navy Airman Apprentice Robert Suttle, 20, of Bricktown, New Jersey, and Navy Airman Apprentice Gary B. Warner, 19, of Central Bridge, New York.

16 November
A U.S. Navy McDonnell Douglas F-4J-42-MC Phantom II, BuNo 155903, crashed in the Atlantic Ocean 30 miles E of the Virginia Capes shortly after launch from the carrier USS Forrestal. Two crewmembers, out of NAS Oceana, Virginia, were lost, the Navy reported on 17 November. The pilot was Lt.j.g. John Dale O'Connor and the RSO was Lt.j.g. Thomas F. Hanagan, both of Virginia Beach, Virginia. They were attached to VF-101, a fighter squadron based at NAS Oceana at Virginia Beach.

24 November
A Lockheed U-2R, 68-10335, Article 057, the seventh airframe of the first R-model order, first flown 30 July 1968, registered N815X and delivered to the CIA 29 August 1968, crashed at Taoyuan Air Base, Taiwan, on landing after a routine, high-altitude training flight, ROCAF Pilot Capt. Denny Huang was killed. At touchdown he skipped slightly and began drifting to starboard. Exacerbated by a 12-knot crosswind, the aircraft left the runway, whereupon the pilot applied power to go around. Before the engine spooled up, the airframe struck a six-foot high runway marker. It then began a slow climbing turn to port but its nose-high angle-of-attack caused the aircraft to stall, crash and catch fire. The Accident Board recommended that the Dash One pilot's manual be amended to emphasize that a go-around should not be attempted after loss of directional control on landing. This was the first loss of an R-model.

15 December
RAF English Electric Canberra B(I).8, XM267, 'E', of No 3(F) Squadron, crashed at RAF Akrotiri, Cyprus, while on detachment from Squadron base at RAF Laarbruch, Germany. On approach to Akrotiri runway pilot elected to carry out an over shoot. When both engines were throttled up the starboard engine responded and increased power; the port engine failed to respond. The effect of this was the aircraft 'cartwheeled' and the port wing hit the ground, killing both crewmembers, Pilot F/O R.Ellis and Navigator F/O R MacMillan, and one passenger, Senior Aircraftman Kim Petty-Fitzmaurice.

15 December
U.S. Navy Grumman C-2A Greyhound, BuNo 155120, of VRC-50, out of NAS Atsugi, crashed on takeoff from USS Ranger, in the Gulf of Tonkin. The aircraft stalled after catapult launch with a probable load shift of the cargo, reached an extreme nose-up attitude, went into a hammerhead stall and crashed off the carrier's port bow. 9 personnel were killed, plus 7 missing.

19 December
Soviet Air Force Antonov An-22, c/n 9340205, CCCP-09305, crashed at Panagarh Airport, India while attempting a belly landing, killing all 17 on board. Forty minutes after takeoff from Dhaka, one of the propeller blades separated, destroying engine control cables. The crew began descending and was attempting an emergency wheels-up landing when the aircraft crashed.

30 December
A Prototype Tomcat, Grumman F-14-01-GR Tomcat, 157980, suffered a hydraulic fluid leak on its second flight. The crew attempted return to the Grumman plant at Calverton, New York, but lost flight controls just before crossing the airfield threshold. Both crewmembers ejected as the airframe plunged into woods short of the runway.

== 1971 ==
7 January
An unarmed U.S. Air Force Boeing B-52C Stratofortress, 54-2666, callsign Hiram 16, of the 99th Bombardment Wing (Heavy), Westover AFB, Massachusetts, crashed into Lake Michigan near Charlevoix, Michigan during a practice bomb-run following wing failure and exploded on impact. Only a small amount of wreckage, two life vests, and some spilled fuel were found in Little Traverse Bay. The bomber went down six nautical miles from the Bay Shore Air Force Radar Site. Its nine crewmembers were killed. The left wing spars had snapped in two due to fatigue, causing the wing to fail between the left two engine pods.

8 January
General Dynamics FB-111A, 68-0283, c/n B1-55, of the 340th Bombardment Group (Medium), Carswell AFB, Texas, on its acceptance test flight from the General Dynamics Plant in Fort Worth, crashed three miles NE of Mandeville, Louisiana, killing both crewmembers, Lt. Col. Bruce D. Stocks, 38, and Maj. Billy C. Gentry, 36. Over 125 aircraft including Air Force planes from Carswell and Sheppard Air Force Bases, of the Civil Air Patrol (77 from the Fort Worth area and 55 from San Antonio) and the Coast Guard logged more than 275 flight hours in the search by 11 January. The search was expanded into Louisiana and Mississippi on 13 January. "We suspect the plane may have traveled into the areas of Louisiana, southern Mississippi and East Texas," said Capt. Tom Lauterback, information officer at Carswell AFB, on Wednesday 13 January. The escape module with the crew's remains was not found until 2 February, three weeks after the loss. A parachute was found hanging from a nearby tree, but it did not deploy in time to save the airmen. An FB-111A escape module displayed at the Strategic Air and Space Museum, Ashland, Nebraska, is said to be from this accident.

21 January
An Armee de l'Air Nord 262A-34, 44/F-RBOA, c/n 44, (delivered January 1969) on a flight from Paris to the isotope separation plant at Pierrelatte, France, crashed on a snow-covered peak in Southern France in a blizzard, killing all 21 on board including 13 of the nation's top experts on nuclear weapons and atomic production. They were on their way to a meeting of scientists to coordinate projects of the Atomic Energy Commission and the armed forces. A helicopter pilot who flew over the scene said that only the tail was intact and that no one could have survived the crash. Icing was initially speculated as a possible cause. "The crew had been cleared by Marseilles ACC at FL 80 to the Montelimar (MTL) VOR and FL50 afterwards. FL80 (8000 ft) was the minimum safe altitude between CMF (Clermont Ferrand) and MTL. Controllers at the time considered it possible that the pilot might have retained the FL50 as the final clearance and had disregarded the initial FL80 instruction." Among the victims were Rear Adm. Robert Landrin, 55, deputy chief of staff of the armed forces, and Jacques Mabile, production director of the AEC and the man credited with developing France's uranium resources. Others included Gen. Edouard Billion, 54, head of nuclear affairs in the arms division of the Defense Ministry; Gen. Jean-Marc Pineau, 48, chief of planning for the chiefs of staff and three of his senior officers: Jean la Bussiere, AEC financial director; Hubert de la Boylaye, head of the commission's radiological safety division, and Georges Tirole, AEC deputy director for military applications. One source identified the crash site as Gerbier du Jonc peak while another states that the twin-engine turboprop struck Suc de Pradou, a 1342 m high mountain and came to rest 200 m below the summit.

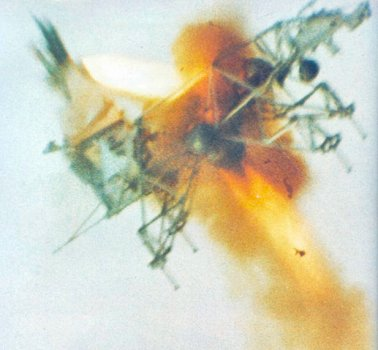
Test pilot Stuart Present ejects safely from crashing LLTV (NASA), 29 January 1971.

29 January
A Lunar Landing Training Vehicle crashed at Ellington AFB, Texas. NASA test pilot Stuart Present ejected safely.

19 February
A Beechcraft L-23 crashed into Mt. Sanford at the 14,800 elevation level, east of Glennallen, Alaska. The plane was en route from Sharp Army Depot in Stockton, CA to Anchorage, Alaska, and had a two week delay in Whitehorse, British Columbia due to mechanical problems. The plane was carrying Lt Col. William Caldwell, Maj. Steven W. Henault, and Sgt. Herbert Alex. There were no survivors.

26 February
A Luftwaffe Lockheed F-104G Starfighter, 22+64, c/n 7145, of Detachment Deci, crashed during a gunnery training flight on the Fransca range over the Italian island of Sardinia after its pilot parachuted to safety, the defense ministry said, making it the 128th crash of the type since entering German service in 1961. The plane's engine had failed due to foreign object debris.

15 April
Sergei Nikolayevich Anokhin, Russian engineer and former cosmonaut (1 April 1910 – 15 April 1986), was injured in the crash of a Tupolev Tu-16 into the Aral Sea while the bomber was flying parabolas for zero-G tests of the engine of the Molniya Block L upper stage, to study why the stage was continually failing to restart in earth orbit.

23 April
A U.S. Air Force General Dynamics F-111E, 67-0117, c/n A1-162/E-3, out of Edwards Air Force Base, California, crashed in a rocky area of the Mojave Desert 12 miles S of Death Valley National Monument during a test flight, both crew, pilot Maj. James W. Hurt, 34, of Indianapolis, Indiana, and WSO Maj. Robert J. Furman, 31, of New York City, were killed when the escape module's parachute failed to open until just before ground impact. Both bodies were inside the escape module when it was found on Saturday, 24 April. The aircraft experienced trouble at 6,000 feet. This was the 18th crash of the type since entering service and the second fatal accident this year due to the module chute failing to properly deploy. All F-111s were grounded on Thursday 30 April after it was determined that the recovery chute compartment door failed to separate, making crew escape impossible. This was the sixth grounding order for the type since it entered operation. The order was lifted on 8 June 1971, following replacement of the panel that failed in this accident.

6 June
A USMC McDonnell Douglas F-4B-18-MC Phantom II, BuNo 151458, of VMFA-323, en route from NAS Fallon, Nevada to MCAS El Toro, California, collided in mid-air with Hughes Airwest Flight 706, a DC-9-31 (N9345) out of Los Angeles International Airport, at 1811 hrs. over the San Gabriel Mountains, N of Duarte, California. The collision at 15,150 feet altitude killed F-4 pilot 1st Lt. James R. Phillips, 28, of Denver, Colorado (inoperable canopy release), the RIO ejecting and landing near Azusa, California. All 44 passengers and five crewmembers were killed aboard the DC-9, which impacted into a remote canyon of Mt. Bliss approximately three miles N of the city of Duarte. The wreckage of the F-4B fighter landed in another canyon approximately 0.75 miles SE of the DC-9's crash site. Although visibility was good, with no clouds, both crews failed to see and avoid each other. The Airwest DC-9 jetliner was under radar control, but the F-4B fighter was flying with an inoperable transponder that made it invisible on air traffic control radar screens. The RIO, Lt. Christopher E. Schiess, 24, of Salem, Oregon, admitted to inquiry board that the F-4B had performed a 360-degree slow roll about a minute before the collision. One of the early leaders of campus antiwar activism, Prof. Arnold Saul Kaufman, at the University of Michigan in 1965 and, at the time, Philosophy professor at UCLA, was killed aboard the DC-9.

13 June
A USAF Boeing EC-135N, 61-0331, c/n 18238, of the 4950th Test Wing, Space and Missile Systems Organization (SAMSO), Wright-Patterson AFB, Ohio, en route from Pago Pago, American Samoa, to Hickam AFB, Hawaii, after monitoring the French Encelade atmospheric nuclear test, conducted 12 June 1971, disappeared over the Pacific Ocean ~70 miles S of Hawaii near Palmyra Island. Twelve military personnel and twelve civilians were lost. Only small pieces of wreckage were found.

15 June
A Lockheed NF-104A Starfighter, 56-0756, c/n 183-1044, assigned to Aerospace Research Pilot School, Edwards Air Force Base, California, suffered second rocket explosion, blowing the whole rocket motor and part of rudder off in flight at 35,000 ft and travelling at Mach 1.15. Pilot Capt. Howard C. Thompson landed safely but, as the NF-104 project was due to end soon, the airplane was written off and portions of it were subsequently used to create the composite "760" sitting on a pole at the Air Force Flight Test Center, Edwards Air Force Base.

30 June
The crew of Soyuz 11, Georgi Dobrovolski, Viktor Patsayev and Vladislav Volkov, were killed after undocking from space station Salyut 1 after a three-week stay. A valve on their spacecraft accidentally opened when the service module separated, letting their air leak out into space. The capsule reentered the atmosphere and landed normally, and their deaths were discovered only when it was opened by the recovery team. Technically the three cosmonauts remain the only fatalities in space (i.e., above 100 km).

8 July
"Israel's military command said [on 9 July] that 10 Israeli soldiers are missing and presumed killed in the crash of a helicopter in the Mediterranean off the Sinai coast. The announcement said the helicopter went down Thursday afternoon. It was the heaviest reported loss of life involving Israeli troops since the Arab-Israeli cease-fire began last Aug.8. There was no explanation for the crash off the occupied Sinai tour [sic] of El Arish, but an Israeli spokesman ruled out any Arab involvement. Thursday was a perfect flying day in Israel, with clear skies and no clouds. Israeli planes and rescue ships searched the area but found neither wreckage nor survivors. The military command said a committee had been set up to investigate the crash." The Sikorsky CH-53 Yas'ur crashed into the sea off the Sinai coast, killing 10 soldiers and officers as they returned to Israel following a mission.

12 July
A Piper PA-48 Enforcer, N202PE, c/n PE2-1001, crashed after structural failure due to flutter caused by a Piper-modified elevator trim-tab, off Vero Beach, Florida. Four of the heavily modified, turbine-powered TF-51 derivatives were built for the counter-insurgency role with two tested at Eglin AFB, Florida in 1983–1984, but no orders were ever placed.

27 July
An Indian Air Force production HAL HF-24 Marut Mk.1, flown by Wing Commander J. K. Mohlah, crashed just after takeoff at Bangalore, pilot KWF.

30 July
At approximately 14:00 hr., a Japanese Air Self Defense Force North American F-86F Sabre, 92-7932, collided in mid-air at FL280 with All Nippon Airways Flight 58, a Boeing 727-281, JA8329, on a regional flight between Sapporo and Tokyo-Haneda. The student pilot was not watching out for other traffic in the training area, and when the instructor warned him to break away from the approaching jetliner, it was too late, the Sabre's right wing striking the 727s left horizontal stabilizer. All seven crewmembers and 155 passengers on the Boeing were killed, wreckage coming down near Shizukuishi. The F-86F's crew ejected. All Japanese military aircraft were immediately grounded while the accident investigation took place.

18 August
US Army CH-47A 66-19023, c/n B.281, of the 4th Aviation Company, 15th Aviation Group, crashed near Pegnitz when the aft rotor blades separated due to fatigue, killing all 37 on board. The helicopter was transporting soldiers of the Heavy Mortar Platoon, 2nd Battalion, 4th Infantry Regiment, 56th Field Artillery Brigade from battalion headquarters in Ludwigsburg to Grafenwoehr for live fire training exercises. A memorial plaque was placed near the crash site in the forest outside Pegnitz, but this was stolen in 2009.

20 August
A Pakistan Air Force T-33 trainer was hijacked before the Indo-Pakistani war of 1971 in Karachi when a Bengali instructor pilot, Flight Lieutenant Matiur Rahman, struck and knocked out the young Pilot Officer Rashid Minhas with the intention of defecting to India with the plane and national secrets. On regaining consciousness in mid-flight, Minhas struggled for flight control as well as relaying the news of his hijack to the PAF base. In the end of the ensuing struggle he succeeded in crashing his aircraft into the ground near Thatta on seeing no way to prevent the hijack and the defection. He was posthumously awarded Pakistan's highest military award Nishan-e-Haider (Sign of the Lion) for his act of bravery. Rahman was posthumously awarded Bangladesh's highest military award, Bir Sreshtho, for his attempt to defect to join the civil war in East Pakistan (present-day Bangladesh).

11 September
A Lockheed C-121 Constellation of the West Virginia Air National Guard, carrying five state governors to a conference in Puerto Rico, experienced engine problems and forced-landed at Homestead AFB, Florida. Governors of Connecticut, Minnesota, Montana, Texas and Utah, transferred to another aircraft to continue their journey.

13 September
A People's Liberation Army Air Force Trident 1E crashed in Mongolia under mysterious circumstances during an attempt by Lin Biao and his family to defect to the Soviet Union according to the official view of the PRC. Official PRC accounts claim that the Trident ran out of fuel.

28 September
A U.S. Navy Lockheed P-3 Orion, on patrol over the Sea of Japan, was fired on by a Soviet Sverdlov-class cruiser in international waters. The P-3 was checking a group of Soviet Navy ships cruising off the shore of Japan when crew members reported seeing tracer rounds fired well ahead of the Orion. Immediately following the incident, authorities recalled the P-3 to its base at MCAS Iwakuni, and all surveillance craft were pulled back by five miles.

29 September
A U.S. Air Force Lockheed C-5A Galaxy of the 443d Military Airlift Wing, Altus AFB, Oklahoma, one of six used for training, had its number one (port outer) engine shear off the pylon while advancing take-off power before brake release, setting the wing on fire. The crew evacuated safely within 90 seconds and the fire was extinguished by emergency equipment. The separated engine was projected upward and landed some 250 yards to the Galaxy's rear. The Air Force subsequently grounded six other C-5s with comparable flight hours and cycles. Further investigation found cracks in younger C-5s and the entire fleet was grounded.

12 October
A RAF McDonnell Douglas/Hawker Siddeley F-4M Phantom FGR.2, XV479, 'J', of No. 54 Squadron, on a training mission crashed into a farmhouse near Holstebro, Denmark, as the result of engine failure on take-off killing a woman and her child. Police and rescuers who rushed to the scene could do nothing to save them from the burning house. The crew of two parachuted to safety after encountering problems with engine reheat.

19 October
A Grumman E-2B Hawkeye BuNo 151721, c/n 41, 'NF 013', of VAW-115, and LTV A-7B-4-CV Corsair II, BuNo 154539, c/n B-179, both from the USS Midway, collided over the Sea of Japan while both planes were preparing to land aboard, with the E-2 crashing near the stern of the carrier and killing all five crewmembers. The A-7's pilot ejected safely and was picked up by helicopter from MCAS Iwakuni in good condition.

29 October
A U.S. Air Force Lockheed T-33A Shooting Star crashed near Kadena Air Base, Okinawa, both crewmembers ejecting before the airframe impacted in a sugar cane field; one was seriously injured, the other suffered minor injuries.

November
Two ex-U.S. Navy Sikorsky SH-34J Seabat, BuNos. 143934, c/n 58-698, and 143941, c/n 58-722, obtained by Uruguay's Aviación Naval (Naval Aviation) in October 1971 as A-061 and A-062, collided in midair during a public demonstration over a crowded beach, killing eight and injuring over thirty; both airframes were destroyed.

7 November
A U.S. Air Force McDonnell F-4D-27-MC Phantom II, 65-0653, c/n 1657, 'HO' tailcode, of the 7th TFS, 49th TFW, based at Holloman AFB, New Mexico, and a U.S. Air Force Convair F-106A-130-CO Delta Dart, 59-0125, of the 84th Fighter-Interceptor Squadron, Hamilton AFB, California, collided in mid-air and crashed in isolated areas near Nellis AFB, Nevada. All three crewmembers ejected and survived. The F-4's crewmembers, Maj. Henry J. Viccellio and Maj. James A. Robertson, were uninjured. The Phantom came down 35 miles from Caliente, Nevada. The Delta Dart attempted to return to Nellis but pilot Maj. Clifford L. Lowrey ejected eight miles NE of base.

12 November
Air Force Lockheed C-130E Hercules 69-6578, c/n 4353, of the 61st Tactical Airlift Squadron, 314th Tactical Airlift Wing, crashed due to a fin stall on take-off from Little Rock Air Force Base, Arkansas.

15 November
A U.S. Navy Grumman A-6A Intruder, BuNo. 151563, of VA-42, on a maintenance test flight out of NAS Oceana, Virginia, suffered failure of the drogue chute gun in the pilot's ejection seat, pulling the two ejection seat cables and ejecting Lt. Dalton C. Wright. The bombardier-navigator, Lt. John W. Adair, with no pilot in the aircraft, was forced to eject. The airplane came down 15 miles from Oceana. The Navy investigation later determined that five or six flight accidents and one hangar accident may have been caused by the same problem. One source cites the accident's date as 15 October 1971.

16 November
Republic F-84F-25-GK Thunderstreak, 51-9371, of the 170th Tactical Fighter Squadron, 183d Tactical Fighter Group, Illinois Air National Guard, lost a wing during exercises at the Hardwood Air-to-Ground Weapons Range (R-6904) near Finley, Wisconsin, under the control of Volk Field Air National Guard Base, Wisconsin, caused by the failure of the "milkbone" joining bolt in the main wing, weakened by years of flying. The pilot was killed. "The Guard still had 56 F-84Fs in November 1971 when [this] serious accident occurred due to structural corrosion. The 183rd Tactical Fighter Group, Springfield, Ill., the only ANG unit still equipped with F-84Fs, was programmed for F-4C aircraft, and over 90 percent of the grounded F-84Fs showed signs of stress corrosion. Hence no repairs were carried out. In February 1972, however, the Air Force used two ANG F-84Fs in developing repair procedures that would be offered to the many allied nations using the elderly aircraft." Some 25–30 of the 183d Thunderstreaks were ferried to Eglin AFB, Florida in February 1972, for use as targets on the test ranges although one airframe was later retrieved for the infant Air Force Armament Museum.

18 November
Lockheed U-2A, 56-6952, Article 392, second airframe of the USAF supplementary production, delivered in January 1958, and assigned to the 4080th Strategic Reconnaissance Wing, Laughlin AFB, Texas. Converted to U-2C by November 1966. Assigned to training flights at Davis-Monthan AFB, Arizona, in 1969. The airplane was destroyed this date at Davis-Monthan in a fatal landing accident. The pilot, Capt. John Cunney, landed heavily, wing low, and attempted to go around but stalled and crashed onto the runway.

== 1972 ==
18 January
A General Dynamics F-111E-CF, 68-018, c/n A1-127 / E-28, tailcode 'JS', out of RAF Upper Heyford, crashed on high ground in Scotland; both crewmembers were killed.

19 February
A Lockheed C-130E Hercules 62-1813, c/n 3775, of the 16th Tactical Airlift Training Squadron, collided in mid-air with a Cessna T-37 Tweet from Biggs AFB, Texas, 6 km NE of Little Rock, Arkansas; four persons on the Hercules were killed. The two Tweet pilots ejected safely.

14 March
Two USAF McDonnell Douglas F-4 Phantom IIs collided in mid-air over the town of El Buste, Spain, about 30 miles from the joint US-Spanish base at Zaragoza. F-4D-28-MC, 65-0708, c/n 1753, and F-4D-31-MC, 66-7651, c/n 2231, both of the 23d Tactical Fighter Squadron, 36th Tactical Fighter Wing, were lost, and all four crewmen are killed. Debris showered down onto the town, damaging communications and starting several roof fires, but there were no injuries to townspeople. The aircraft were returning to base in strong winds and broken clouds after a routine gunnery mission. 7651 was the first block 31 airframe.

23 March
A McDonnell F-101B Voodoo of the 119th Fighter Wing, North Dakota Air National Guard, crashed into a house at 1121 26th Street N, Fargo, North Dakota, killing the pilot, 1st Lt Burton D. Humphrey, and injuring the house's occupant, Mrs. Gerald Reed. The weapon systems officer, 2nd Lt Sanford O. Borlaug, ejected from the aircraft and survived with injuries.

31 March
Twenty minutes after take-off from McCoy AFB, Florida, a USAF Boeing B-52D Stratofortress, AF Ser. No. 56-0625, of the 306th Bomb Wing, suffered an in-flight fire in engine number seven which spread to engine number eight and the starboard wing. During an attempted emergency landing at McCoy it crashed a quarter-mile north of Runway 18R/36L and destroyed four homes in a civilian residential area, killing the entire crew of six on board and one civilian on the ground. Eight civilians on the ground were injured.

2 April
US Army UH-1 Huey helicopter 66-15230 crashed near Rock Springs, Wyoming, having taken off that morning from Cheyenne, Wyoming. The aircraft had undergone maintenance at the Corpus Christi Army Depot in Texas and was being ferried to Boise, Idaho. The pilot, Army Captain Bruce R. Larson of Clearwater, Florida, was killed when it went down.

8 April
Hawker Siddeley Andover C.1, XS609, bound for the United Kingdom carrying an 18-man paratroop exhibition team, crashed on take-off at Siena, Italy, digging in its starboard wingtip before skidding 300 yards across the airfield and catching fire. Of the 21 on board, four were killed and four injured, most escaping before the fuel tanks ignited.

14 April
A Marine Corp Reserve pilot was killed in a night accident when he ejected from his McDonnell Douglas A-4C Skyhawk, BuNo 147824, c/n 12588, after tire failure on landing at MCAS El Toro, California. Although he cleared the airframe before it veered off the runway and into a fuel truck, "...authorities said the pilot bounced several times on the runway after ejecting."

15 April
A U.S. Marine Corps Reserve pilot ejected safely from his McDonnell Douglas A-4C Skyhawk, BuNo 148480, c/n 12673, as it caught fire and exploded over the sea at Newport Beach, California in front of hundreds of weekend beachgoers. The aircraft had just left MCAS El Toro when the fire warning light came on.

10 May
Không quân Nhân dân Việt Nam (Vietnam People's Air Force) Shenyang J-6 of the Trung đoàn Không quân Tiêm kích 925 (925th Fighter Regiment) ran out of fuel after a CAP mission, deadsticked from an altitude of 1,400 meters, descended too rapidly, and overran the runway at Yên Bái Air Base, North Vietnam. The plane overturned and exploded, killing the pilot instantly.

4 June
The USAF Thunderbirds suffered their first fatal crash at an air show during Transpo 72 at Dulles International Airport. Major Joe Howard flying Thunderbird 3, McDonnell Douglas F-4E-32-MC Phantom II, 66-0321, experienced a loss of power during a vertical manoeuver, and broke out of the formation just after it completed a wedge roll and was ascending at ~2,500 feet AGL. The aircraft staggered and then descended in a flat attitude with little forward speed. Although Major Howard ejected as the aircraft fell to earth from ~ 1,500 feet slightly nose low, and descended under a good C-9 canopy, winds blew him into the ascending fireball. His parachute melted and he plummeted 200 feet, sustaining fatal injuries on impacting the ground.

18 June
General Dynamics F-111A, 67-0082, c/n A1-127, crashed near Eglin AFB, Florida, shortly after takeoff. The crew lost control of the plane after an external fuel fire and explosion. On attempting to eject, all crewmen were killed.

20 July
Lockheed SR-71A, 61-7978, Article 2029, was lost in a landing accident at Kadena Air Base, Okinawa. The pilot, Capt Dennis K. Bush, and the RSO, Jimmy Fagg, were unhurt.

28 August
Royal Australian Air Force (RAAF) de Havilland Canada DHC-4 Caribou A4-233, carrying three crew and 26 passengers, crashed in a remote valley south of the town of Wau in Papua New Guinea. The wreckage of the aircraft was located on 31 August following an extensive search by military and civilian aircraft. Five of the passengers survived the crash but one of them dies shortly after being rescued.

29 August
A USN Kaman SH-2 Seasprite was lost at sea when it exploded on approach to an aircraft carrier. The crew were identified as Lieut. David Williams, 27 years old, of Lakewood, the pilot; Lieut j.g. Denneth A. Skogrand 25, co-pilot, and Petty Officer' Alfred G. Stymiest, 28, a crewman. Lieutenant Skogrand and Petty Officer Stymiest were from Lakehurst. On the following day, the Navy stated the helicopter had sunk in the Mediterranean area near the coast of Spain, after one of its two engines exploded while the craft was approaching the aircraft carrier Bowen. The helicopter was assigned to an antisubmarine squadron at Lakehurst Naval Air Station.

11 September
A General Dynamics F-111A, 65-5703, c/n A1-21, of the 6510th Test Wing, used in spin tests out of Edwards Air Force Base, California, crashed, impacting in the desert approximately 10 miles from the base in a near vertical dive at roughly 500 knots after the crew ejected in their escape capsule. The crew survived.

10 October
Douglas A-3B Skywarrior, BuNo 138968, of VAQ-33, crashed 1.6 statute miles NW of Holland, Virginia on old Highway 58 in Nansemond (Suffolk, Virginia), off Glen Haven Drive. The crew was killed.

13 October
Uruguayan Air Force Flight 571, a Fairchild Hiller FH-227D, T-571, c/n 572, carrying a rugby union team from Montevideo to a match in Santiago, Chile, crashed in a remote region of the Andes on the Chile-Argentina border. Of the 45 on board, 12 died in the crash itself, five died by the following morning, and one died from his injuries a week later. The survivors were eventually forced to resort to cannibalism to live, feeding off the bodies of the dead preserved by the freezing temperatures. On 12 December, the remaining survivors sent three of their own to find help. After sending one of the party back to the crash site to preserve rations, the remaining two found help. The 14 survivors remaining at the crash site were rescued in a mission that ended on 23 December. The story was to spawn a critically acclaimed book in 1974, along with several film adaptations.

16 October
A USAF Convair F-106B-50-CO Delta Dart, 57-2528, of the 4756th Air Defense Wing, Tyndall AFB, Florida, was lost in a crash. Previously this aircraft had survived a mid-air collision on 4 May 1965 with F-106A-80-CO, 57-4721, both assigned to the 539th Fighter-Interceptor Squadron, McGuire AFB, New Jersey, the second fighter being lost and 2528 recovering to NAFEC Atlantic City, New Jersey.

19 October
A USAF Convair F-106B-55-CO Delta Dart, 57-2538, c/n 8-27-32, of the Air Defense Weapons Center, Tyndall AFB, Florida, was lost in a crash, pilot KWF. This second accident in three days was to be the last fatal Tyndall accident until the loss of a Lockheed T-33A on 30 May 1975.

30 October
First developmental model Hawker Siddeley P.1127, XP972, crashes at RAF Tangmere.

24 November
U.S. Air Force McDonnell RF-4C-24-MC Phantom II, 65-0825, c/n 1227, and McDonnell RF-4C-32-MC Phantom II, 66-0471, c/n 2651, of the 62d Tactical Reconnaissance Squadron, 363d Tactical Reconnaissance Wing, Shaw AFB, South Carolina, collided in mid-air over the Atlantic Ocean about 30 miles off of Pawley's Island at approximately 1450 hrs, during a defensive combat manoeuvering mission. Two crewmen from 0471, Capt. B. W. Stechlein and Capt. R. L. Jaeger ejected, and were recovered 27 miles out to sea by Bell UH-1N Huey, Save 53, of Detachment 8, 44th ARRSq, out of Myrtle Beach AFB, and were taken to the base hospital, but two others aboard 0825, including one officer of HQ 9th Air Force, Shaw AFB, Lt. Col. Edward Cole, Jr., were lost, the second being Maj. Edward W. Tate

5 December
During an Aerospace Defense Command night training mission, Convair F-102A-80-CO Delta Dagger, 56-1517, of the 157th Fighter-Interceptor Squadron, South Carolina Air National Guard, McEntire Air National Guard Base, South Carolina, collided with Lockheed C-130E Hercules, 64-0558, of the 318th Special Operations Squadron, out of Pope AFB, North Carolina, during a simulated interception, over the Bayboro area of Horry County, east of Myrtle Beach, South Carolina. One person in the Delta Dagger was killed and all twelve on board the Hercules perished. Some press reports list Conway, South Carolina, west of the crash site, as the location.

== 1973 ==
22 January
Convair F-102A-75-CO Delta Dagger, 56-1321, of the 57th FIS, crashed into the ocean about 30 km (17 NM) from Keflavik, Iceland. This brought an end to 58 months of accident-free flying for the 57th. There are no other details regarding this accident at this editing.

7 February
A US Navy LTV A-7E-8-CV Corsair II, BuNo 157539, c/n E-195, of VA-195 piloted by Lt. Robert Lee Ward, 28, one of two on a routine training flight to Sacramento, California from NAS Lemoore near Fresno, California, crashed at 2013 hrs. in Alameda, after breaking formation at 28,000 feet for unexplained reasons. The fighter struck a four-storey Tahoe Apartments building at 1814 Central Avenue in the city center with fire spreading to other structures, killing the pilot and ten civilians and injuring 26 further civilians. A Navy inquiry found evidence of a cockpit fire involving the pilot's oxygen hose, and that the in-flight blaze was "very near" Ward's oxygen mask. Speculation that smoking could have caused it, but no proof thereof was established. Lawsuits for more than $700,000 were filed in connection with the disaster, including a $500,000 damage action filed in Alameda County Superior Court by owner of the demolished 36-unit Tahoe Apartments.

8 March
A Douglas EC-47 Skytrain, US Army tail number O-50781, built as C-47B-10-DK, USAAF 43-49137, c/n 14593/26398, to US Navy as R4D-6, BuNo 50781, (R4D-6s redesignated C-47J in 1962) carrying members of the US Army Golden Knights parachute team on a recruiting tour crashed and exploded at ~0900 hrs. in a muddy cornfield on the Basil Perry farm near Silk Hope, North Carolina, while en route to their first performance of the season, at Overland Park, Kansas, killing 11 team members, two flight crew and the crew chief. The flight had departed Fort Bragg, North Carolina, at 0808 hrs. The accident was found to have been caused by overloading due to the installation of a heavy metal plate floor, installed in Vietnam, but not entered in the airplane's logbook.

8 March
Three F-4 Phantom IIs of the Blue Angels flight demonstration squadron collided during a practice session, crashing in the desert near El Centro, California. All three pilots ejected successfully and survived.

8 March
"An on-ground collision between two tanker jets at Lockbourne Air Force Base near Columbus, Ohio, killed two crewmen and injured another seriously. The jets, two $10 million KC135s used for airborne refueling, collided as they both moved into take-off positions. One plane was loaded with fuel. One was extensively damaged by fire; the other's interior was burned."

12 April
A U.S. Navy Lockheed P-3C-125-LO Orion, BuNo 157332, c/n 185-5547, of VP-47 and a Convair 990-30A-5, N711NA, '711', "Galileo", c/n 30-10-1, (formerly N5601G of American Airlines), belonging to NASA, collided while on final approach to NAS Moffett Field in Sunnyvale, California and crashed short of the runway. The planes fell on the Sunnyvale Municipal Golf Course and 16 of the 17 people aboard the two planes were killed.

June 20
An early U.S. Navy Grumman F-14A Tomcat no. 6 flying Mach 0.95 (617 kn) at 5,000 feet (1,500 m) at 0 g shot itself down in the Pacific Missile Test Range near Point Mugu, California while testing an AIM-7E-2 Sparrow missile that launched improperly, spewing debris into the left engine. The plane caught fire and lost control forcing the crew to eject. The crewmen were rescued in good condition.

4 August
First of two prototype Boeing YQM-94A Compass Cope B long-range remotely piloted vehicles (RPV), possibly serial 70-1839, crashed during its second test flight. The U.S. Air Force consequently decided not to order the Compass Copes into production. The second prototype is now on display at the National Museum of the United States Air Force, Dayton, Ohio.

22 August
RAF McDonnell Douglas/Hawker Siddeley F-4M Phantom FGR.2, XV427, 'X', of 17 Squadron, RAF Brüggen, flew into high ground at Siegen, West Germany, killing both crewmembers. The airplane had fallen out of a four-ship formation during a turn and the pilot attempted to rejoin by 'cutting a corner', but impacted rising terrain.

28 August
C-141A, 63-8077 crashed on final approach for landing, impacting level terrain in a slight descent and was destroyed. Seven crew and 17 passengers were killed. A navigator was thrown clear and survived.

19 September
A U.S. Navy Grumman A-6A Intruder, BuNo 155721, 'NJ', of VA-128, out of NAS Whidbey Island, Washington, crashed in the Oregon desert, ~25 miles SE of Christmas Valley, Oregon, during a low level night training mission. The pilot Lt. Alan G. Koehler, 27, and navigator Lt. Cdr. Philip D. duHamel, 33, were killed while flying (KWF). On 14 June 2007, the Bureau of Land Management (BLM) officially declared the crash-scene a historic Federal government site at a Flag Day ceremony. An interpretive plaque was unveiled during this event reflecting this designation and depicting the historical significance of the location.

24 September
RAF Hawker Siddeley Harrier GR.1A, XV739, 'V', of 1 Squadron, crashed at Episkopi Cantonment, Cyprus, during the climbing transition from hover during a display rehearsal. The pilot ejected.

22 October
U.S. Navy Carrier Air Wing Five incurred six fatalities in night operations when Ling-Temco-Vought A-7A-4b-CV Corsair II BuNo 153204, 'NF-412', of VA-56, flown by Lt (jg) Everett E. Goodrow, and Grumman EA-6A Prowler, BuNo 156980, c/n I-449, 'RM-611', of USMC VMCJ-1 Detachment 101, crewed by 1st Lts. Jot Eve and David L. Moody, fly into the sea 127 miles (204 km) east of Okinawa 11 miles (18 km) aft of USS Midway during CVW-5's initial night qualification period. "Attempting to undertake a no-radio, no navigational aids (NORDO/NONAV) approach in bad weather, the crew found themselves struggling to find 'the boat'. On hearing their radio transmissions, Lt (jg) Goodrow found the EA-6A and had the jet form up on his wing for the approach back to the ship. They shot a teardrop pattern directly over the carrier and had turned inbound to the vessel on its course when both simultaneously disappeared from radar screens. None of the aircrew attempted to eject and there were no radio transmissions made from either jet. It was subsequently assumed that both pilots had flown into the water or collided and then hit the water at about the time they would have slowed to extend their flaps, slats, and landing gear." Subsequently, in a search attempt, an H-3 'Angel', Sikorsky SH-3G Sea King, BuNo 149893, launched forward of the island, contrary to NATOPS standards, as there was no point of reference in the dark, and at high power flew straight into the water. Three of four crewmen, Lt (jg)s William J. Bates and George A. Wildridge and ADJ1 Richard H. Hall, were lost. This was the last USMC EA-6A hull loss.

12 November
U.S. Navy Ling-Temco-Vought A-7A-4c-CV Corsair II, BuNo 153256, 'NF', of VA-93, assigned to USS Midway, crashed into Mount Fuji during a night training flight out of NAF Atsugi, killing Lt. Richard L. "Sparky" Pierson. According to fellow aviator Ens. George Zolla, of VF-161, Pierson "thought he was cleared to a lower altitude than he really was." This airframe saw combat in 1968 with VA-82.

16 November
While on reserve station south of Crete, a U.S. Marine Corps Boeing-Vertol CH-46 Sea Knight from USS Guadalcanal (LPH-7) lost engine power during a routine flight while hovering above the USS Barry. The helicopter, with crewmen aboard, crashed into the destroyer's ASROC deck, rolled over the starboard side, and almost immediately sank. While no-one on Barry was injured, only two of the three helicopter crewmen were rescued by the ship's Motor Whale Boat.

10 December
RAF English Electric Lightning F.3, XP738, 'E', of 111 Squadron, was written off when the undercarriage collapsed upon landing at RAF Wattisham, Suffolk. The airframe was stripped for spares before being consigned to the dump there.

== 1974 ==
23 January
An F-4C jet fighter crashed on the Gila Bend Gunnery Range in Gila Bend, Arizona, killing U.S. Air Force Maj. Jerry D. Whitlock and USAF Second Lieut. Jerry W. Smith.

24 January
A Togolese Air Force Douglas C-47 Skytrain, 5V-MAG, crashed during approach near the village of Sarakawa, northern Togo, killing several high-ranking military personnel. The President of Togo, Gnassingbé Eyadéma (1935–2005), was the sole survivor.

8 February
A U.S. Air Force Boeing B-52G Stratofortress, 58-0174, of the 744th BS, 456th BW, veered off the runway during night take-off from Beale AFB, California, skidded 1,500 feet (460 m) through a muddy field before overturning, upon which it was destroyed by four massive explosions and fire. One crew member, the first pilot, was thrown free with severe burns, but seven others perished.

9 February
Two U.S. Air Force Republic F-105 Thunderchiefs of the 457th TFTW (TH tailcode), Carswell AFB, Texas, collided in mid-air, downing one aircraft ~1 mile (1.6 km) from Holliday, Texas; its pilot ejected, suffering a broken right leg on landing, and was recovered by helicopter. The second F-105 returned to Carswell despite damage, its pilot uninjured. 1st Lt. Hayes C. Kirby in F-105D-10-RE, 60-5375, had a violent pitch up and roll in the aircraft and hit his leader in F-105D-10-RE, 60-0513. Kirby ejected in a flat spin while the leader airplane landed safely.

9 February
A U.S. Air Force North American T-39A Sabreliner, 60-3506, returning to McClellan AFB, California, collided with a USAF Boeing NKC-135A Stratotanker at 23,000 feet (7,000 m), over Peterson Field, Colorado, killing all seven on board the T-39. The Sabreliner had experienced landing gear trouble, rendezvoused with the NKC-135 for a look-over and accidentally struck the rear fuselage and fin of the Boeing. The NKC-135, en route from Seattle, Washington, to Kirtland AFB, New Mexico, landed safely.

5 March
A U.S. Navy North American RA-5C Vigilante, BuNo 149296, of RVAH-3, crashed in the Gulf of Mexico 35 miles (56 km) W of Tampa, Florida, after an in-flight fire. Both crew ejected; two opened parachutes were observed descending, but only the navigator was recovered, by a fishing boat.

5 March
A USAF Boeing KC-135A Stratotanker, 57–1500, of the 91st Air Refuelling Squadron, 384th Air Refuelling Wing, crashed and burned shortly after take-off from McConnell AFB, Kansas, killing two of seven crew. Air Force spokesmen reported that the aircraft was carrying 136,000 pounds (62,000 kg) of fuel when it crashed 3,000 feet (910 m) from the main runway, after it apparently lost power.

5 March
A U.S. Air Force Boeing KC-135A Stratotanker of the 7th Air Refuelling Squadron, 7th Bomb Wing, en route from Eielson AFB, Alaska to its homebase at Carswell AFB, Texas, suffered an explosive decompression when a small window blew out at 35,000 feet (11,000 m) at 1630 hrs. EST about 40 miles (64 km) SE of Fort Nelson, British Columbia. One passenger of the 25 aboard died from the effects of the rapid decompression; the others and the crew of eight were unharmed. The tanker made an emergency landing at a Canadian Armed Forces Base at Edmonton, Alberta.

16 March
A U.S. Navy A-7 Corsair II departs NAS Miramar, California, for USS Ranger (CV-61) with wings folded, crashed into a row of houses in a San Diego suburb. Lt. Robert F. Schreiber (also reported as Schreiver), 29, ejected.

31 July
A U.S. Navy Grumman TE-2A Hawkeye, BuNo 150530, c/n 10, 'GE 725', of RVAW-120, based at NAS Norfolk, Virginia, crashed on take-off from CGAS Elizabeth City, North Carolina, during a touch-and-go when the port engine's auto-feather system failed. The pilot lost directional control and the aircraft failed to gain altitude, striking a maintenance facility and triggering a fire in a fibreglass and upholstery shop. The instructor pilot was trapped in wreckage; three civilians were killed, while the student pilot and 12–18 others were injured.

9 August
RAF McDonnell Douglas/Hawker Siddeley F-4M Phantom FGR.2, XV493, 'F', of No. 41 Squadron was involved in a fatal mid-air collision with a Piper Pawnee crop-sprayer, G-ASVK, over Fordham Fen near Downham Market, Norfolk, England. The two Phantom and one Pawnee crewmembers were all killed while flying.

18 August
Lockheed C-141A Starlifter, 65-0274, of the 437th MAW, Charleston AFB, South Carolina, hit Mount Potosi at the 19,000-foot (5,800 m) level, ~17 miles (27 km) from destination, John F. Kennedy International Airport, La Paz, Bolivia, killing its crew of seven.

1 September
The Sikorsky S-67 Blackhawk company demonstrator N671SA crashed while attempting to recover from a roll at too low an altitude during its display at the Farnborough Air Show, United Kingdom, killing its two crewmembers.

15 September
On the third day of Naval Preliminary Evaluation (NPE-1) testing, the first prototype Sikorsky YCH-53E Sea Stallion, BuNo 159121, was destroyed at the Sikorsky plant at Stratford, Connecticut, when it rolled onto its side and burned after one of the main rotor blades detached during a ground run. It had first flown on 1 March 1974. The second prototype was grounded while the accident was investigated, flight testing resuming on 24 January 1975.

== See also ==
- List of accidents and incidents involving military aircraft
- List of C-130 Hercules crashes
