= Robert R. Korfhage =

American computer scientist (1930–1998)

Robert Roy Korfhage
- Born: 2 December 1930; Fulton, Oswego County, New York, United States
- Died: 20 November 1998 (aged 67)
- Education: University of Michigan
- Known for: Information retrieval
- Scientific career
- Workplaces: North Carolina State University; Purdue University; Southern Methodist University; University of Pittsburgh School of Information Sciences
- Doctoral advisor: Bernard Galler

Robert Roy Korfhage (December 2, 1930 – November 20, 1998) was an American computer scientist, famous for his contributions to information retrieval and several textbooks.

He was son of Dr. Roy Korfhage who was a chemist at Nestlé in Fulton, Oswego County, New York. Korfhage earned his bachelor's degree (1952) in engineering mathematics at University of Michigan, while working part-time at United Aircraft and Transport Corporation in East Hartford as programmer. At the same university, he earned a master's degree and Ph.D. (1962) in mathematics, his PhD dissertation being On Systems of Distinct Representatives for Several Collections of Sets advised by Bernard Galler (1962).

Korfhage taught mathematics at North Carolina State University (1962–64), Purdue University (1964–70), Southern Methodist University (1970–86) and the University of Pittsburgh School of Information Sciences (1986–98).

Korfhage's research focused on graph theory and information retrieval. For instance, his Information Storage and Retrieval (1997) was winner of American Society for Information Science and Technology Best information science book award (1998).

In his later years, he worked on new ways of information visualization and also genetic algorithms to optimize text queries.

He died of cancer in Pittsburgh.

== Books ==
- 1966: Logic and Algorithms, Wiley
- 1970: (with Harley Flanders) Calculus, Academic Press
- 1974: (with Harley Flanders and Justin Jesse Price) A Second Course in Calculus, Academic Press
- 1984: Discrete Computational Structures, Academic Press
- 1987: (with Norman E. Gibbs) Principles of Data Structures and Algorithms with Pascal, William C. Brown Publications
- 1997: Information Storage and Retrieval, Wiley.
