= Metta Spencer =

Canadian sociologist, writer and activist (born 1931)

- Born: July 29, 1931 (age 95)

Academic background
- Education: University of California, Berkeley (Ph.D.)

Metta Spencer (born August 29, 1931) is a Canadian sociologist, writer, peace researcher, and activist. She is Professor Emeritus of sociology at the University of Toronto Mississauga.

== Biography ==
After completing a Ph.D. in sociology in 1969 at the University of California, Berkeley, Spencer joined the Department of Sociology at the University of Toronto’s Erindale College in 1971. She taught regularly in the university’s Peace and Conflict Studies Program, which she founded in 1989 and coordinated until her retirement in 1997. In 1976 Spencer authored the Foundations of Modern Sociology textbook, which was subsequently published in four American and seven Canadian editions.

Spencer has specialized in peace and war studies, and has been active in the Canadian peace movement. As the founding president and director of the Canadian Disarmament Information Service (CANDIS), she published the monthly Peace Calendar from 1983 to 1985, when the publication changed to magazine format and took the name Peace Magazine. In 2009, Spencer organized the Zero Nuclear Weapons public forum in Toronto, jointly sponsored by four major Canadian peace organizations with which she has been involved since the mid-80s: Physicians for Global Survival, Canadian Voice of Women for Peace, the Nobel Peace Prize laureate organization Pugwash Conferences on Science and World Affairs, and Science for Peace.

She has also extensively researched peace and conflict in the former Soviet Union and Eastern Europe. In 1997, she organized "The Lessons of Yugoslavia," a three-day Science for Peace conference at the University of Toronto. In 2011, she published The Russian Quest for Peace and Democracy, the culmination of 28 years of research and hundreds of interviews with Russian politicians and activists. She argues that Western peace activists' influence on Russians, including Mikhail Gorbachev, helped end the Cold War more so than pressure from the US or NATO.

More recently, Spencer has become involved in climate change activism (by chairing since 2007 a Science for Peace committee to study and campaign for carbon taxation policy) and has researched edutainment, or social change through storytelling. In her book Two Aspirins and a Comedy: How Television Can Enhance Health and Society (2006), she argues that television could be a force for health and social change.

== Awards ==
- Confederation Medal awarded by Governor-General for Service to Canada, 1992
- Global Citizen Award, United Nations, 1995
- United Nations Association in Canada Award, 1999

== Books ==
- Adolescent Prejudice (Co-author with Charles Y. Glock, Robert Wuthnow, and Jane Piliavin). New York: Harper and Row, 1975.
- Foundations of Modern Sociology. Englewood Cliffs, N.J.: Prentice-Hall, 1976. (published in four American and seven Canadian editions)
- Two Aspirins and a Comedy: How Television Can Enhance Health and Society. Boulder, Colorado: Paradigm Publishers, 2006.
- The Russian Quest for Peace and Democracy. Lanham, Maryland: Lexington Press, 2010.

=== Books edited ===
- Research in Social Movements, Conflict, and Change, Vol. 13. Greenwich, Connecticut: JAI Press, 1991.
- World Security: The New Challenge (Co-editor with Carl G. Jacobsen, Morris Miller, and Eric Tollefson). Pugwash Canada. Toronto: Dundurn, 1994.
- Women in Post-Communism: Research on Russia and Eastern Europe, Vol. 2 (Co-editor with Barbara Wejnert, with the assistance of Slobodan Drakulic). Greenwich, Connecticut: JAI Press, 1997.
- Separatism: Democracy and Disintegration. Lanham, Maryland: Rowman and Littlefield, 1998.
- The Lessons of Yugoslavia: Research on Russia and Eastern Europe, Vol. 3. Amsterdam, London: JAI Press, Elsevier, 2000.
