= Ruth Fawcett =

Ruth Fawcett (born 13 April 1961 in Malvern, England) is the daughter of British-Canadian physicist Eric Fawcett, and the sister-in-law of historian Roger Sarty. She is the author of Nuclear Pursuits, the biography of Canadian nuclear-industry pioneer Wilfrid Bennett Lewis.

Fawcett currently lives with her family in Ottawa, Canada. Her second cousin, Samuel Fawcett, is a NOVA teacher in Osaka, Japan.

== Bibliography ==
- Fawcett, Ruth (1994). Nuclear Pursuits: The Scientific Biography of Wilfrid Bennett Lewis. Montreal: McGill-Queen's University Press. ISBN 0-7735-1186-5.
