= Bennett Lewis =

Canadian nuclear scientist (1908–1987)

Wilfrid Bennett Lewis
- Born: June 24, 1908; Castle Carrock, Cumberland, England
- Died: January 10, 1987 (aged 78); Deep River, Ontario
- Awards: Order of Canada; Order of the British Empire; Fellow of the Royal Society

Wilfrid Bennett Lewis, CC CBE FRS FRSC (June 24, 1908 – January 10, 1987) was a Canadian nuclear scientist and administrator, and was centrally involved in the development of the CANDU reactor.

Born in Castle Carrock, Cumberland, England, he earned a doctorate in physics at Cavendish Laboratory, University of Cambridge in 1934, and continued his research in nuclear physics there until 1939. From 1939 until 1946, he was with the Air Ministry, becoming Chief Superintendent of the Telecommunications Research Establishment. In 1946, he moved to Canada, to become director of the division of Atomic Energy Research at the National Research Council of Canada in Chalk River, Ontario. From 1952 until 1963, he was vice president, research and development, of the Atomic Energy of Canada Limited, and was senior vice president, science, from 1963 until 1973.

Starting in the mid-1940s, Lewis directed the development and championed the CANDU system, with its natural uranium fuel moderated by heavy water (deuterium oxide) to control neutron flux. The CANDU has proven its value for commercial power applications, showing outstanding efficiency and safety records. AECL also became a world leader in the production of radioisotopes for medical purposes.

From 1973 until his death in 1987, Lewis was a Distinguished Professor of Science at Queen's University.

From 1955 until 1987, he was the Canadian Representative on the United Nations Scientific Advisory Committee.

In 1994 a biography of Lewis entitled Nuclear Pursuits was published Ruth Fawcett.

== Honours ==
- In 1945 he was made a Fellow of the Royal Society of London.
- In 1946 Lewis was appointed as a Commander of the Most Excellent Order of the British Empire
- In 1964 he received an honorary Doctor of Science from the University of Saskatchewan.
- In 1966 he was the first recipient Outstanding Achievement Award of the Public Service of Canada.
- In 1967 he was made a Companion of the Order of Canada.
- In 1967 he received the United States Atoms for Peace Award
- In 1972 he won the Royal Medal of the Royal Society of London
- In 1981 he received the United States Department of Energy Enrico Fermi Award
