= Norman E. Gibbs =

American mathematician and computer scientist

Norman E. Gibbs (November 27, 1941 – April 25, 2002) was an American software engineer, scholar and educational leader.

He studied to a B.Sc. in mathematics at Ursinus College (1964) and M.Sc. (1966) and Ph.D. (1969) in Computer Science at Purdue University, advised by Robert R. Korfhage. His research area was cycle generation, an area in graph theory. Gibbs joined the faculty at Bowdoin College in Maine, Arizona State University and College of William and Mary (mathematics) in Virginia before moving to Pittsburgh, joining Carnegie Mellon University as professor of computer science and becoming the first director of the educational program at the Software Engineering Institute (1987–97). Since then he was chief information officer at Guilford College in Greensboro and University of Connecticut, jointly serving as professor of Operations and Information management. He eventually worked for Ball State University as chair of computer science (2000–02).

== Articles ==
- A cycle generation algorithm for finite undirected linear graphs, in Jnl. of the ACM, 16(4):564-68, 1969.
- Tridiagonalization by permutations, in Comm. of the ACM, 17(1):20-24, 1974 (with William G. Poole, jr.)
- Basic cycle generation, in Comm. of the ACM, 18(5):275-76, 1975
- An Algorithm for Reducing the Bandwidth and Profile of a Sparse Matrix, in SIAM Jnr. of Numerical Analysis, 13(2):236-250, 1976 (with W. G. Poole and Paul K. Stockmeyer
- A hybrid profile reduction algorithm, ACM Trans. on Math. Softw., 2(4):378-387, 1976
- An introductory computer science course for all majors, ACM SIGCSE, 9(3):34-38, 1977
- A model curriculum for a liberal arts degree in computer science, Comm. of the ACM, 29(3):202-210, 1986 (with Allen B. Tucker)
- A Master of Software Engineering Curriculum: Recommendations from the Software Engineering Institute, IEEE Computer, 22(9):59-71, 1989 (With Gary A. Ford)
- Software Engineering and Computer Science: The Impending Split?, in Educ. & Computing. 7(1-2):111-17, 1991

== Books ==
- Principles of data structures and algorithms with Pascal (William C. Brown Publ.,1987). With Robert R. Korfhage
- Software Engineering Education: The Educational Needs of the Software Community (editor, with Richard E. Farley, 1987)
