= Teach-in =

Educational forum focused on action around political issues

A teach-in is similar to a general educational forum on any complicated issue, usually an issue involving current political affairs. The main difference between a teach-in and a seminar is the refusal to limit the discussion to a specific time frame or a strict academic scope. Teach-ins are meant to be practical, participatory, and oriented toward action. While they include experts lecturing on their area of expertise, discussion and questions from the audience are welcome, even mid-lecture. "Teach-ins" were popularized during the U.S. government's involvement in Vietnam. The first teach-in, which was held overnight at the University of Michigan in March 1965, began with a discussion of the Vietnam War draft and ended in the early morning with a speech by philosopher Arnold Kaufman.

== The first teach-in ==
The concept of the teach-in was developed by anthropologist Marshall Sahlins of the University of Michigan at Ann Arbor during a meeting on March 17, 1965. Previously, around 50 faculty members had signed onto a one-day teaching strike to oppose the Vietnam War. About a dozen of these faculty members, including William A. Gamson, Jack Rothman, Eric Wolf, Arnold Kaufman, Frithjof Bergmann and Roger Lind, reconsidered the strike and gathered to discuss alternative ways to protest the war in the face of strong opposition to the strike from the Michigan legislature and governor as well as the university president. The New York Times Magazine summed up how Sahlins arrived at the idea: "They say we're neglecting our responsibilities as teachers. Let's show them how responsible we feel. Instead of teaching out, we'll teach in—all night."

The term teach-in was a variant of another form of protest, the sit-in. Later variants included the die-in, bed-in, lie-in, and draft card turn-in.

This first teach-in was organized by faculty and Students for a Democratic Society at the University of Michigan at Ann Arbor on March 24–25, 1965. Michigan governor George Romney and other politicians still opposed the event. The teach-in was attended by about 3,500 people and consisted of debates, lectures, movies, and musical events aimed at protesting the war. Michigan faculty members such as Anatol Rapoport and Charles Tilly were also involved. Women students who attended received special permission to stay out during the night. Bomb threats emptied the hall three times over the course of the teach-in, sending participants into the freezing cold, where they continued their activities. Other Michigan students in the Young Republicans organization picketed the event, protesting "anti-American policy." The teach-in ended the next morning, concluding with a 600-person rally on the steps of the library.

== Subsequent antiwar teach-ins ==
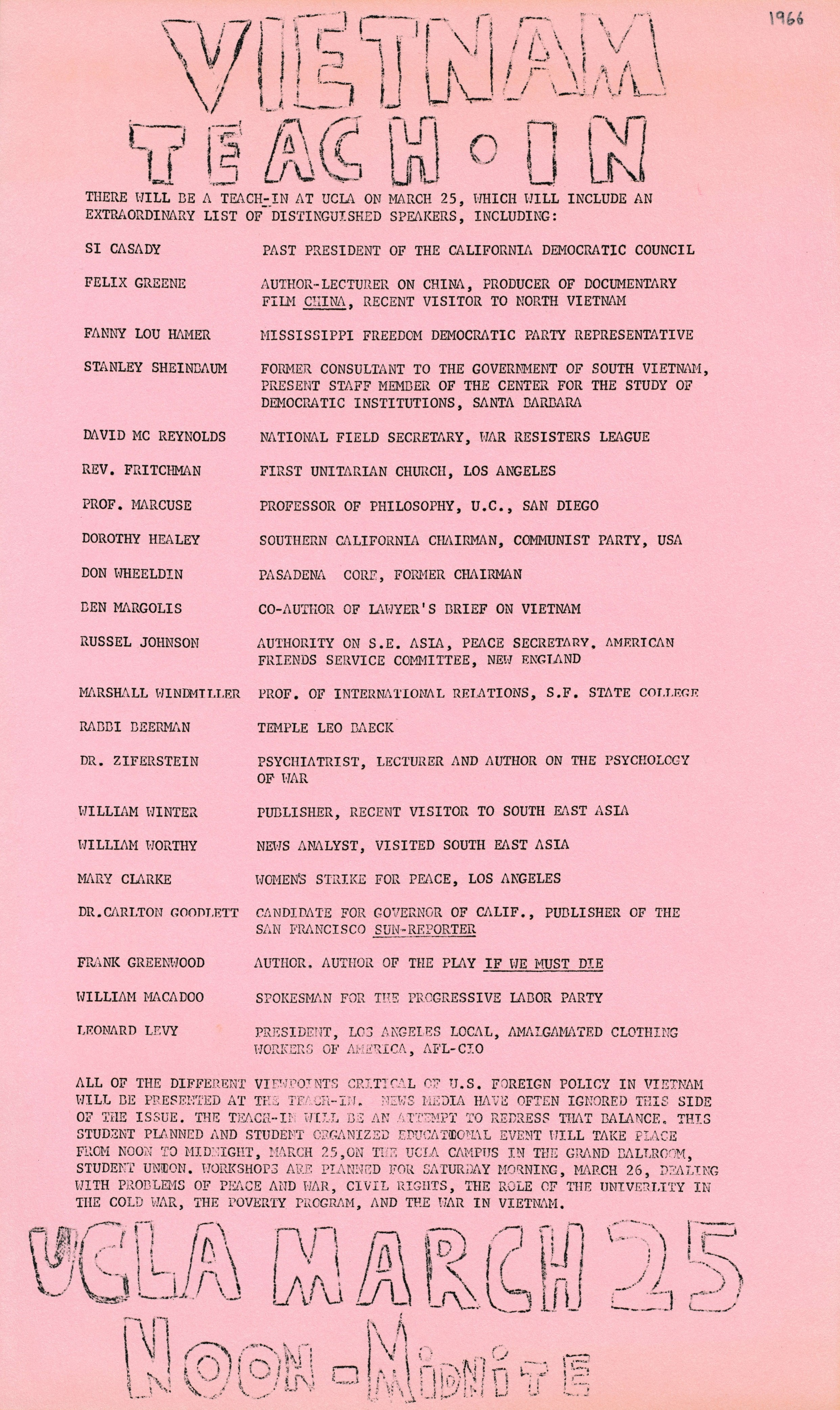
UCLA Vietnam Day Committee leaflet promoting its 25 March 1966 antiwar teach-in

The Michigan teach-in received national press, including an article published in the March 25, 1965 issue of the New York Times. It went on to inspire 35 more teach-ins on college campuses within the next week. By the end of the year, there had been teach-ins at 120 campuses. Antiwar teach-ins were held until the end of the Vietnam War. These included:

- Columbia University, March 26, 1965
- University of Wisconsin, April 1, 1965
- University of Pennsylvania, Swarthmore College, and Temple University (coordinated), April 7, 1965
- Rutgers University, April 23, 1965
- Boston University, May 5, 1965
- National Teach-In (televised), Sheraton Park Hotel, Washington DC, May 15, 1965
- U.C. Berkeley, May 21–22, 1965
- Kent State University, spring 1965
- Harvard University, spring 1965
- Goucher College, spring 1965
- Marist College, spring 1965
- Principia College, spring 1965
- Flint Junior College, spring 1965
- Case Western University, spring 1965
- Berkeley, October 15, 1965
- UCLA, March 25, 1966
- New York University, March 30, 1971
- First Congregation Church, Washington, October 25–26, 1971
- Brandeis University, April 1975

Not all college students at the time were antiwar protesters, however. At many teach-ins, pro-war students showed up to protest or signed letters of support for college administration, including at Kent State University, the University of Wisconsin, and Yale University.

=== Teach-in at U.C. Berkeley ===
The largest Vietnam teach-in was held on May 21–22, 1965 at U.C. Berkeley. The event was organized by the newly formed Vietnam Day Committee (VDC), an organizing group founded by ex-grad student Jerry Rubin, Professor Stephen Smale, and others. The event was held on a playing field where Zellerbach Auditorium is now located. Over the course of 36 hours, an estimated 30,000 people attended the event. The State Department was invited by the VDC to send a representative, but declined. UC Berkeley professors Eugene Burdick and Robert A. Scalapino, who had agreed to speak in defense of President Johnson's handling of the war, withdrew at the last minute. An empty chair was set aside on the stage with a sign reading "Reserved for the State Department" taped to the back.

Participants in the event included Dr. Benjamin Spock; veteran socialist leader Norman Thomas; novelist Norman Mailer; independent journalist I. F. Stone and historian Isaac Deutscher. Other speakers included: California Assemblymen Willie Brown, William Stanton and John Burton; Dave Dellinger (political activist); James Aronson (National Guardian magazine); philosopher Alan Watts; comedian Dick Gregory; Paul Krassner (editor, The Realist); M.S. Arnoni (philosopher, writer, political activist); Edward Keating (publisher, Ramparts Magazine); Felix Greene (author and film producer); Isadore Zifferstein (psychologist); Stanley Scheinbaum (Center for the Study of Democratic Institutions); Paul Jacobs (journalist and anti-nuclear activist); Hal Draper (Marxist writer and a socialist activist); Levi Laud (Progressive Labor Movement); Si Casady (California Democratic Council); George Clark (British Committee of 100/Campaign for Nuclear Disarmament); Robert Pickus (Turn Toward Peace); Bob Moses (Student Nonviolent Coordinating Committee); Jack Barnes (National Chair of the Young Socialist Alliance); Mario Savio (Free Speech Movement); Paul Potter (Students for a Democratic Society); and Mike Meyerson (national head of the Du Bois Clubs of America). British philosopher and pacifist Bertrand Russell sent a taped message to the teach-in.

Faculty participants included Professor Staughton Lynd (Yale); Professor Gerald Berreman; and Professor Aaron Wildavsky. Performers included folk singer Phil Ochs; the improv group The Committee; and others. The proceedings were recorded and broadcast, many of them live, by Berkeley FM station KPFA. Excerpts from the speeches by Lynd, Wildavsky, Scheer, Potter, Krassner, Moses (credited as Bob Parris, his middle name), Spock, Stone, Gregory, and Arnoni were released the following year as an LP by Folkways Records, FD5765. An online archive, including recordings and transcripts of many of the participants, is maintained by the Library of the University of California, Berkeley.

=== Scrutiny and surveillance ===
As part of the antiwar movement at the time, teach-ins were regarded by the FBI (then directed by J. Edgar Hoover) and the Lyndon B. Johnson administration as potentially dangerous to national interests. At a teach-in organized by the Universities Committee on Problems of War and Peace, 13 undercover agents attended and identified students, faculty, speakers, and activists by name and affiliation, passing the information to the FBI. A Senate study, "The Anti-Vietnam Agitation and the Teach-In Movement," was prepared in October 1965 by the Subcommittee to Investigate the Administration of the Internal Security Act and Other Internal Security Laws. This report stated, "In reality, the great majority of teach-ins (there were a few notable exceptions to this rule) have had absolutely nothing in common with the procedures of fair debate or the process of education. In practice, they were a combination of an indoctrination session, a political protest demonstration, an endurance contest, and a variety show." The study claimed that teach-ins were a form of Communist activity, noting that "people of known Communist background were frequently involved."

=== Legacy of antiwar teach-ins ===
"[The] stroke of genius out there in Michigan ... put the debate on the map for the whole academic community. And you could not be an intellectual after those teach-ins and not think a lot and express yourself and defend your ideas about Vietnam." —Carl Oglesby, organizer at the 1965 University of Michigan teach-in and then-president of SDS, quoted in The War Within, Tom Wells

"The 1965 teach-ins were significant, in fact, more because of their very organization than for their novelty or the extent of student protest. They legitimized dissent at the outset of the war. The vacuum of understanding which they exposed created a market for information. … Moreover, the 1965 teach-ins served to identify a coterie of academic experts who challenged national policy, helped to make connections among them, and established them as an alternative source of information and understanding." —An American Ordeal: The Antiwar Movement of the Vietnam Era, Charles DeBenedetti

"In raising anti-war consciousness in the nation as a whole, far beyond the academic community, the teach-ins were an historic turning point in the politics of the Vietnam War. ... This liberal bias of the teach-in movement, however, was one of the too-many-reasons-to-recount-here why the academic community lost its leadership role as fast as it had gained it. Part of the problem was that as soon as the teach-in movement politicized the counterculture, the latter began to counterculturalize the politics. Hence the tension between the political and the carnival in the student left as it moved from liberal protest to radical resistance and campus violence... Alienated by the left students’ tactics, the largely liberal anti-war public reverted to traditional modes of protest, although the marches and demonstrations were now massive in scale, varied in social composition and increasingly joined by establishment politicians." —Marshall Sahlins in Anthropology Today, 2009

Teach-ins were one activity of the New Left. Students, faculty, and other activists involved in the teach-ins would go on to organize other antiwar protests, including the 20,000-person rally at the Washington Monument in April 1965. Teach-ins have continued through the decades since 1965 in response to other national crises, including climate change.

== Modern events ==
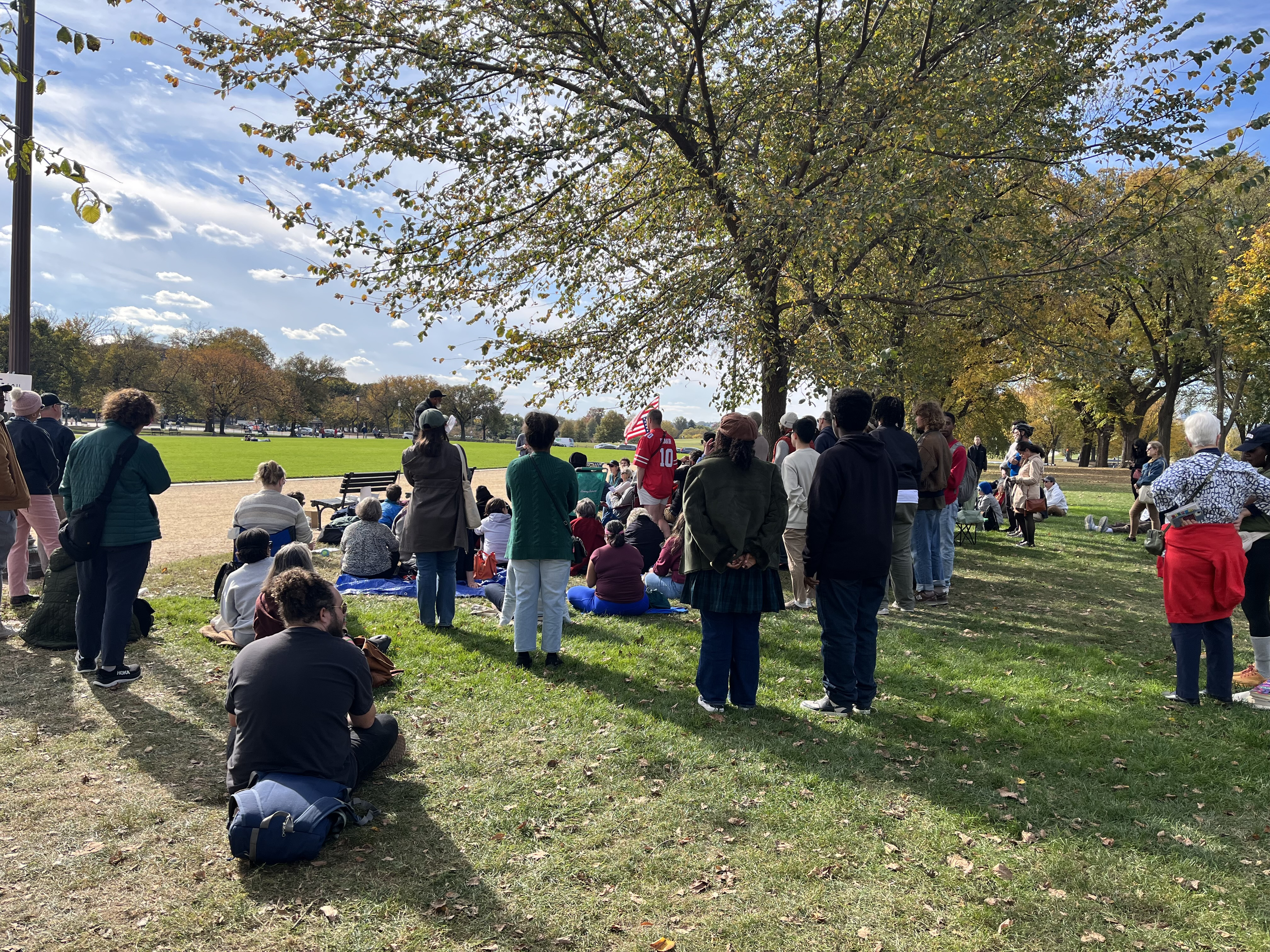
An audience listening to a talk by N. D. B. Connolly during a history teach-in on the U.S. National Mall in 2025.

In the 1990s activists began a new series of teach-ins focused on the corporatization of education and on corporate power generally. These began under the name of the 'National Teach-Ins on Corporations, Education, and Democracy' in 1996 and continued on as the 'Democracy Teach-Ins' (DTIs) of 1998, 1999, 2001, and 2002. Leading activist and intellectual figures of the 1990s, including Cornel West, Medea Benjamin, Richard Grossman, Naomi Klein, and Vandana Shiva spoke at the Democracy Teach-Ins, which were coordinated in their first years by Ben Manski. The Democracy Teach-ins were coordinated on hundreds of campuses at once, and were intended to build campus-based networks of pro-democracy activists. The 1999 Democracy Teach-Ins, in particular, played a role in mobilizing students for the 1999 Seattle WTO protests; the 2002 teach-ins played a similar role in preparing for the 2003 national Books Not Bombs student strike. After 1998, the DTIs became a project of the campus syndicalist movement 180/Movement for Democracy and Education.

Teach-ins have more recently been used by environmental educators. The ‘2010 Imperative: A Global Emergency Teach-in’ was held on February 20, 2007, at the New York Academy of Science and organized by Architecture 2030, led by architect Edward Mazria and viewable online through a webcast.

The teach-in model was also used by a ‘Focus the Nation’ event January 31, 2008, to raise awareness about climate change. A 'National Teach-in' was held in February 2009, also addressing global climate change.

In 2011, Occupy Wall Street movement began using teach-ins to educate people about the inherent problems of capitalism.

In 2015 and 2016, Black Lives Matter teach-ins were held across the United States, including in Ithaca, New York; the Pratt Institute; Framingham State University; and Greenville, South Carolina.

In 2017 and 2018, the University of Michigan ran a number of free online "Teach-Outs" on topics such as free speech, fake news, hurricanes, and science communications. Some of the Teach-Outs were hosted on Coursera.

In 2018, the University of Michigan and the University of Notre Dame partnered to offer a series of teach-ins and an online "Teach-Out" on Puerto Rico's hurricane recovery efforts.

In 2018, Stanford University held a teach-in for gun-violence in schools.

In 2018, students, faculty, and alumni at Edinburgh University held teach-ins on a range of issues while occupying the George Square lecture theatre in support of the University College Union strikes.

In 2020, students and faculty at Haverford College held teach-ins on racial justice and other related issues during a strike against the college for its refusal to meet the demands proposed by Black and other POC students.

== See also ==
- Bed-In a 1969 campaign for peace in the Vietnam War by John Lennon and Yoko Ono
- Die-in
- Sit-in
- Work-in
- Central Park be-in
- Human Be-In
- List of peace activists
- Moratorium to End the War in Vietnam
- National Mobilization Committee to End the War in Vietnam
