= Otto Schilling =

German-American mathematician (1911–1973)

Otto Franz Georg Schilling (3 November 1911 – 20 June 1973) was a German-American mathematician known as one of the leading algebraists of his time.

He was born in Apolda and studied in the 1930s at the Universität Jena and the Universität Göttingen under Emmy Noether. After Noether was forced to leave Germany by the Nazis, he found a new advisor in Helmut Hasse, and obtained his Ph.D. from Marburg University in 1934 on the thesis Über gewisse Beziehungen zwischen der Arithmetik hyperkomplexer Zahlsysteme und algebraischer Zahlkörper. He then was post doc at Trinity College, Cambridge before moving to Institute for Advanced Study 1935–37 and the Johns Hopkins University 1937–39. He became an instructor with the University of Chicago in 1939, promoted to assistant professor 1943, associate 1945 and full professor in 1958. In 1961 he moved to Purdue University. He died in Highland Park, Illinois. His students were, among others, the game theorist Anatol Rapoport and the mathematician Harley Flanders.

== Articles ==
- Schilling, Otto F. G. (1937). "Arithmetic in a Special Class of Algebras". The Annals of Mathematics. 38 (1): 116–119. doi:10.2307/1968513. ISSN 0003-486X. JSTOR 1968513.
- Schilling, Otto F. G. (1937). "Class Fields of Infinite Degree Over p-Adic Number Fields". The Annals of Mathematics. 38 (2): 469–476. doi:10.2307/1968563. ISSN 0003-486X. JSTOR 1968563.
- Schilling, O. E. G. (1937). "Arithmetic in Fields of Formal Power Series in Several Variables". The Annals of Mathematics. 38 (3): 551–576. doi:10.2307/1968600. ISSN 0003-486X. JSTOR 1968600. (typo in Schilling's name)
- Schilling, O. F. G. (1938). "The Structure of Local Class Field Theory". American Journal of Mathematics. 60 (1): 75–100. doi:10.2307/2371544. ISSN 0002-9327. JSTOR 2371544.
- Schilling, O. F. G. (1938). "A Generalization of Local Class Field Theory". American Journal of Mathematics. 60 (3): 667–704. doi:10.2307/2371605. ISSN 0002-9327. JSTOR 2371605.
- Schilling, O. F. G. (1939). "Units in p-Adic Algebras". American Journal of Mathematics. 61 (4): 883–896. doi:10.2307/2371632. ISSN 0002-9327. JSTOR 2371632.
- with Saunders Mac Lane: MacLane, Saunders; Schilling, O. F. G. (1939). "Zero-Dimensional Branches of Rank One on Algebraic Varieties". The Annals of Mathematics. 40 (3): 507–520. doi:10.2307/1968935. ISSN 0003-486X. JSTOR 1968935.
- with Saunders Mac Lane: Lane, Saunders Mac; Schilling, O. F. G. (1939). "Infinite Number Fields with Noether Ideal Theories". American Journal of Mathematics. 61 (3): 771–782. doi:10.2307/2371335. ISSN 0002-9327. JSTOR 2371335.
- with Saunders Mac Lane: MacLane, S.; Schilling, O. F. G. (1940). "Normal Algebraic Number Fields". Proceedings of the National Academy of Sciences. 26 (2): 122–126. doi:10.1073/pnas.26.2.122. ISSN 0027-8424. PMC 1078017. PMID 16588322.
- Schilling, O. F. G. (1940). "Regular normal extensions over complete fields". Trans. Amer. Math. Soc. 47 (3): 440–454. doi:10.1090/s0002-9947-1940-0001970-2. MR 0001970.
- Schilling, O. F. G. (1940). "Remarks on a Special Class of Algebras". American Journal of Mathematics. 62 (1/4): 346–352. doi:10.2307/2371458. ISSN 0002-9327. JSTOR 2371458.
- with Saunders Mac Lane: MacLane, Saunders; Schilling, O. F. G. (1942). "A formula for the direct products of crossed product algebras". Bull. Amer. Math. Soc. 48 (2): 108–114. doi:10.1090/s0002-9904-1942-07613-0. MR 0006152.
- with Irving Kaplansky: Kaplansky, Irving; Schilling, O. F. G. (1942). "Some remarks on relatively complete fields". Bulletin of the American Mathematical Society. 48 (10): 744–748. doi:10.1090/S0002-9904-1942-07772-X. ISSN 0002-9904.
- Schilling, O. F. G. (1943). "Normal Extensions of Relatively Complete Fields". American Journal of Mathematics. 65 (2): 309–334. doi:10.2307/2371818. ISSN 0002-9327. JSTOR 2371818.
- Schilling, O. F. G. (1945). "On a special class of abelian functions". Bull. Amer. Math. Soc. 51 (2): 133–136. doi:10.1090/s0002-9904-1945-08293-7. MR 0011291.
- Schilling, O. F. G. (1945). "Noncommutative valuations". Bull. Amer. Math. Soc. 51 (4): 297–304. doi:10.1090/s0002-9904-1945-08339-6. MR 0011684.
- Schilling, O. F. G. (1946). "Ideal theory on open Riemann surfaces". Bull. Amer. Math. Soc. 52 (11, Part 1): 945–963. doi:10.1090/s0002-9904-1946-08669-3. MR 0019733.
- "Necessary conditions for local class field theory" (PDF). Mathematical Journal of Okayama University. 3 (1): 5–10. 1953. ISSN 0030-1566.
- f. g. Schilling, O. (1961). "On local class field theory". Journal of the Mathematical Society of Japan. 13 (3): 234–245. doi:10.2969/jmsj/01330234. ISSN 0025-5645.

== Books ==
- Schilling, Otto (1950). Theory of Valuations. American Mathematical Society. ISBN 0821815040.
- Schilling, Otto; Piper, William Stephen (1975). Basic abstract algebra. Allyn & Bacon. ISBN 0205042732; (394 pages)
