= Eric Fawcett =

British physicist (1927–2000)

- Eric Fawcett, 1999
- Born: 23 August 1927; Blackburn, England
- Died: 2 September 2000 (aged 73); Toronto, Ontario, Canada
- Citizenship: Canada
- Education: University of Cambridge
- Known for: Nuclear Physicist, Dissident, Human Rights Activist.

Eric Fawcett (23 August 1927 – 2 September 2000), was a professor of physics at the University of Toronto for 23 years. He also co-founded Science for Peace.

== Academic and professional life ==
Fawcett began his prestigious career in physics with a full scholarship to the University of Cambridge. After graduation, he crossed the Atlantic to take up a post-doctoral fellowship at the National Research Council in Ottawa in 1954. Two years later Fawcett returned to England, where he worked at the Royal Radar Establishment in Malvern. In 1961 he moved to the United States and worked as a research physicist at Bell Laboratories in Murray Hill, New Jersey. In 1970, he accepted a Professorship in the Department of Physics at the University of Toronto, where he remained until his retirement in 1993.

Besides first observing cyclotron resonance in metals, Fawcett is credited with discovering the Hall effect in type-II superconductors. While he used many different experimental techniques over his career, including neutron scattering, magnetostriction was a technique that Fawcett especially developed as an effective probe of magnetism in metals and alloys.

== Activism ==
=== Russia ===
In the 1980s, Eric showed leadership in the international effort to assist physicists (mainly Jewish) in the Soviet Union who had been fired from their positions in leading research institutes and universities and denied access to research facilities. Notable among these was the eminent physicist, Andrei Sakharov. He and other physicists from the West helped these "refuseniks" to keep up in current research by organizing seminars in the living rooms and kitchens of cramped apartments in Moscow. KGB agents were all around and Eric later admitted he was often fearful for his own safety.

=== Canada's foreign policy ===
Eric strongly disagreed with Canada's position in NATO. He felt that NATO's militaristic foreign policy was contrary to its ostensibly peaceful objective.

Eric also publicly expressed shame over Canada's role in the massacres of East Timor.

=== Science for Peace ===
Fawcett was the co-founder of Science for Peace, a group dedicated towards the goal of universal peace. His dedication to the University of Toronto-based program demonstrated his belief that science should be used to further the cause of worldwide peace.

== Influence ==
Fawcett's work with the Hall effect in type-II superconductors is still studied today. His name is also carried on by the biannual Eric Fawcett Memorial Forum hosted by Science for Peace.

== Personal life ==
Fawcett was the second son to Harold and Florrie Fawcett, the younger brother of Roy. Eric and Roy attended Queen Elizabeths Grammar School, Blackburn. At various times the family lived in Mellor, in Longridge and on East Park Road and then finally at 2 Tarbert Crescent, Shadsworth, Blackburn. Blackburn was a textile town, and Fawcett's mother, Florrie, had worked in the Sunnyside Mill in Blackburn as a child. This experience led her to drive Eric in his studies. His hard work paid off, as he won a full scholarship to study physics at University of Cambridge. While studying at Cambridge, he met Cambridge native Patricia Egan, his wife-to-be. The two married on 9 October 1954. Together, they moved to Ottawa, where they lived for two years. In 1956 they returned to England, this time moving to Malvern, where their children Clare (1956), Andrew (1958) and Ruth (1961) were born.

In September 1961 the family relocated to New Jersey, where they lived for ten years before moving north to Toronto, Ontario, Canada in 1971, where Eric would spend the rest of his life.

A year after the birth of his first grandchild, Michael, in late 1991, Fawcett chose to retire, doing so in 1993. Fawcett's retirement was a busy one. Three more grandchildren were born, Marc and Peter in 1994, and Robert in 1997. Eric also spent much time practicing yoga and the piano. In the academic world, Fawcett's greatest contribution during his retirement was his work for Science for Peace. A co-founder, he threw himself into the pursuit of world peace through science. In September 2000 he died from liver cancer.
