= Harley Flanders =

American mathematician (1925–2013)

- Born: September 13, 1925; Chicago, Illinois, US
- Died: July 26, 2013 (aged 87); Ann Arbor, Michigan, US
- Education: University of Chicago
- Known for: Differential forms
- Scientific career
- Fields: Mathematics
- Workplaces: University of California, Berkeley
- Doctoral advisor: Otto Schilling; André Weil
- Doctoral students: Theodore Frankel

Harley M. Flanders (September 13, 1925 – July 26, 2013) was an American mathematician, known for several textbooks and contributions to his fields: algebra and algebraic number theory, linear algebra, electrical networks, scientific computing.

== Life ==
Flanders was a sophomore calculus student of Lester R. Ford at the Illinois Institute of Technology and asked for more challenging reading. Ford recommended A Course in Mathematical Analysis by Édouard Goursat, translated by Earle Hedrick, which included challenging exercises. Flanders recalled in 2001 that the final exercise required a proof of a formula for the derivatives of a composite function, generalizing the chain rule, in a form now called the Faa di Bruno formula.

Flanders received his bachelors (1946), masters (1947) and PhD (1949) at the University of Chicago on the dissertation Unification of class field theory advised by Otto Schilling and André Weil. He held the Bateman Fellowship at Caltech. He joined the faculty at University of California at Berkeley. In 1955 Flanders heard Charles Loewner speak there on continuous groups. Notes were taken and the lectures appeared in a limited form with the expectation that Loewner would produce a book on the topic. With his death in 1968 the notes drew the attention of Murray H. Protter and Flanders. They edited Loewner's talks and in 1971 The MIT Press published Charles Loewner: Theory of Continuous Groups. The book was re-issued in 2008.

Teaching posts Flanders held included the faculty at Purdue University (1960-1970), Tel Aviv University (1970–77), visiting professor at Georgia Tech (1977–78), visiting scholar at Florida Atlantic University (1978–85), University of Michigan, Ann Arbor (1985–97, 2000–), University of North Florida (1997–2000), and distinguished mathematician in residence at Jacksonville University (1997–2000).

Flanders was Editor-in-Chief, American Mathematical Monthly, 1969–1973. He also wrote calculus software MicroCalc, ver 1–7 (1975–).

In 1991 Flanders was invited to the first SIAM workshop on automatic differentiation, held in Breckenridge, Colorado. Flanders' chapter in the Proceedings is titled "Automatic differentiation of composite functions". He presented an algorithm inputting two n-vectors of (higher) derivatives of F and G at a point, which used the chain rule to construct a linear transformation producing the derivative of the composite F o G. With prompting from editor Griewank, Flanders included application of the algorithm to automatic differentiation of implicit functions. Recalling his early exposure to the formula of Faa di Bruno, Flanders wrote, "I think Faa's formula is quite inefficient for the practical computation of numerical (not symbolic) derivatives."

Harley Flanders died July 26, 2013, in Ann Arbor, Michigan.

== Differential forms ==
Flanders is known for advancing an approach to multivariate calculus that is independent of coordinates through treatment of differential forms. According to Shiing-Shen Chern, "an affine connection on a differentiable manifold gives rise to covariant differentiations of tensor fields. The classical approach makes use of the natural frames relative to local coordinates and works with components of tensor fields, thus giving the impression that this branch of differential geometry is a venture through a maze of indices. The author [Flanders] gives a mechanism which shows that this is not necessarily so."

In 1954, Flanders considered the converse of the Poincaré lemma.

In 1963, Flanders published Differential Forms with Applications to the Physical Sciences which connected applied mathematics and differential forms. A reviewer affirmed that the book forms such a bridge with differential geometry. Republished in 1989 by Dover Books, the book includes a succinct mathematical electromagnetism, where the electric and magnetic components of the field pertain to complementary 2-forms, obtained from exterior derivation of the electromagnetic four-potential.

== Awards ==
- MAA Lester R. Ford Award 1969
- NCRIPTAL/EDUCOM Distinguished Software Award 1987
- NCRIPTAL/EDUCOM Distinguished Software Award 1989
- Lifetime Senior Member, IEEE 1998

== Mathematics education ==
In 1970, Flanders published the first of several useful textbooks for topics commonly taught at college level: with Justin Jesse Price and Robert R. Korfhage a text on Calculus was distributed by Academic Press. With J. J. Price, Flanders also wrote Elementary Functions and Analytic Geometry (1973) and Introductory College Mathematics: with Linear Algebra and Finite Mathematics (1974). With both J.J. Price and R.R. Korfhage, Flanders wrote First Course in Calculus with Analytic Geometry (1974) and Second Course in Calculus (1974).

To support the recruitment of students with capacity to follow these courses, some works on precalculus mathematics were written with J.J. Price: Algebra (1975), Trigonometry (1975), Algebra and Trigonometry (1981), Precalculus Mathematics (1981), and College Algebra (1982).

Flanders continued with Single-Variable Calculus (1981) and another Calculus in 1985

In 1984, Flanders published his textbook on Pascal language: Scientific Pascal (1984) for which a second edition was published in 1996 by Birkhäuser. That year he also published Calculus: A lab course with MicroCalc (Springer-Verlag).

== Selected papers ==
- "Elementary Divisors of AB and BA". Proceedings of the American Mathematical Society. 2 (6): 871–874. 1951. doi:10.1090/S0002-9939-1951-0044493-X.
- Flanders, Harley (March 1953). "Generalization of a Theorem of Ankeny and Rogers". Annals of Mathematics. Second series. 57 (2): 392–400. doi:10.2307/1969866. JSTOR 1969866.
- Flanders, Harley (January 1960). "On Certain Functions with Positive Definite Hessian". Annals of Mathematics. Second series. 71 (1): 153–156. doi:10.2307/1969882. JSTOR 1969882.
- Flanders, Harley (1960). "The meaning of the form calculus in classical ideal theory". Transactions of the American Mathematical Society. 95 (1): 92–100. doi:10.1090/S0002-9947-1960-0113913-4.
- "On Spaces of Linear Transformations of Bounded Rank". Journal of the London Mathematical Society. Series 1. 37 (1): 10–16. 1962. doi:10.1112/jlms/s1-37.1.10.
- Flanders, Harley (1964). "Satellites of Half Exact Functors, a correction". Proceedings of the American Mathematical Society. 15 (5): 834–837. doi:10.1090/S0002-9939-1964-0173694-4.
- Flanders, Harley (1965). "Local Theory of Affine Hypersurfaces". Journal d'Analyse Mathématique. 15: 353–387. doi:10.1007/BF02787701. S2CID 120169974.
- Flanders, Harley (December 1966). "The Steiner Point of a Closed Hypersurface". Mathematika. 13 (2): 181–188. doi:10.1112/S0025579300003946.
- Flanders, Harley (September 1967). "Tensor and Exterior Powers". Journal of Algebra. 7 (1): 1–24. doi:10.1016/0021-8693(67)90064-6.
- Flanders, Harley (1969). "Relations on minimal hypersurfaces". Pacific Journal of Mathematics. 29 (1): 83–93. doi:10.2140/pjm.1969.29.83.
- Flanders, Harley (1970). "The Schwarzian as a curvature". Journal of Differential Geometry. 4 (4): 515–519. doi:10.4310/jdg/1214429647.
- Flanders, H. (May 1971). "Infinite Networks I – Resistive Networks". IEEE Transactions on Circuit Theory. 18 (3): 326–331. doi:10.1109/TCT.1971.1083286.
- with P. M. Lin: Lin, P.; Flanders, H. (September 1971). "Natural Frequencies of Cyclic Linear Networks". IEEE Transactions on Circuit Theory. 18 (5): 551–554. doi:10.1109/TCT.1971.1083330. S2CID 51656400.
- Flanders, Harley (1973). "Differentiation Under the Integral Sign". The American Mathematical Monthly. 80 (6): 615–627. doi:10.2307/2319163. JSTOR 2319163.
- Flanders, Harley (February 1974). "A new proof of R. Foster's averaging formula in networks". Linear Algebra and Its Applications. 8 (1): 35–37. doi:10.1016/0024-3795(74)90005-6.
- with Harald K. Wimmer: Flanders, Harley; Wimmer, Harald K. (February 1974). "Positive operators and a problem in control theory". Linear Algebra and Its Applications. 8 (1): 39–42. doi:10.1016/0024-3795(74)90006-8.
- Flanders, Harley (1975). "An extremal problem in the space of positive definite matrices". Linear and Multilinear Algebra. 3 (1–2): 33–39. doi:10.1080/03081087508817089.
- Flanders, Harley (October 1976). "On the Maximal Power Transfer Theorem for n-ports". International Journal of Circuit Theory and Applications. 4 (4): 319–344. doi:10.1002/cta.4490040402.
- with Harald K. Wimmer: "On the matrix equations AX − XB = C and AX − YB = C". SIAM Journal on Applied Mathematics. 32 (4). 1977. doi:10.1137/0132058.
- Flanders, Harley (December 1983). "Coroutines in Pascal". ACM SIGPLAN Notices. 18 (12): 49–56. doi:10.1145/988193.988198. S2CID 21839428.
- with Herbert Fischer: Fischer, Herbert; Flanders, Harley (28 February 1999). "A minimal code list". Theoretical Computer Science. 215 (1–2): 345–348. doi:10.1016/S0304-3975(98)00183-2.
- Flanders, Harley (1 September 2007). "Functions not satisfying implicit, polynomial ODE". Journal of Differential Equations. 240 (1): 164–171. Bibcode:2007JDE...240..164F. doi:10.1016/j.jde.2007.05.025.
