= Manfred Kochen =

Austrian research scientist (1928–1989)

Manfred "Fred" Kochen (4 July 1928 – 7 January 1989) was an Austrian research scientist and professor. He is best known for his academic work and research career with various companies, including IBM. Kochen's research emphasized mathematics, information science and behavioural sciences research, as well as early studies of concepts in the field of artificial intelligence, where he questioned the possibility of artificial general intelligence.

== Early life and education ==
Manfred Kochen was born on 4 July 1928, in Vienna, Austria. Some time before the outbreak of World War II, his family fled Europe to escape the threat of Nazi persecution, escaping via Portugal.

Prior to 1947, Manfred Kochen moved to the United States, where he attended Brooklyn Technical High School, graduating with a Mechanical Course diploma. Kochen received his Bachelor's of Science from Massachusetts Institute of Technology in Cambridge, Massachusetts in 1950, with a concentration in physics. Kochen would subsequently go on to Columbia University, where he would receive both his Master of Arts and PhD in applied mathematics in 1951 and 1955 respectively. During his doctoral studies, he served as an analyst with the John von Neumann project at the Institute for Advanced Study with Princeton University. After earning his doctorate, Kochen also served as a postdoctoral fellow at Harvard University and the University of Cambridge.

Kochen met his wife, Paula, in New York City. They were married from 1954 until his death.

== Career ==
After concluding his postdoctoral research, Kochen began working as a research scientist at IBM's Thomas J. Watson Research Center, where he worked until 1964. In 1965, he began teaching at the University of Michigan School of Medicine as a professor of information science, while he also held simultaneous posts as an adjunct professor in the Ross School of Business, as well as acting as a research mathematician in the Mental Health Research Institute (Michigan).

In 1972, Kochen was elevated to a full professorship, and would continue to teach until his death.

Kochen died on 7 January 1989. His death was reported in the Journal of the American Society for Information Science, notices of the American Mathematical Society and his legacy was analyzed by Don R. Swanson.

== Selected publications ==
=== Books ===
- Kochen, Manfred. 1963. Techniques for Document Retrieval Research : State of the Art. International Business Corporation, Thomas J. Watson Research Center.
- Kochen, Manfred, Thomas J. Watson IBM Research Center., and Air Force Cambridge Research Center . Electronics Research Directorate. 1964. Some Problems in Information Science with Emphasis on Adaptation to Use through Man-Machine Interaction. International Business Machines Corp., Thomas J. Watson Research Center.
- Kochen, Manfred. 1965. Some Problems in Information Science. Scarecrow Press.
- Kochen, Manfred. 1967. The Growth of Knowledge; Readings on Organization and Retrieval of Information. Wiley.
- Kochen, Manfred. 1974. Integrative Mechanisms in Literature Growth. Greenwood Press.
- Kochen, Manfred. 1974. Principles of Information Retrieval. Melville Pub. Co.
- Kochen, Manfred, and Joseph C Donohue. 1976. Information for the Community. American Library Association.
- Kochen, Manfred, and Karl W Deutsch. 1980. Decentralization : Sketches toward a Rational Theory. Oelgeschlager, Gunn & Hain ; Königstein/Ts. : Verlag A. Hain

=== Journal articles ===
- Kochen, Manfred, and Marion J Levy Jr. 1956. “The Logical Nature of an Action Scheme.” Behavioral Science (California) 1 (4): 265–89. https://doi.org/10.1002/bs.3830010403.
- Kochen, Manfred, and Eugene H Galanter. 1958. “The Acquisition and Utilization of Information in Problem Solving and Thinking.” Information and Control 1 (3): 267–88. https://doi.org/10.1016/S0019-9958(58)80005-4.
- Kochen, Manfred. 1964. “Adaptive Mechanism in Digital Concept Processing.” IEEE Transactions on Applications and Industry 83 (74): 305–14. https://doi.org/10.1109/TAI.1964.5407761.
- Kochen, Manfred, and Karl W Deutsch. 1969. “Toward a Rational Theory of Decentralization: Some Implications of a Mathematical Approach.” The American Political Science Review 63 (3): 734–49. https://doi.org/10.2307/1954425.
- Kochen, Manfred, and Karl W Deutsch. 1974. “A Note on Hierarchy and Coordination: An Aspect of Decentralization.” Management Science (Linthicum) 21 (1): 106–14. https://doi.org/10.1287/mnsc.21.1.106.
- Badre, Albert N, Manfred Kochen, and Barbara Badre. 1976. On Recognizing and Formulating Mathematical Problems. April.
- Manfred Kochen. 1977. Imprecision in Coping and Attending Processes. (New Orleans).
- Kochen, M. (1980). Quality sorting and social stability. Human Systems Management, 1(2), 107-108.
- Kochen, M., & Zeleny, M. (1981). Self-service aspects of health maintenance: assessment of current trends. Human Systems Management, 2(4), 259-267.
- Kochen, M. (1985). The future of AI and human flexibility*. Human Systems Management, 5(2), 159-162.
- Kochen, M., & Barr, C. (1986). Distributed Expert Systems for Planners. Knowledge, 8(1), 79-93.
- Manfred Kochen. 1986. On the Value of Human Resources.
