= Justin Jesse Price =

American mathematician

Justin Jesse Price (1930 – 12 March 2011) was an American mathematician, known for several textbooks and contributions to his field.

His Ph.D. dissertation at the University of Pennsylvania was I. Some Duality Theorems II. On the Characters of Certain Compact Abelian Groups advised by Nathan Fine (1956). Price participated in a research project for the Air Force (1956–58) and joined the faculty at Cornell University as associate professor (1958–63). In 1963 he became professor at Purdue University, retiring in 2004.

Price's research was in real analysis and orthogonal functions. In fact, his article on convergence of incomplete sets of orthogonal functions merited award from Mathematical Association of America.

He had sabbaticals and stays at Paris, University College London, University of California, Berkeley and Harvard University. Several educational textbooks were collaborations with Purdue colleague Harley Flanders (see this for booklist).

== Awards ==
- 1976: L. R. Ford award from Mathematical Association of America for excellence in expository writing and a paper on Orthogonal Functions
- 1994: Mathematical Association of America's Deborah and Franklin Haimo Award for Distinguished College or University Teaching of Mathematics
