= Peace Magazine =

Canadian magazine

- Editor: Metta Spencer
- Publisher: Canadian Disarmament Information Service, Peace Info Service
- First issue: March 1985
- Country: Canada
- Based in: Toronto, Ontario
- Language: English
- Website: www.peacemagazine.org
- ISSN: 0826-9521
- OCLC: 13448481

Peace Magazine is a Canadian magazine on disarmament and peacebuilding issues, published by Canadian Disarmament Information Service (CANDIS).

== History and profile ==
Peace Magazine was launched in 1985 as a continuation of an earlier CANDIS publication, The Peace Calendar, which appeared monthly between February 1983 and January 1985. Originally a simple listings sheet for Toronto-area peace events, The Peace Calendar had expanded into a 12-page tabloid with articles and analysis in addition to Canada-wide listings in the period immediately before the Peace Magazine launch.

The magazine published monthly from March to December 1985; bimonthly from January–February 1986 to May–June 1999; and quarterly since July–September 1999. There has been formal and informal cooperation with other Canadian and international peace organizations throughout the magazine's history; from 1993 to 2006 the magazine included a section produced in collaboration with Science for Peace.

Peace Magazine was one of the first Canadian magazines to be produced with desktop publishing software. Its website has been online since 1997, includes a full set of archives from 1983 to the end of the preceding calendar year.

The magazine has had a strong editorial emphasis on democracy, human rights, and the technical aspects of disarmament. Its writers are roughly equally distributed between activists and academics, with considerable overlap between these two spheres. The editor is retired sociologist and peace activist Metta Spencer.
