= Science for Peace =

Science for Peace is a charitable organisation dedicated to popular education and research on demilitarisation, climate change mitigation, social justice and non-violence. It was co-founded by a group of University of Toronto faculty members including Eric Fawcett and Anatol Rapaport. It is based in Toronto, Ontario. Activities undertaken include lectures, workshops, administering the Franz Blumenfeld Peace Education Fund, and hosting the biannual Eric Fawcett Memorial Forum.

== Goals ==
Science for Peace seeks "a non-militarized Canada that stands as a global beacon of ecological sustainability, non-violence, and equality."

Science for Peace was founded in response to nuclear armament. In its early days, it sought to “encourage scientific activities directed towards peace, and to urge the publication and dissemination of the findings of peace research.” As it grew, its goals broadened to include mitigating climate change and the harms of corporate globalisation.

== History ==
=== Early years ===
In the fall of 1980, physicist Eric Fawcett created "The Committee for Directing Science Toward Peace” to encourage peace research. The committee met to prepare a paper for presentation at the American Association for the Advancement of Science’s first Canadian conference held in Toronto in 1981. It continued to meet after the conference and became Science for Peace. The founding group of faculty members included Eric Fawcett, Anatol Rapoport, Derek Paul, John Polanyi, and L. Terrell Gardner.

Science for Peace launched numerous academic initiatives, including Inter-University Workshops in Peace Education at York University in 1983 and at Brock University in 1984. In University College, Science for Peace established a Chair of Peace Studies in 1985 and launched a program in Peace and Conflict Studies in 1986. Anatol Rapoport was the first Professor of Peace Studies. The program later evolved into the Peace, Conflict and Justice program at the Trudeau Centre for Peace, Conflict and Justice.

Membership expanded beyond University of Toronto faculty and grew steadily. In 1987, the organisation had 600 members mostly in the physical and social sciences, with local chapters in British Columbia, New Brunswick, Québec, Toronto, Ottawa, Guelph, Waterloo, and Brock University. Several chapters offered public education through regular public lectures and panel discussions.

== Activities ==
The organization has undertaken various teaching activities; publication of academic research and regular bulletins; organization of working groups, petitions, workshops and conferences in Canada; attendance at national and international peace conferences and events, including the Pugwash Conferences and events related to the Science for Peace International Network (SPIN). Science for Peace members have advised the Canadian government on matters relating to peace and disarmament.

== Notable members ==
Notable members include:

- George Ignatieff
- Ian Hacking
- Hanna Newcombe
- Ursula Franklin
- David Suzuki
- John Tuzo Wilson

== See also ==
- Peace and conflict studies
- Peace Magazine
