= Arnold Kaufman =

American political philosopher

Arnold Saul Kaufman (14 September 1927 – 6 June 1971) was an American political philosopher.

== Early and personal life ==
Kaufman was born on 14 September 1927 in Hartford, Connecticut to Louis Kaufman and Norma Grant Kaufman Gofberg. His parents were Jewish immigrants from Lithuania and Belarus. His family moved to Queens, New York when he was young. Kaufman described himself as a "New York immigrant Jew". He served in the Navy for two years during World War II.

Kaufman graduated from City College of New York in 1949. He received his PhD from Columbia University in 1955, with a dissertation on Leonard Hobhouse written under Charles Frankel. He was a Fulbright scholar, studying at the London School of Economics and at Oxford University.

Kaufman had a wife, Betty, and two children, Margaret and William. His brother, Jerome, was an urban planner.

== Career ==
Kaufman spent fourteen years at University of Michigan, from 1955 onwards. At Michigan, he was involved in organising the first ever teach-in in 1965, held to protest the Vietnam War. He was active within the Democratic Party (in particular, Eugene McCarthy's presidential campaign), the National Mobilization Committee to End the War in Vietnam, Students for a Democratic Society, and SANE. He was also active in the NAACP and was once vice president of his local chapter at Ann Arbor.

For a time in the early 1960s he was in England, working freelance as a journalist and contributor to Socialist Commentary.

Kaufman's best known work is his 1968 book The Radical Liberal: New Man in American Politics, attempting to synthesise traditional liberalism and nonviolent radical tendencies in the New Left. He wrote in 1958 of liberalism

Liberalism is no insipid political brew. It is potentially the most radical doctrine in the modern world. Because, rightly interpreted, it cannot respect any arrangements—however firmly en-trenched—which deny to every human being his full allotment of personal freedom. [...] A liberal hates that in man which seeks to accumulate power, prestige, and privileges at the expense of the rightful power, prestige, and privileges of others.

The book's title may have been the source of the pejorative use of "radical liberal" by Vice President Spiro Agnew. Kaufman also coined the term "participatory democracy" in 1960. He lectured to the SDS about participatory democracy at Port Huron in 1962, thus influencing the group's Port Huron Statement.

Kaufman taught at UCLA from 1969 to his death. He protested vigorously against the firing of Angela Davis.

== Death ==
Kaufman died on 6 June 1971 on board Hughes Airwest Flight 706 when it crashed into a military jet. He was on his way to a conference in Salt Lake City.

== Works ==
- The Radical Liberal: New Man in American Politics (New York: Atherton Press) 1968.
- On Freedom of the Will (an abridged version of Jonathan Edwards). Ed. Arnold S. Kaufman and William Franken (New York: The Bobbs-Merrill Company, Inc.) 1969.
