= Richard Brautigan bibliography =

Richard Brautigan (1935–1984) was an American novelist, poet, and short story writer. His works use magical realism, satire, postmodernism, whimsy, and surrealism to touch on themes of isolation, nature, and absurdity in modern life. His novel Trout Fishing in America (1967) first attracted international recognition and became closely associated with the countercultural movement of the 1960s. While his popularity waned in the United States during the 1970s and 1980s, he continued to be influential in Europe and Japan. Brautigan published ten novels, including notable works like In Watermelon Sugar (1967) and The Abortion: An Historical Romance 1966 (1971), as well as ten poetry collections and two collections of short stories. A collection of various early writings given to a friend's mother was published posthumously, while another early short story remains unpublished. Since 1967, at least 500 translations of his work have been published in 41 languages.

== Poetry collections ==
- The Return of the Rivers. San Francisco: Inferno Press. 1957.
- The Galilee Hitch-Hiker. San Francisco: White Rabbit Press. 1958.
- Lay the Marble Tea. San Francisco: Carp Press. 1959.
- The Octopus Frontier. San Francisco: Carp Press. 1960.
- All Watched Over by Machines of Loving Grace. San Francisco: The Communication Company. 1967.
- Please Plant This Book. Santa Barbara: Graham Mackintosh. 1968.
- The Pill Versus the Springhill Mine Disaster. San Francisco: Four Seasons Foundation. 1969.
- Rommel Drives on Deep into Egypt. New York: Delacorte Press. 1970. ISBN 0-385-28863-8.
- Loading Mercury with a Pitchfork. New York: Simon & Schuster. 1976. ISBN 0-671-22263-5.
- June 30th, June 30th. New York: Delacorte Press. 1978. ISBN 0-385-28495-0.

== Novels ==
Brautigan published nine novels, a tenth was published after his death, and an eleventh remains unpublished.

- A Confederate General from Big Sur. New York: Grove Press. 1965. ISBN 0-224-61923-3.
- Trout Fishing in America. San Francisco: Four Seasons Foundation. 1967. ISBN 0-395-50076-1.
- In Watermelon Sugar. San Francisco: Four Seasons Foundation. 1968. ISBN 1-131-52372-5.
- The Abortion: An Historical Romance 1966. New York: Simon & Schuster. 1971. ISBN 0-671-20872-1.
- The Hawkline Monster: A Gothic Western. New York: Simon & Schuster. 1974. ISBN 0-671-21809-3.
- Willard and His Bowling Trophies: A Perverse Mystery. New York: Simon & Schuster. 1975. ISBN 0-671-22065-9.
- Sombrero Fallout: A Japanese Novel. New York: Simon & Schuster. 1976. ISBN 0-671-22331-3.
- Dreaming of Babylon: A Private Eye Novel 1942. New York: Delacorte Press. 1977. ISBN 0-440-02146-4.
- So the Wind Won't Blow It All Away. New York: Delacorte Press. 1982. ISBN 0-440-08195-5.
- An Unfortunate Woman: A Journey. New York: St. Martins Press. 2000. ISBN 0-312-26243-4.
  - Written in 1982 and first published, posthumously, in France in 1994, as Cahier d'un Retour de Troie, published by Christian Bourgois.

== Short story collections ==
- Revenge of the Lawn. New York: Simon & Schuster. 1971. ISBN 0-671-20960-4.
  - Collection of short stories.
- The Tokyo-Montana Express. New York: Delacorte Press. 1980. ISBN 0-440-08770-8.
  - Collection of linked short-short stories.

== Other works ==
- The God of the Martians. Unpublished. 1955–1956.
- The Edna Webster Collection of Undiscovered Writings
  - Materials Brautigan gave to Edna Webster, including stories and poems; published in 1999.
- In addition to his own published books, Brautigan's writings have appeared in at least 250 other publications. In many cases such a work contained the first appearance of one or more poems or stories.

== Other media ==
- Listening to Richard Brautigan
  - Album recorded at Golden State Recorders in San Francisco, intended for the Beatles Zapple Records (1969) but the label was closed down by Allen Klein.
