= All Watched Over by Machines of Loving Grace =

Poem by Richard Brautigan

"All Watched Over by Machines of Loving Grace" is a poem by Richard Brautigan first published in his 1967 collection of the same name, his fifth book of poetry. In it, the narrator presents an enthusiastic description of a technological utopia in which machines improve and protect the lives of humans. The poem has counterculture and hippie themes, influenced by Cold War-era technology. It has been interpreted both as utopian and as an ironic critique of the utopia it describes. It is Brautigan's most frequently reprinted poem.

== Synopsis and analysis ==
Brautigan wrote the poem and eponymous collection between January 17–26, 1967, while a poet-in-residence at the California Institute of Technology in Pasadena, California. The poem is 99 words in 3 stanzas, and describes a technological utopia in which humans and technology work together for the greater good. Brautigan writes about "mammals and computers liv[ing] together in mutually programming harmony", with technology acting as caretakers while "we are free of our labors and joined back to nature." Reviewers disagree whether it should be taken earnestly or ironically.

The poem is typically understood as a mix of hippie counterculture, with its desire for leisure and a return to nature, with Cold War-era technological visions. Brautigan's publisher, Claude Hayward, said it "caught me with its magical references to benign machines keeping order ... [which] fit right in with our optimism over the promise of the computer". Digital humanities professor Steven E. Jones described the theme of the poem as "what is now called cyborg identity", and situated it in 1960s California counterculture, with its juxtaposition of hippie values with technology, burgeoning hacker culture, and psychedelics. The idea of a technologically enabled utopia was popular in 1960s California, with one strain, exemplified by "All Watched Over by Machines of Loving Grace", described by historian Charles Perry as a post-scarcity "robots will do all the work" leisure society. Historian of counterculture Theodore Roszak wrote that it "captures perfectly the much-prized synthesis of reversionary and technophiliac values", while futurist James Lovelock viewed it in an environmentalist light, as "an early, and in some ways accurate" example of the subject of his book, Novacene: "an age in which humans and cyborgs would live together in peace—perhaps in loving grace—because they share a common project to ensure their survival. That project is maintaining the Earth as a liveable planet". Jones also wrote that Brautigan's use of religious language, in a way that was common among hippies, was "at once ironic and deliberately naive" while also placing the poem in "the American literary-religious tradition".

Poet Vijay Nambisan selected the poem to feature in The Hindu, writing in 2000 that "you cannot write a poem like this today. It is too childlike, too innocent. Indeed, college friends who were moved by Brautigan's work twenty years ago would now laugh at me for choosing it. That's more or less what happened to Brautigan." Literary critic Steven Moore wrote that the collection All Watched Over by Machines of Loving Grace marked "the transition of Brautigan from 'the last of the Beats' ... to the first of the hippie writers", and that the poem "[captured] the giddy sense of new possibilities that was in the air back then".

Others have interpreted it as an ironic, mocking critique of Cold War-era technology, or of the kind of technologically enabled utopia it purports to long for. According to Stanford's Carlos Seligo, there is an irony in the poem that "is as subtle and complex as his mixed metaphors", which Seligo says are "always doing at least three—and often four, five, or six things at once." Carnegie Mellon University English professor Robert J. Gangewere noted how unusual it is for American poets to take a positive view of the relationship between humans and technology at all, and that if the poem is viewed as ironic it "joins the mainstream of antitechnological American verse."

== Publication history ==
"All Watched Over by Machines of Loving Grace" was first published by the Communication Company, the publishing arm of the Diggers—a street theater and activist group in the Haight-Ashbury area of San Francisco—on an 8.5-by-11-inch (216 by 279 mm) mimeographed broadside with both the title and imprint handwritten. According to Jones, the poem may have also been a celebration of "its own technical mode of production", whereby the mimeograph allowed the counterculture to spread messages to more people. The first run included a picture of a megaphone, and a second printing had an image of people working on a large computer, rotated to run vertically beside the poem, with simple line drawings of animals all over the page. In April of the same year, the Communication Company published it again as the title poem in the collection by the same name. It included 36 type-written yellow pages measuring 8.75-by-7-inch (222 by 178 mm), in a print run of 1,500, all of which were given away for free. Brautigan included a copyleft statement which retains copyright but grants permission to reprint any of the poems so long as they are likewise given away for free.

The poem and its eponymous collection were popular, in part due to the success of Brautigan's 1967 novella Trout Fishing in America. It was included with the rest of the contents of the 1967 collection, along with other previously published collections and new material, in the book-length The Pill versus the Springhill Mine Disaster (1968).

Brautigan then gave permission to the Diggers to include the poem in their August 1968 pamphlet, The Digger Papers. That 24-page pamphlet was in turn republished in The Realist issue 81, and another 40,000 copies were printed by the Diggers and given away for free. The same year, it also appeared in TriQuarterly, the Ann Arbor Sun, and San Francisco Express Times. "All Watched Over by Machines of Loving Grace" has gone on to become Brautigan's most frequently reprinted poem.

Brautigan read the poem, along with several others from The Pill versus the Springhill Mine Disaster, on his 1970 album, Listening to Richard Brautigan. The 33 1/3 phonograph record was issued by Harvest Records based on a recording Brautigan recorded at Golden State Recorders in San Francisco. It was reissued in 2005 on compact disc.

== Legacy ==
In the 1970s, the poem became associated with the appropriate technology movement and the name Loving Grace Cybernetics was adopted by the hippie-hacker group operating Community Memory, the first bulletin board system based in a record store in Berkeley.

The Adam Curtis-directed documentary series All Watched Over by Machines of Loving Grace was named after the poem. Its second part includes a recording of Brautigan doing a reading. According to the Chicago Reader, "For all the frenzy of the images, what dominates the sequence are Brautigan's voice and the languid piece of symphonic music on the soundtrack."

The James Cohan Gallery in New York held an art show named after the poem in 2015. In her review, the New York Times' Martha Schwendener highlighted the juxtaposition of traditional art forms like Brautigan's poetry or the show's paintings with technology. At the Palais de Tokyo, the poem inspired a show of the same name in 2017, curated by Yoann Gourmel fifty years after its initial publication. The show starts with a poster for the poem, and included works which Art in America's Federico Florian said superficially fulfill Brautigan's dreams, "[evoking] a present tense where technology has imbued every aspect of human life, and therefore reshaped the mechanisms of our affections." According to Gourmel, the poem is "a paradox" which simultaneously longs for harmony but acknowledges surveillance, considering "how the use of technology reframes the way we think about representations of the body -- what is subject and what is object?"

In 2024, American artificial intelligence (AI) researcher and entrepreneur Dario Amodei published "Machines of Loving Grace," an essay imagining future scenarios where AI optimistically transform society. Amodei, who cofounded Anthropic, describes how AI systems with superhuman capabilities could radically improve physical and mental health, economic development, international relations, and the meaning of work for humanity.
