= The Octopus Frontier =

Poetry collection by Richard Brautigan

- Cover of 1960 edition
- Author: Richard Brautigan
- Language: English
- Genre: Poetry
- Publisher: Carp Press
- Publication date: 1960
- Pages: 20
- Preceded by: Lay the Marble Tea
- Followed by: All Watched Over by Machines of Loving Grace

The Octopus Frontier is a 1960 poetry collection by American writer Richard Brautigan. It is Brautigan's fourth poetry publication and his second collection of poetry, and it includes 22 poems.

== Contents ==
The Octopus Frontier includes 22 poems:

- "The Sawmill"
- "1942"
- "The Wheel"
- "The Pumpkin Tide"
- "The Sidney Greenstreet Blues"
- "The Quail"
- "The Symbol"
- "A Postcard from Chinatown"
- "Sit Comma and Creely Comma"
- "The Rape of Ophelia"
- "The Last Music Is Not Heard"
- "The Octopus Frontier"
- "The Potato House of Julius Caesar"
- "The Fever Monument"
- "The Winos on Potrero Hill"
- "Mike"
- "Horse Race"
- "The Old Folk's Home"
- "The Postman"
- "Surprise"
- "The Nature Poem"
- "Private Eye Lettuce"

All but 5 of the poems were republished in the 1968 collection, The Pill versus the Springhill Mine Disaster.

== Reception ==
In the Dictionary of Literary Biography, Caroline Bokinsky said the collection "continues Brautigan's creation of order and meaning from objects in the literal world by using them to construct a fantasy world within his own imagination." Citing several examples, she describes the ways in which Brautigan makes connections and associations to lead readers through his imagination, acting "as a painter, in a meticulous step-by-step process, putting each object in a specific place to create a painting."

Fellow poet Richard McClure said the poems "are filled with large simple images of vegetables and pumpkins floating on the tide, a poem about Ophelia, and poems about childhood." According to McClure, it was at this point in Brautigan's writing that there emerged "a recognizable Brautigan style [...] but there is no indication that this work is greatly above the level of much North Beach poetry."

== Cover ==
The Octopus Frontier is the first Brautigan work to feature a photograph on the cover. The image, by San Francisco-based photographer Gui de Angelo, shows a person's feet standing on a six-foot octopus tentacle Brautigan bought for the purpose from a Chinatown fishmonger and carried to the roof of a building in North Beach. It has been described as being "striking and just misses being sinister".
