= Dreaming of Babylon =

1977 novel by Richard Brautigan

Dreaming of Babylon: A Private Eye Novel 1942
- First edition cover
- Author: Richard Brautigan
- Cover artist: Craig Nelson
- Language: English
- Publisher: Delacorte Press/ Seymour Lawrence
- Publication date: 1977
- Publication place: United States
- Media type: Print (Hardback & Paperback)
- Pages: 220
- ISBN: 0-440-02146-4 (hardback edition)
- OCLC: 2964445
- Dewey Decimal: 813/.5/4
- LC Class: PZ4.B826 Dr PS3503.R2736
- Preceded by: Sombrero Fallout: A Japanese Novel
- Followed by: So the Wind Won't Blow It All Away

Dreaming of Babylon: A Private Eye Novel 1942 is Richard Brautigan's eighth novel and was published in 1977. It is a black comedy set in San Francisco in 1942. The central character, C. Card, is no Sam Spade, but actually does do detective work of a sort, when he's not off dreaming of Babylon.
