= Kenn Davis =

American novelist

- Born: Kenneth Allan Schmoker; February 20, 1932; Salinas, California, U.S.
- Died: January 12, 2010 (aged 77); Roseville, California, U.S.
- Education: City College of San Francisco; San Francisco Art Institute
- Known for: Painting, mystery fiction, horror film
- Movement: Beat Generation, surrealism, mystery

Kenn Davis (1932–2010) was an American surrealist painter and mystery novel writer. During the 1950s and 1960s he was associated with the Beat Generation at San Francisco's North Beach.

== Life and education ==
Kenn Davis was born as Kenneth Allan Schmoker in Salinas, California. After his parents divorced, he moved at age 5 with his mother and younger brother (born Marvin Schmoker) to San Francisco. He attended grammar school in San Francisco. He went to finger painting and drawing classes on Saturdays at the San Francisco Museum of Art, today's San Francisco Museum of Modern Art. At the beginning of WWII, age 10, Kenn and his brother attended a Catholic boy's boarding school in Marin County across the Golden Gate Bridge from San Francisco. At the end of the war, Kenn and his brother Marvin moved back to their mother and step father, Henry Davis, who bought Kenn his first easel. Kenn changed his surname to his step father's name. (His brother changed his name to Zekial Marko and became a mystery author under the name of John Trinian.) Kenn attended City College of San Francisco before being drafted into the Korean War in 1952. He left the military in 1954 and returned to study art at the City College of San Francisco. In 1956 he transferred to the San Francisco Art Institute. In 1964, he was hired by the San Francisco Chronicle as photo retoucher and illustrator, a position from which he resigned in 1984.

== Friendship with Richard Brautigan ==
Davis and Marko were close friends of author Richard Brautigan, whom Kenn met in 1956 or 1957. Kenn designed the covers for two of Brautigan's poetry collections, The Galilee Hitch-Hiker (1958) and Lay the Marble Tea (1959). He also frequently sketched him together with others of the North Beach Beat scene. In 1959, Kenn Davis painted a portrait of Richard Brautigan in oil on linen, which also appeared on the cover on a collection of essays on Brautigan edited by John Barber. This book also contains many sketches by Kenn Davis.

== Works ==
=== Paintings ===
Davis was mostly a surrealist. Some of his paintings reflect a critical analysis of society while others show an introspection of human psychology. Some paintings still draw on material reality and thus could be classified under magic realism. The style of his surrealistic paintings show the influence of European surrealists like Hieronymus Bosch. His earlier paintings of the 1950s and 1960s are darker both in color schemes and mood than his later paintings. The technique of his oil paintings at the end of the 1950s and early 1960s show the influence of old masters. His later paintings often include a humorous or satirical detail. Kenn Davis first solo exhibition was at the Studio 44 Gallery in San Francisco in 1956. Davis' paintings were displayed at the Coffee Gallery in San Francisco.

Davis designed the book covers of Robert Bloch's Lost in Time and Space with Lefty Feep, edited by John Stanley, 1987, Creatures at Large Press, as well as Creature Features Strikes Again Movie Guide and Revenge of the Creature Features Movie Guide, both by John Stanley.

==== Selection of Paintings ====
- 1954 - Point of View, oil on linen, 24" x 28", private collection
- 1957 - Impression of Actor Ben Gazzara, ink on canvas, private collection
- 1959 - Richard Brautigan as a Young Poet, oil on linen, 32" x 20", private collection
- 1960 - Family Dynamics, oil on linen, 22.5" x 28"
- 1961 - A Man Possessed, oil on linen, 52" x 34", private collection
- 1965 - Procedure for Inaugural Hopes, oil on linen, 28" x 22", private collection Germany
- 1980 - The Retention Of Mnemonic Skies, oil on linen, 34" x 44", private collection
- 1985 - Re-entry of Icarus, oil on linen, 49" x 49", private collection
- 1986 - New York, New York, oil on linen, 72" x 60", Hotel Wales, New York City
- 1990 - A Communique from Bomber Command, oil on linen, shaped canvas, 54" horizontally, private collection
- 1990 - No Energy, oil on linen, 10" x 14", private collection
- 1990 - The Nodal Point of Achievement, oil on linen, 28" x 42"
- 1993 - Spectre of Cancelled Gnostics, oil on linen, 36" x 45"
- 1995 - The Macro of Disobedience, oil on linen, 54" x 36", private collection
- 1999 - Landing in a Degraded World, oil on linen, 38" x 34"
- 2003 - The Loneliness of Noble Nutrients, oil on linen, 35" x 48"
- 2004 - A Progression of Morandi's Premise, oil on linen, 30" x 48", private collection
- 2004 - A Dwelling out of the Classifieds, oil on linen, 12" x 9", private collection
- 2008 - Rendition for an Acceptable Response, oil on linen, 28" x 42"
- 2009 - In the Age of Microwaves, oil on linen, 18.5" x 15.375"
- 2009 - Polarization of Limited Space II, oil on linen, 32" x 36", private collection
- 2009 - The Terminus of Farce, oil on linen, 37" x 43", irregular hexagonal-shaped canvas, private collection
- 2009 - Ambition Thwarted by Indifference, oil on linen, 36" x 28"
- 2009 - The Needle in Monet's Haystack, oil on linen, 22" x 32"
- 2009 - A Climax of Containers, oil on linen, 30" x 24"
- 2010 - Untitled, unfinished, final painting, oil on linen, 46" x 36", private collection

=== Books ===
Kenn Davis (together with John Stanley) is the creator of Carver Bascombe, a black Vietnam veteran with a military police background who is a private investigator in San Francisco. This character first appeared in 1976 in the mystery novel The Dark Side that Kenn coauthored with John Stanley. Carver Bascombe appears in seven more mystery novels. Kenn Davis was an Edgar Award Nominee twice, once in 1977 for The Dark Side (with John Stanley) and again in 1985 for Words Can Kill.

- Outside, (vi) Isaac Asimov's Science Fiction Magazine. Feb 1979

==== List of Books ====
- 1976 - The Dark Side (with John Stanley), Avon 30957
- 1979 - The Forza Trap, Avon 44552
- 1980 - Bogart '48 (with John Stanley), Dell 10853
- 1981 - Dead to Rights, Avon 78295
- 1984 - Words Can Kill, Gold Medal 12667
- 1986 - Melting Point, Gold Medal 12901
- 1987 - Nijinsky Is Dead, Gold Medal 13096
- 1987 - As October Dies, Gold Medal 13097
- 1989 - Acts of Homicide, Gold Medal 13351
- 1990 - Blood of Poets, Gold Medal 13352

=== Film ===
- 1978 - Nightmare in Blood (co-written and co-produced with John Stanley)
