= Mad River (band) =

American rock band

Mad River was an American psychedelic rock band, who were briefly popular in the late 1960s. They released two albums on Capitol Records, and performed with artists including The Grateful Dead, Santana, Jefferson Airplane, Quicksilver Messenger Service, Steppenwolf, Steve Miller Band, and The Allman Joys, among others. Mad River also performed at the 1968 San Francisco International Pop Festival.

Mad River formed at Antioch College in Yellow Springs, Ohio in April 1966. The band took its name from the nearby Mad River, initially billing themselves as the Mad River Blues Band. The group's lead songwriter was Lawrence Hammond, but all of the members sang vocals. In March 1967 they relocated to Berkeley, California. There they came to the attention of cult author Richard Brautigan who launched the band into the growing hippie culture. They released an EP on the independent Wee label before signing a contract with Capitol Records in February 1968. The band used Capitol's advance money to purchase all new musical equipment, and to help fund the printing of Brautigan's final self-published collection of poems, Please Plant This Book. They released two albums before disbanding in July 1969.

Lawrence Hammond put out several solo albums in the 1970s and 1980s, and Greg "Duke" Dewey later joined Country Joe and the Fish, and performed with them at Woodstock. Dewey also played with two of Marty Balin's post-Jefferson Airplane groups. In 2011, five unreleased tracks, including the original 1967 Mad River demo tapes recorded in Dayton, Ohio, were released on a vinyl EP entitled Jersey Sloo.

== Members ==
- David Robinson - guitar
- Rick Bockner- guitar, vocals
- Lawrence Hammond - bass, lead vocals
- Tom Manning - bass, vocals (April - September 1966 / 6 & 12 string guitar - March 1967 - December 1968)
- Greg "Duke" Dewey - drums, vocals
- Greg Druian - guitar (April 1966 - March 1967)

== Discography ==
- Mad River (Wee Records, 10021, 1967)
- Mad River (Capitol Records, ST-2985, 1968)

(Also reissued by both Edsel and Sundazed Records.)

- High All the Time / A. Gazelle (Capitol Records, 2310, 1968)
- Paradise Bar and Grill (Capitol Records, ST-185, 1969) U.S. No. 192

(Also reissued by both Edsel and Sundazed Records.)

- Copper Plates / Harfy Magnum (Capitol Records, 2559, 1969)
- Jersey Sloo (Shagrat Records, MAD 1-95587E, 2011)
