= Little Redfish Lake =

Lake in the state of Idaho

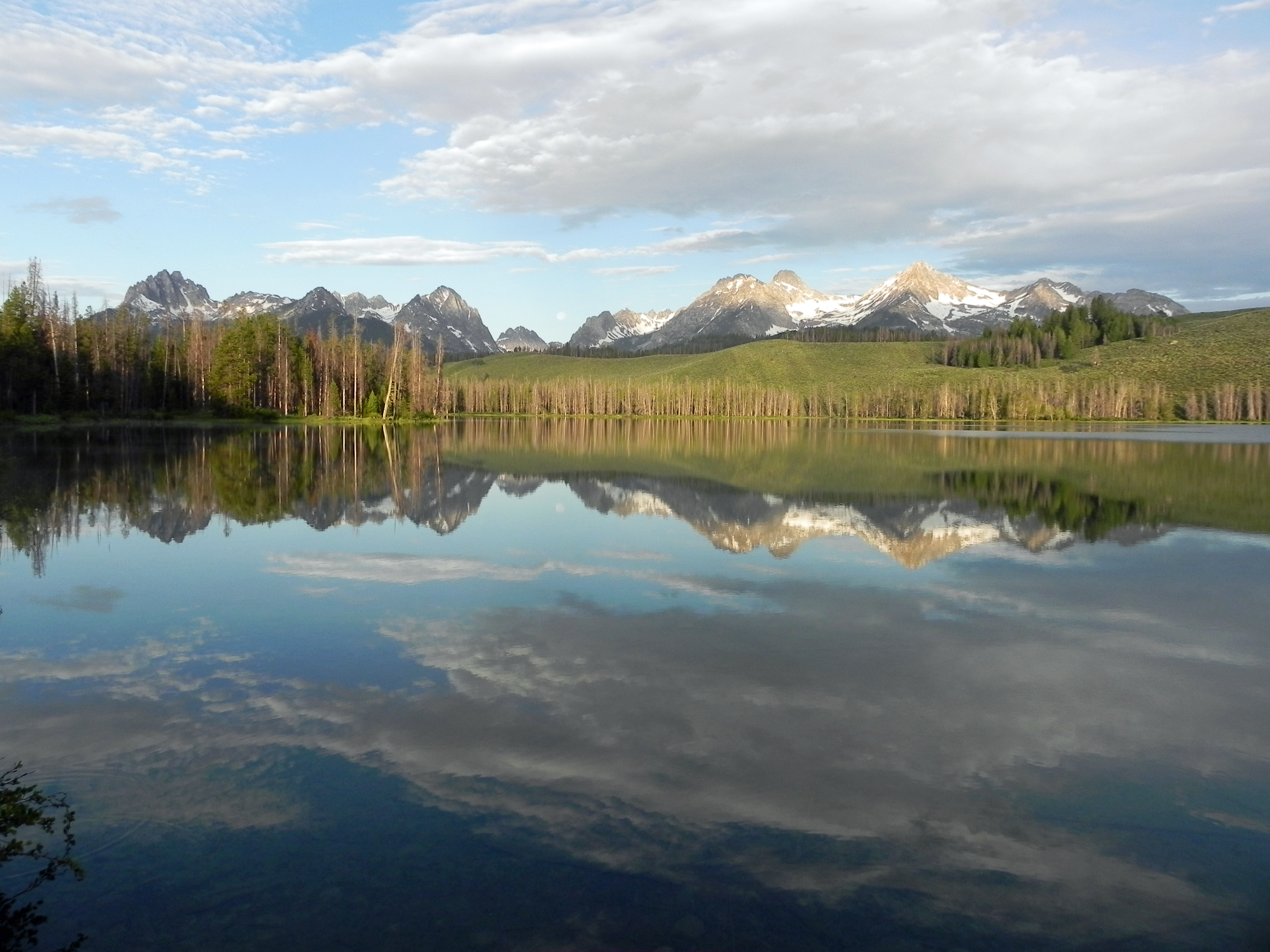
- Little Redfish Lake

- Location within Idaho Location within the United States
- Location: Custer County, Idaho
- Coordinates: 44°9′31″N 114°54′30″W
- Primary inflows: Redfish Lake Creek
- Primary outflows: Redfish Lake Creek to Salmon River
- Basin countries: United States
- Max. length: 0.34 miles (0.55 km)
- Max. width: 0.46 miles (0.74 km)
- Surface elevation: 6,489 feet (1,978 m)

Little Redfish Lake is a mountain lake along Redfish Lake Creek in Custer County, Idaho, about 1 mile (1.6 km) downstream from the larger Redfish Lake. It is located on the northeast edge of the Sawtooth Range within the Sawtooth National Recreation Area, 5 miles (8.0 km) south of Stanley along State Highway 75. The lake drains to the Salmon River.

Little Redfish Lake has a surface elevation of 6,489 feet (1,978 m) above sea level, while the main Redfish Lake sits at 6,547 feet (1,996 m). Both lakes are named for the red-scaled sockeye salmon that returned every year to spawn via the Salmon River prior to the construction of dams on the lower Snake River.

Besides the red-scaled salmon that come to this lake, Little Redfish Lake also has a clay pit, located at the bottom of the lake.

In 1961, Richard Brautigan wrote portions of his novella Trout Fishing in America while camping near the lake, which is featured in several chapters of the book.

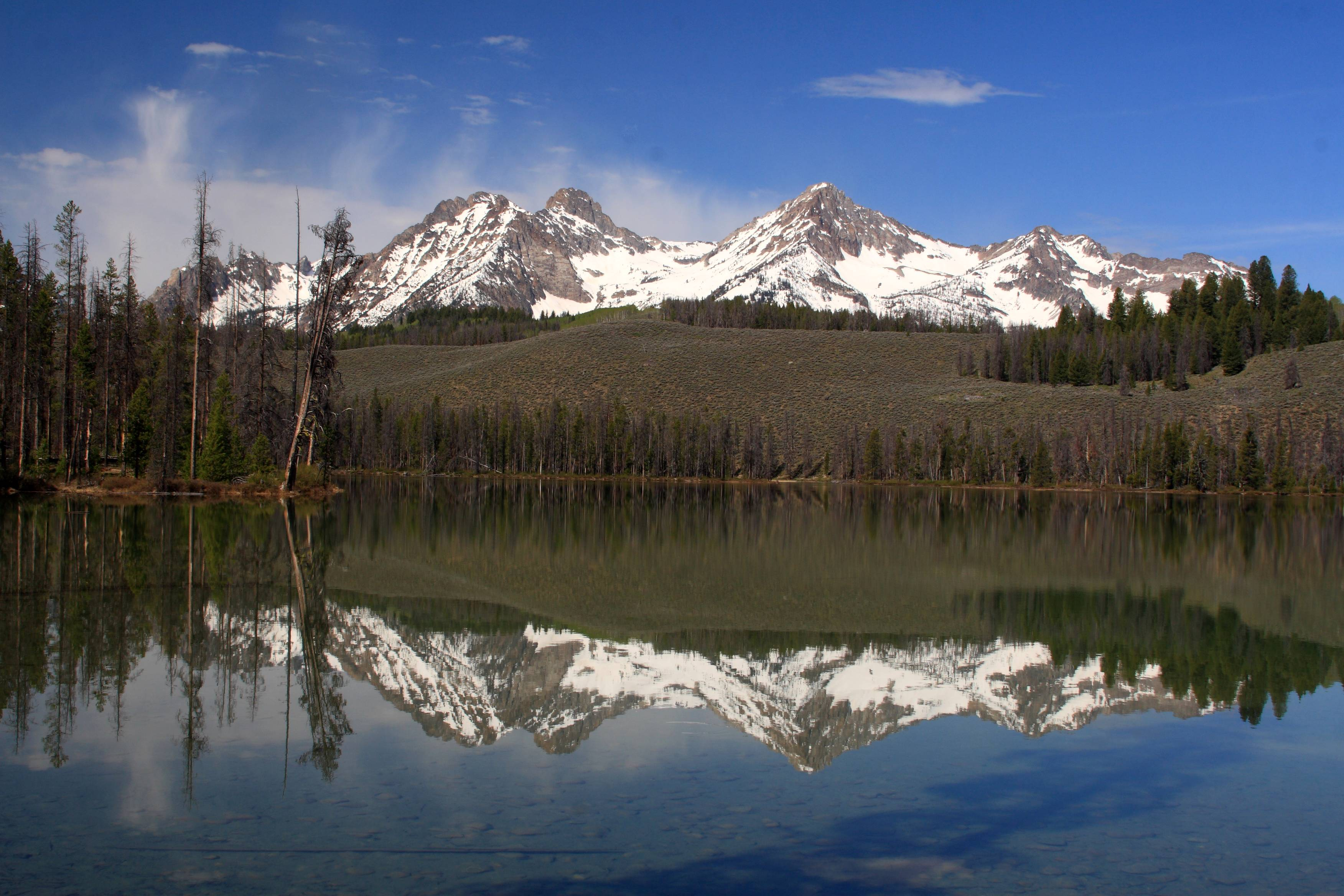
Little Redfish Lake

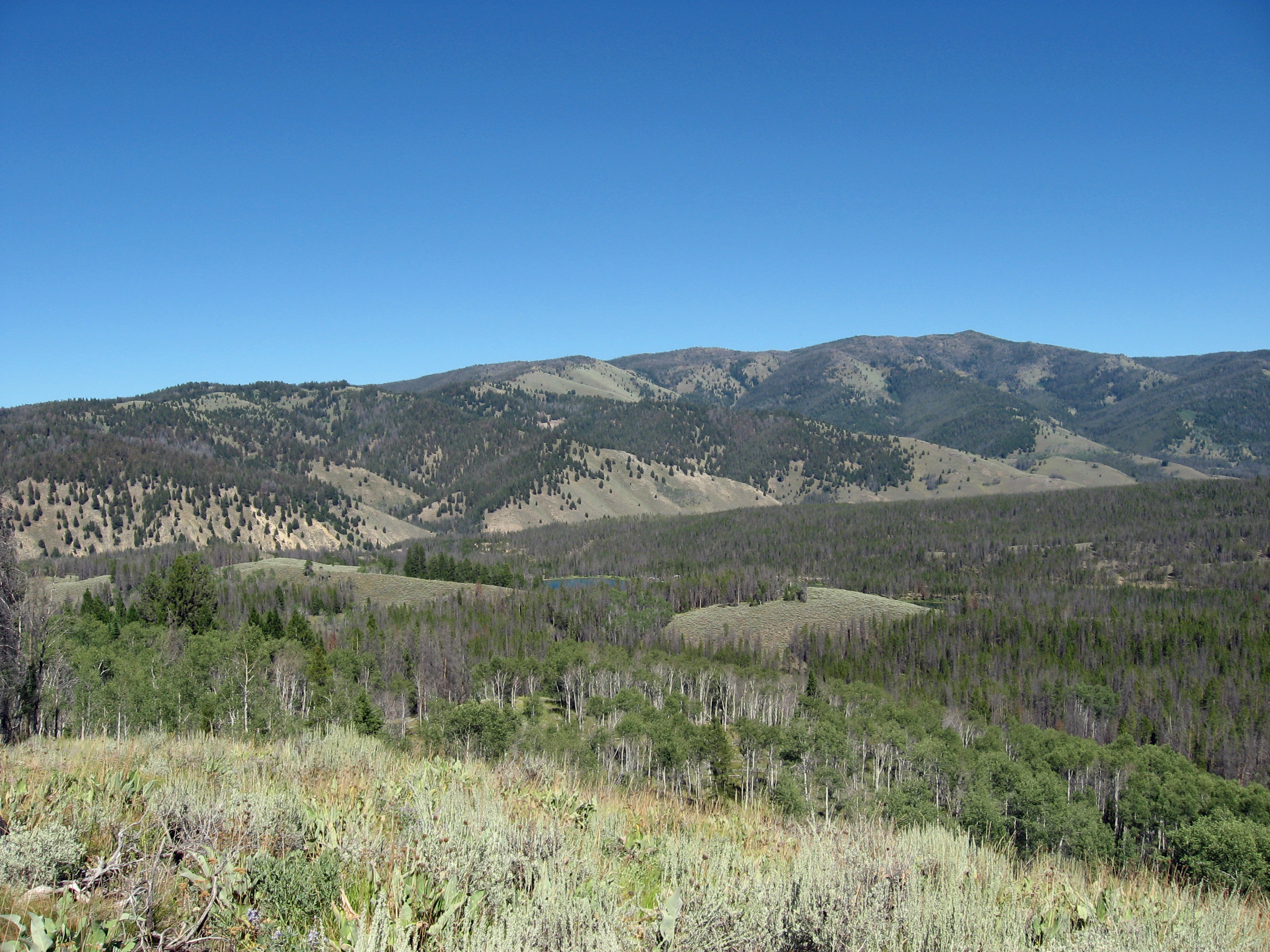
Little Redfish Lake barely visible from the Alpine Way Trail

== See also ==
- List of lakes in Idaho
