= The Tokyo-Montana Express =

1980 short story collection by Richard Brautigan

The Tokyo–Montana Express
- First edition
- Author: Richard Brautigan
- Language: English
- Publisher: Delacorte Press/Seymour Lawrence
- Publication date: 1980
- Publication place: United States
- Media type: Print (hardback)
- Pages: 258
- ISBN: 0-440-08770-8
- OCLC: 6421595
- Dewey Decimal: 813/.54
- LC Class: PS3503.R2736 T64 1980
- Preceded by: Revenge of the Lawn

The Tokyo–Montana Express is a collection by Richard Brautigan. It contains 131 chapters which are short stories written by Brautigan from 1976 to 1978, during a period when he was dividing his time between Japan and his ranch house in Montana. A note at the beginning of the book explains that the chapters are "stations" along the tracks of the Tokyo-Montana Express and the "I" is the voice of each of those stations.

A signed edition (limited to 350 copies) with this same name, but containing just 20 stories, was published by Targ Editions in 1979 prior to the first trade edition published in 1980.
