= Rommel Drives on Deep into Egypt =

Book by Richard Brautigan

- First edition
- Author: Richard Brautigan
- Cover artist: Edmund Shea
- Language: English
- Genre: Poetry
- Publisher: Delacorte Press
- Publication date: 1970
- Publication place: United States
- Media type: Print (Hardcover and Softcover)
- Pages: 85
- ISBN: 0-385-28863-8
- Preceded by: The Pill Versus the Springhill Mine Disaster
- Followed by: Loading Mercury with a Pitchfork

Rommel Drives on Deep into Egypt is Richard Brautigan's eighth poetry publication and includes 58 poems. The title of the book echoes a 1942 San Francisco Chronicle headline describing a successful operation by Rommel during the North African Campaign of World War II. The six line title poem, reminiscent of Ozymandias, uses this headline to examine the transitory nature of both human endeavor and the reader of the poem. The photograph on the cover of the first edition is of model Beverly Allen and was taken by Edmund Shea in Golden Gate Park, San Francisco.

Rommel is dead.
His army has joined the quicksand legions
of history where the battle is always
a metal echo saluting a rusty shadow.
His tanks are gone.
How's your ass?
"Rommel Drives on Deep into Egypt" (1970)
