= An Unfortunate Woman: A Journey =

1994 novel by Richard Brautigan

Cahier d'un Retour de Troie
- First English edition
- Author: Richard Brautigan
- Original title: An Unfortunate Woman: A Journey
- Translator: Marc Chénetier
- Language: French
- Publisher: Bourgois
- Publication date: 1994
- Publication place: France
- Media type: Print (Hardback)
- Pages: 110 (U.S. edition)
- ISBN: 0-312-26243-4 (U.S. edition)
- Preceded by: So the Wind Won't Blow It All Away

An Unfortunate Woman: A Journey is Richard Brautigan's eleventh and final published novel. Written in 1982, it was first published (posthumously) in 1994 in a French translation, Cahier d'un Retour de Troie ["Diary of a Return from Troy"]. The first edition in English did not appear until 2000, when it was produced by St. Martin's Press.

An Unfortunate Woman assumes the form of a traveler's journal, chronicling the protagonist's journey and his oblique ruminations on the suicide of one woman and the death from cancer of a close friend.
