= Edmund Shea =

American photographer

- Born: August 15, 1942; Cambridge, Massachusetts, United States
- Died: September 17, 2004 (aged 62); San Francisco
- Known for: Photography

Edmund Shea (August 15, 1942 – September 17, 2004) was an American photographer based in San Francisco.

Shea's work is featured on book covers, including works by Richard Brautigan and Hunter S. Thompson, and record album covers for music by Fleetwood Mac, Keith Jarrett, Herbie Hancock and Charles Lloyd.

== Education and early work ==
Shea entered San Francisco State University as a writing student in the early 1960s, but his major changed to photography after his first year of college.

In addition to his own work, Shea worked as a printer of photographs for artists including Imogen Cunningham.

== Projects and collaborations ==
- 1973 Memorial Tribute to Diane Arbus
  An exhibit at the De Saisset Museum that included three of Shea's works following the death of his friend Arbus
- 1975 Bruce Conner photograms
- 1975 Media Burn by Ant Farm
  Shea's uncredited photographs of the event became part of a traveling exhibit.
  A compilation of news clips about the event is presented by Mediaburn.org
- 1983 The Maltese Falcon, by Dashiell Hammett
  Reissued by Arion Publishers and illustrated with Shea's contemporary photographs of actual streets and buildings featured in the 1929 novel.

== Book covers ==
- In Watermelon Sugar
- The Pill Versus the Springhill Mine Disaster
- Revenge of the Lawn
- The Abortion: An Historical Romance 1966
- Rommel Drives on Deep into Egypt

== Lawsuit over Lenny Bruce photograph ==
Shea had been friends with comedian Lenny Bruce and had photographed Bruce on more than one occasion. One photograph taken in 1966 of Lenny and Kitty Bruce was used without attribution and without copyright notice by Fantasy Records on the album, Live at the Curran Theater, recorded in 1961 but not released until 1971. Shea discussed the violation with Fantasy representative Ralph J. Gleason in 1972, but he did not seek a copyright remedy in court until 2002. At that time Shea's claim was dismissed after a successful laches argument by Fantasy lawyers .

Shea died in 2004 from metastatic esophageal cancer.

== See also ==
- Maximum Darkness, album with interior photos
- Future Games, album with interior photos
