= The Hawkline Monster: A Gothic Western =

1974 novel by Richard Brautigan

- First edition
- Author: Richard Brautigan
- Cover artist: Wendell Minor
- Language: English
- Genre: Gothic Western
- Publisher: Simon & Schuster
- Publication date: September 1974
- Publication place: United States
- Media type: Print (hardback & paperback)
- Pages: 216
- ISBN: 0-671-21809-3 (hardback edition)
- OCLC: 868088
- Dewey Decimal: 813/.5/4
- LC Class: PZ4.B826 Haw PS3503.R2736
- Preceded by: The Abortion: An Historical Romance 1966
- Followed by: Willard and His Bowling Trophies: A Perverse Mystery

The Hawkline Monster: A Gothic Western is a novel by Richard Brautigan first published in 1974. The novel is his fifth published novel, and a parody of Western and Gothic novels.

== Plot ==
Taking place mainly in eastern Oregon in 1902, the story concerns a pair of morally ambivalent gunmen, Cameron and Greer. On a job in Hawaii, they are stopped by the fact their target is with his son. After returning to California they spend some time in a brothel, where a young Native American-looking woman, Magic Child, comes to hire them for a job at her house. Along the way they stop at a place to eat and during the meal hear loud gunshot-like noises. That night Magic Child sleeps with both men and Greer takes quite a liking to her.

When they reach the house, in the middle of the western plains on a ninety-degree day, it is surrounded by snow. Miss Hawkline comes to greet them and they realize that Magic Child is her twin sister. As soon as they enter the house the women's personalities change and they explain that they brought the men here to hunt down and destroy the "monster" living in the "ice caves" beneath the house. Miss Hawkline and her sister (also called "Miss Hawkline") believe that the monster has killed their father, a Harvard scientist who disappeared while hard at work in his basement laboratory on a project referred to only as "The Chemicals," which would, he claimed, if perfected, be a great boon to the human race. During the conversation the four characters realize that The Chemicals are somehow altering their minds to make them lose track of what they are discussing. Then, the large family butler suddenly dies, and shrinks into a little person.

As the story unfolds, it becomes apparent that the monster is not a physical being; rather it is a prank created by The Chemicals, which manifest themselves as a "light" that flies mischievously around the house. After all the strange happenings, evidently designed to distract them, Cameron pours a glass of whiskey into the beaker containing The Chemicals. This kills the monster, destroys the house and turns the father back into a human being (he had been an umbrella basket the whole time). The butler returns to normal size and comes back to life. Cameron and Greer marry the two sisters, and the story ends, but an epilogue states that the sisters eventually divorced the two men.

== Adaptations ==
For many years filmmaker Hal Ashby unsuccessfully attempted to make a film adaptation of the book. Actors Jack Nicholson, Harry Dean Stanton and Jeff Bridges were all considered for the lead roles. Brautigan wrote a screenplay which Ashby rejected. When asked to write a second draft, Brautigan turned him down, and the film was never made. Director Tim Burton also tried to make a film version. Nicholson and Clint Eastwood were attached to star, but after Eastwood left the project, so did Nicholson. Eventually Burton also left. In June 2019, Deadline Hollywood reported that New Regency acquired the rights, with Roy Lee, Andrew Trapani, and Steven Schneider set to produce the film adaptation with Yorgos Lanthimos in talks to direct.

The English pop band Saint Etienne has also recorded and released a theoretical soundtrack for an imagined film of the book on their 2002 fan-club exclusively released album Asleep at the Wheels of Steel.
