= Statue of Benjamin Franklin (San Francisco) =

Statue of Benjamin Franklin in Washington Square, San Francisco, California, U.S.

Benjamin Franklin
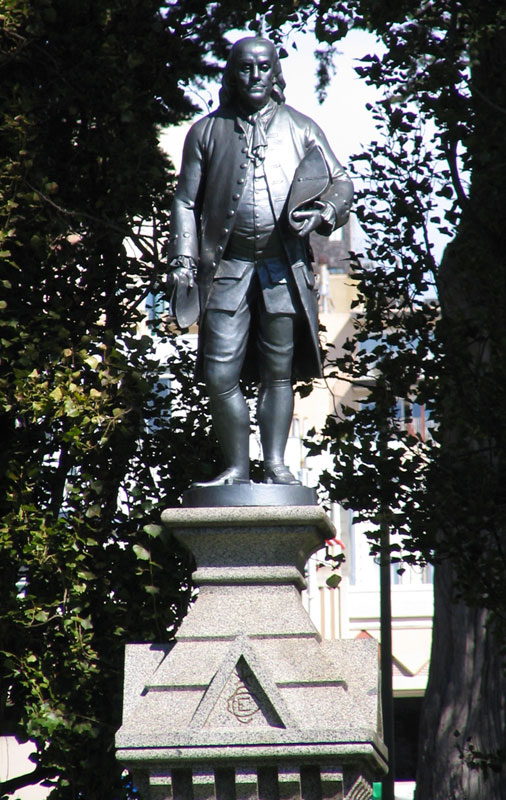
- The statue in 2007
- Artist: Unknown
- Type: Sculpture
- Medium: Sculpture: Bronze; Base: Granite
- Subject: Benjamin Franklin
- Location: San Francisco, California, United States; 37.80082°N 122.41000°W

Benjamin Franklin – also known as the Benjamin Franklin Memorial, Benjamin Franklin Statue and Cogswell Historical Monument – is an outdoor sculpture in Washington Square, San Francisco, California.

== Description ==
The smaller-than-life-size bronze statue of American Founding Father Benjamin Franklin, by an unknown sculptor, stands upon an ornate granite base, that contains a time capsule. There are inscriptions on all four sides of the base. Spigots once dispensed drinking water into three stone basins. The spigots have been removed.

== History ==
Created as a Temperance fountain by crusader Henry D. Cogswell, the monument was originally installed at Kearny and Market Streets in 1879. In 1904, it was relocated to Washington Square.

In 1979, 100 years after its creation, a time capsule that was hidden in the statue's base was removed and opened, and contained Cogswell's personal papers. A new time capsule, to be opened in 2079, was installed.

== In popular culture ==
The statue is visible behind Richard Brautigan and Michaela Le Grand on the original cover of Brautigan's 1967 novel Trout Fishing in America.

== See also ==
- Benjamin Franklin in popular culture
- Drinking fountains in the United States
