= Kat Meoz =

American singer-songwriter

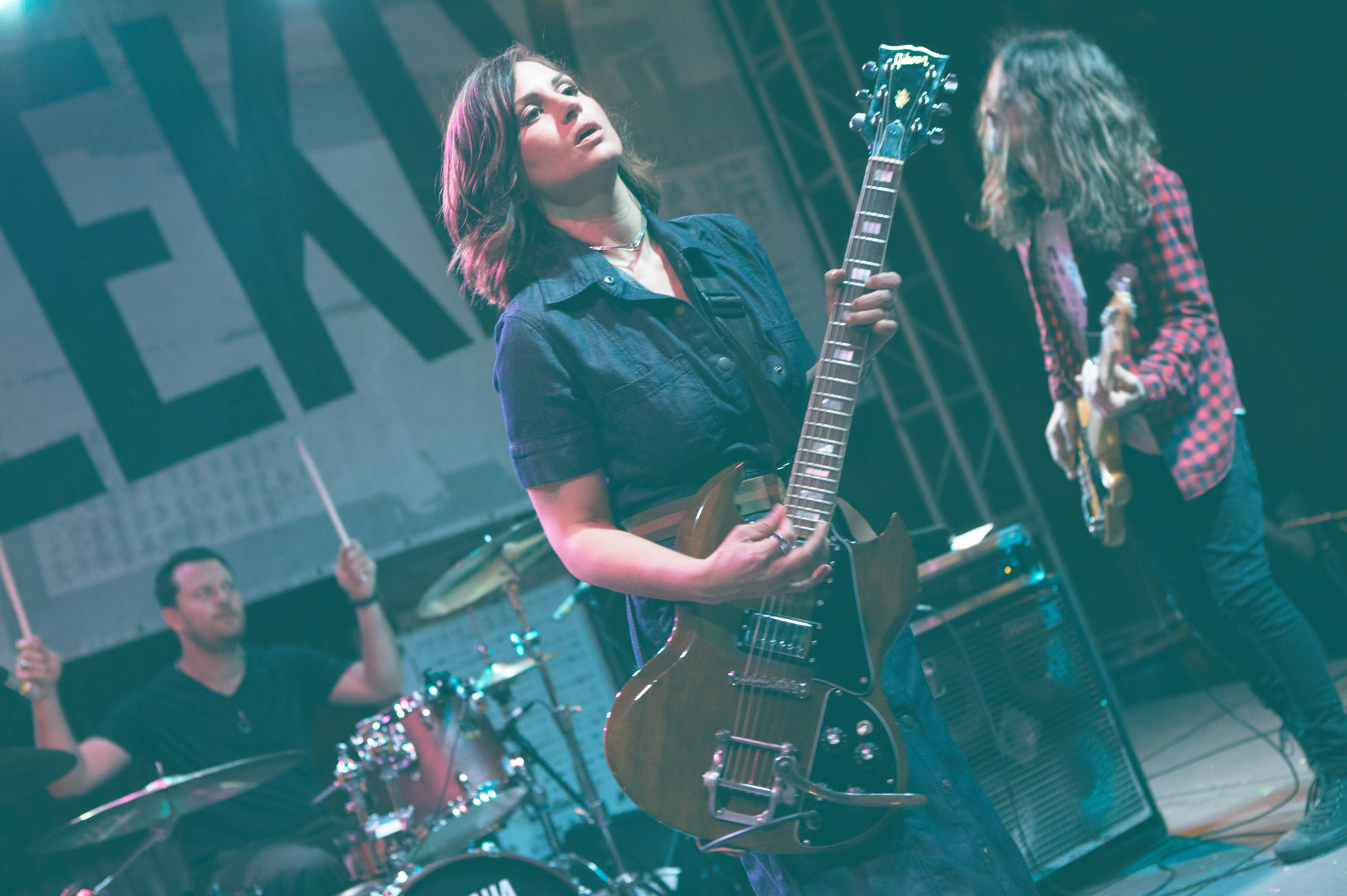
- Meoz performing in September 2016

Background information
- Born: Katherine Alexandra Meoz; United States
- Instruments: Vocals, Guitar, Bass, Keys
- Years active: 2003-Present
- Labels: Cloudkid, 7 Clouds, Position Music, Bodan Kuma Recordings
- Website: gritnoise.com

Katherine "Kat" Alexandra Meoz (born July 27, 1988) is a Venezuelan-American singer-songwriter, composer, soundtrack and record producer.

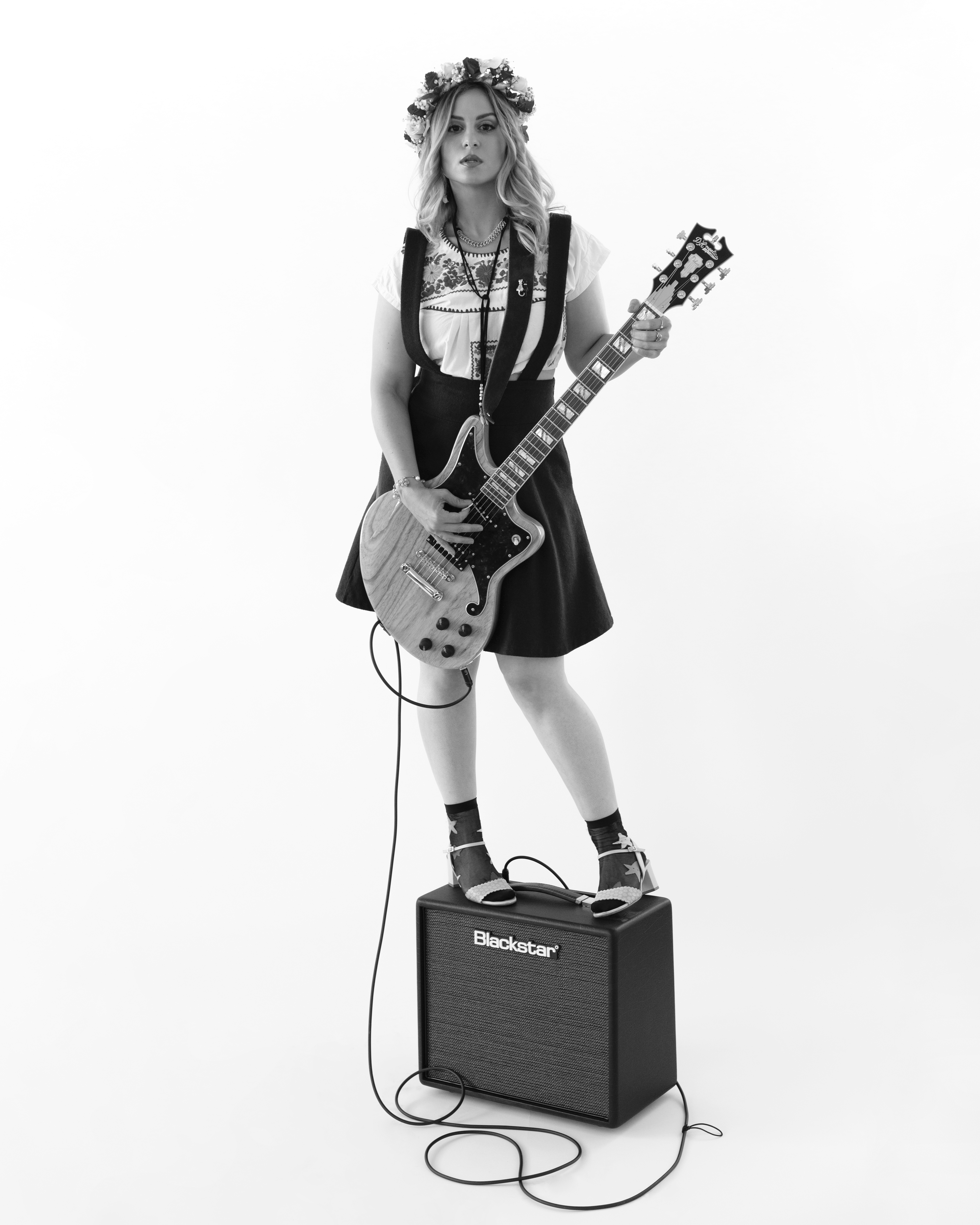
Kat Meoz is endorsed by Blackstar Amplification and D'Angelico Guitars

== Career ==
The first ever televised composition from Meoz was the theme song for show Knock First which ran on ABC Family for 6 episodes in its second season from 2003 to 2004.

In 2014, Meoz produced the entire soundtrack for feature film The Dust Storm. Three of Meoz's original songs in the film were performed by actor Colin O'Donoghue.

The founder and principal songwriter for the self-titled garage rock blues project, Kat Meoz(f.k.a. GRIT). Her debut EP LA Don't Love You was released by indie label Bodan Kuma Recordings (The Subways, EFG, Detroit Rebellion) in June 2017. The first official music video released was shot and directed by Troma Entertainment director Kansas Bowling in August 2017 for song LA Don't Love You. The video and song which stars Lloyd Kaufman caught the attention of legendary radio DJ Rodney Bingenheimer who put the song in regular rotation on Sirius XM Holdings (Little Steven's Underground Garage).

In 2016 and 2017, Meoz had three songs placed on reality television series the Bad Girls Club: Cold Blooded, Fool's Gold, and LA Don't Love You.

In October 2017, filmmaker Kansas Bowling and Meoz shot the only existing footage of Richard Brautigan's papier-mâché bird and subject of his book Willard and His Bowling Trophies, Willard, for a music video for Meoz's song "Here I Wait". The song was released January 2018 on Bodan Kuma Records and premiered on Pop Matters.

In November 2017, Meoz was included on Rodney Bingenheimer's Christmas compilation album, Santa's Got a GTO Vol.2. For which Meoz composed an original Christmas song, "Christmas in Hollywood". The compilation, released on limited edition vinyl through Gearhead Records, included artists such as C. J. Ramone and Clem Burke.

Meoz was asked by Jennie Vee to join her solo project: Jennie Vee & The Garden of Eden as a rhythm guitar player in 2017, the act toured with Swedish band INVSN in California. In late December 2017, Meoz was asked to sing background vocals for Iggy Azalea and Quavo on the recording of their 2018 single release, Savior. Meoz performed for their track at Westlake Recording Studios in Los Angeles. The song and Meoz's voice went on to be featured in a Super Bowl LII commercial for Monster Products' headphones. The commercial stars Azalea, Joe Perry (musician), RiceGum, Yo Gotti, and Joey Fatone.

As an actress, Meoz was cast in a Motel 6 commercial, which began running nationally March 1, 2018, a give-away commercial campaign from Marlboro (cigarette) which ran in late 2018 (internet only), and a tourism commercial for the city of West Hollywood, California which began running globally in January 2019 for Visit the USA.

In April 2019, Meoz's song, "Don't You Worry" appeared on ABC Studios television series Station 19, episode 211; and then again on Freeform in March 2020 for episode 4007 of The Bold Type, starring Raven Simone.

In July 2019, Meoz released the Royalty EP through Position Music, which garnered attention from popular YouTube channels such as Cloudkid, and Gyuuki Nightcore. A major license for the song Whatever I Want with the trailer for PlayStation's: Lara Croft Shadow of the Tomb Raider Definitive edition, which first began airing in October 2019. In February 2021 Whatever I Want received its second major license in a commercial for Pepsi airing in the territory of Mexico and starring comedian Daniel Sosa.

In 2020, Meoz had multiple placements including an unreleased song on the 2019–2020 season of The CW's SuperGirl, Are You Ready in a Sony-Xperia COD mobile spot, and Royalty was placed in Chris Hemworth's fitness launch (internet only) for Centr 6.

In March 2020, Meoz released an EP of cover songs, titled KVRZ. Most notably her cover of Blondie's One Way or Another was used in a promotional spot which began airing for season 18 of NCIS in September 2020. Another recording from the KVRZ EP, Tainted Love was used in Hulu's 2022 show Wedding Season.

2020 also marked the beginning of releasing music under UMG label Cloudkid. Three singles released: Back For More, Somebody Else and Run Tonight. Somebody Else was co-promoted by TrapNation and produced by Birk B of Denmark.

In 2021, Meoz newly began releasing under label 7Clouds, whose YouTube channel exceeds 10 million subscribers, the first single Reason came out March 12, 2021. The single was written by Meoz and produced by Birk B.

Meoz's music has been featured twice on Love Island, first in 2021 and then again in July 2022 for another season.
