= All Watched Over by Machines of Loving Grace (TV series) =

BBC television documentary series by filmmaker Adam Curtis

- Written by: Adam Curtis
- Directed by: Adam Curtis
- Country of origin: United Kingdom
- Original language: English
- No. of series: 1
- No. of episodes: 3

Production
- Executive producer: Dominic Crossley-Holland
- Producers: Lucy Kelsall; Adam Macqueen; James Harkin; Andrew Orlowski
- Running time: 180 minutes (in three parts)
- Production company: BBC

Original release
- Network: BBC Two
- Release: 23 May – 6 June 2011

All Watched Over by Machines of Loving Grace is a BBC television documentary series by filmmaker Adam Curtis. In the series, Curtis argues that computers have failed to liberate humanity, and instead have "distorted and simplified our view of the world around us." The title is taken from a 1967 poem of the same name by Richard Brautigan. The first episode was originally broadcast at 9 pm on 23 May 2011.

== Episodes ==
=== Part 1. 'Love and Power' ===
In the first episode, Curtis traces the effects of Ayn Rand's ideas on American financial markets, particularly via the influence of Alan Greenspan, who was a member of a reading group called the Collective, which discussed her work and her philosophy of Objectivism. While Rand's novels were critically savaged, they inspired people working in the technology sector of Silicon Valley, leading to the emergence of the Californian Ideology, a techno-utopian belief that computer networks could measure, control and help to stabilise societies without hierarchical political control. Rand had an affair with Nathaniel Branden, another member of The Collective, with the approval of Branden's wife, Barbara Branden. The affair would eventually end acrimoniously and the Collective disbanded. Rand's circle of friends contracted considerably, though Greenspan remained loyal to her.

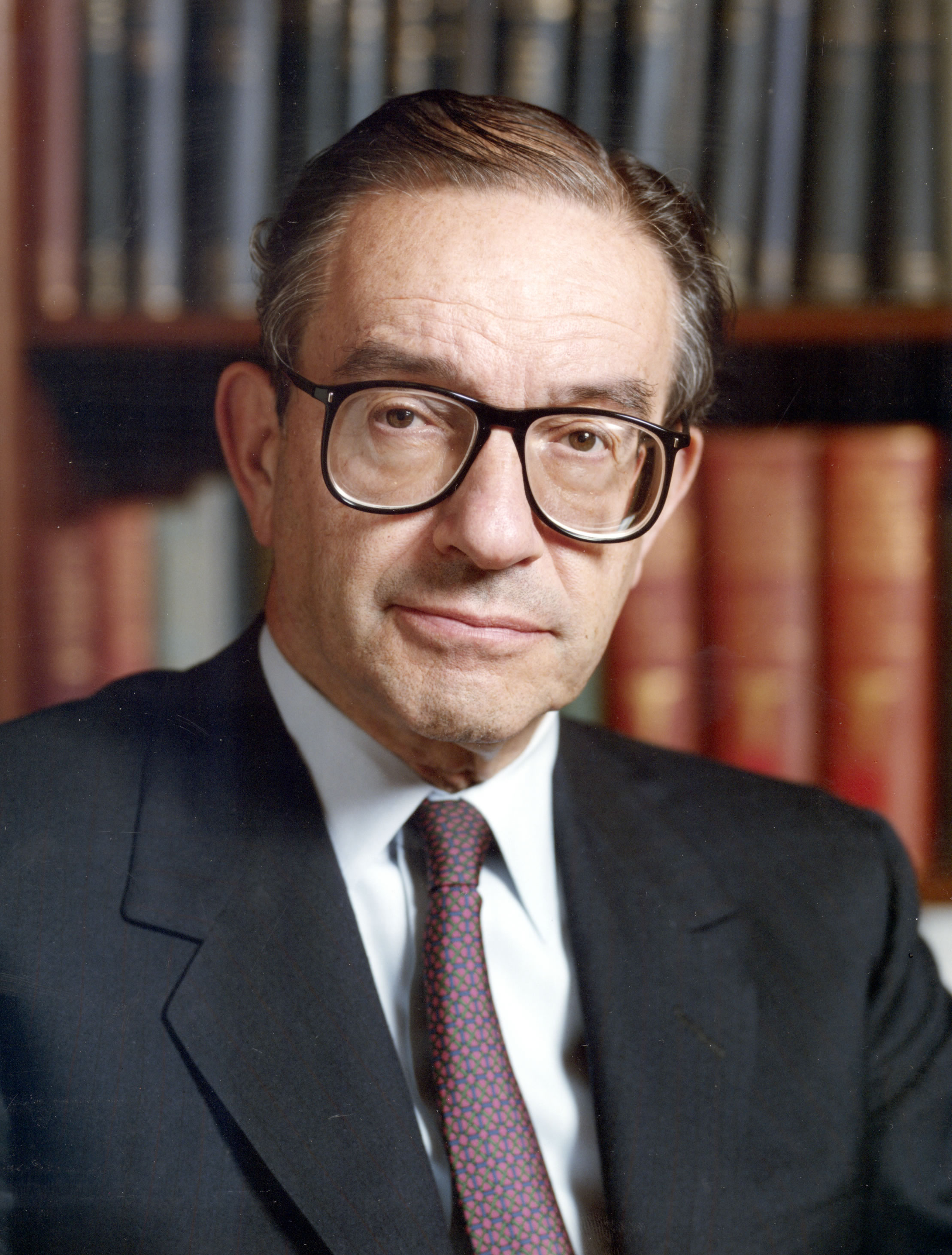
Alan Greenspan

Greenspan entered government in the 1970s and became Chairman of the Federal Reserve. In 1992, he visited the newly elected Bill Clinton and persuaded him to curtail U.S. government intervention in the economy, letting the markets manage themselves with the help of computer modelling to predict risks and hedge against them, a paradigm named "the New Economy". However, by 1996, production figures failed to increase, but profits were nevertheless rising. Greenspan worried that unsustainable speculative bubbles were forming, but after political attacks from all sides, Greenspan changed his reasoning and suggested that new efficiencies had emerged that his data wasn't measuring. In parallel with this, American investors began pouring large sums of money into economies in eastern Asia, though the Council of Economic Advisers, led by Joseph Stiglitz, began warning that these economies were much more fragile than they seemed. However, these warnings did not reach the president, having been blocked by Robert Rubin, who feared damage to financial interests.

The 1997 Asian financial crisis began as the property bubble in the Far East began to burst in, first in Thailand, then later in South Korea and Indonesia, causing large financial losses in those countries that greatly affected foreign investors. While Bill Clinton was preoccupied with the Monica Lewinsky scandal, Robert Rubin took control of foreign policy and forced loans onto the affected countries. However, after each country agreed to be bailed out by the IMF, foreign investors immediately withdrew their money, destroying their economies and leaving their taxpayers with enormous debts.

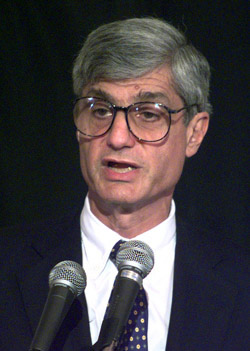
Robert Rubin

Alan Greenspan would rise to greater prominence after his handling of the economic effects of the September 11 attacks, later cutting interest rates in the wake of the Enron scandal in a bid to stimulate the economy. Unusually, this triggered a consumer boom without creating inflation, creating new certainty that the New Economy truly existed. However, in reality, to avoid a repeat of the earlier economic crises in East Asia, China's Politburo had decided to influence America's economy via similar techniques to those used by America on other Far Eastern countries. By keeping China's exchange rate artificially low, they sold cheap goods to America, using the proceeds to buy American bonds. The money flooding into America reduced the perception of risk in signing loans to lower income clients, permitting lending beyond the point that was actually sustainable. The high level of loan defaulting that followed led ultimately to the 2008 financial crisis, caused by the collapse of a housing bubble similar to that which Far Eastern countries had previously faced.

In 1994, Carmen Hermosillo published a widely influential essay online, "Pandora's Vox: On Community in Cyberspace", and it began to be argued that the use of computer networks had led not to a reduction in hierarchy, but actually a commodification of personality and a complex transfer of power and information to corporations. Curtis ends the piece by pointing out that not only has the idea of market stability failed to bear out in practice, but that the Californian Ideology has also been unable to bring about long-term stability. Curtis contends that the ideology had not freed its proponents from hierarchies, but has instead trapped them in a rigid system of control from which they are unable to escape.

==== Contributors ====
- Barbara Branden, member of Ayn Rand's circle, 1950s
- John McCaskey, Digital Entrepreneur, Silicon Valley, 1990s
- Kevin O'Connor, Internet Entrepreneur, Silicon Valley, 1990s
- Loren Carpenter and Rachel Carpenter
- Kevin Kelly, Wired Magazine
- Stewart Brand, Global Business Network
- Alvin Toffler, Digital Futurologist
- Peter Schwartz, Global Business Network
- Kenichi Ohmae, author, The End of the Nation State
- Nathaniel Branden, Ayn Rand's lover
- Joan Mitchell
- Stephen Roach, Chief Economist, Morgan Stanley 1990s
- Joseph Stiglitz, Head of the Council of Economic Advisers 1995–97
- Robert Rubin, US Secretary of the Treasury 1995–99

=== Part 2. 'The Use and Abuse of Vegetational Concepts' ===
In the 1960s, an idea penetrated deep into the public imagination that nature is a self-regulating ecosystem, there is a natural order," Curtis says. "The trouble is, it's not true – as many ecologists have shown, nature is never stable, it's always changing.

This episode investigates how ideas such as cybernetics and systems theory were applied to natural ecosystems, creating a mechanical view of the natural world, and how this relates to the false idea that there is a balance of nature. The idea of ecosystems was proposed in 1935 by Arthur Tansley, an English botanist, based on his belief that the whole of the natural world operated as a series of interconnected networks. Taken together with Jay Forrester's work in cybernetic systems, which posited that all networks are regulated by feedback loops, the belief emerged that the natural world is composed of self-regulating ecosystems that tends towards balance and equilibrium. Norbert Wiener laid out the position that humans, machines and ecology are simply nodes in a network in his book Cybernetics, or Control and Communication in the Animal and the Machine, and this book became the bible of cybernetics. Brothers Howard T. Odum and Eugene Odum, both ecologists, further developed these ideas; Howard collected data from ecological systems and built electronic networks to simulate them, and his brother Eugene then took these ideas and generalised them to the whole of ecology. The idea that the natural world tended towards balance became conventional wisdom among scientists.

In the 1960s, Buckminster Fuller popularised a radically new kind of structure, the geodesic dome, which emulated ecosystems in being made of highly connected, relatively weak parts, which built a stronger structure. It was applied to the radomes covering early warning systems in the Arctic. His other system-based ideas inspired the counterculture movement. Communes of people who saw themselves as nodes in a network, without hierarchy, and applied feedback to try to control and stabilise their societies, used his geodesic domes as habitats. Around this time, Stewart Brand filmed a demonstration of a networked computer system with a graphics display, mouse and keyboard that he believed would save the world by empowering people, in a similar way to the communes, to be free as individuals. In 1967, Richard Brautigan published the poetry work All Watched Over by machines of Loving Grace, which promoted the idea of a cybernetic ecological utopia consisting of a fusion of computers and organisms living in perfect harmony and stability.

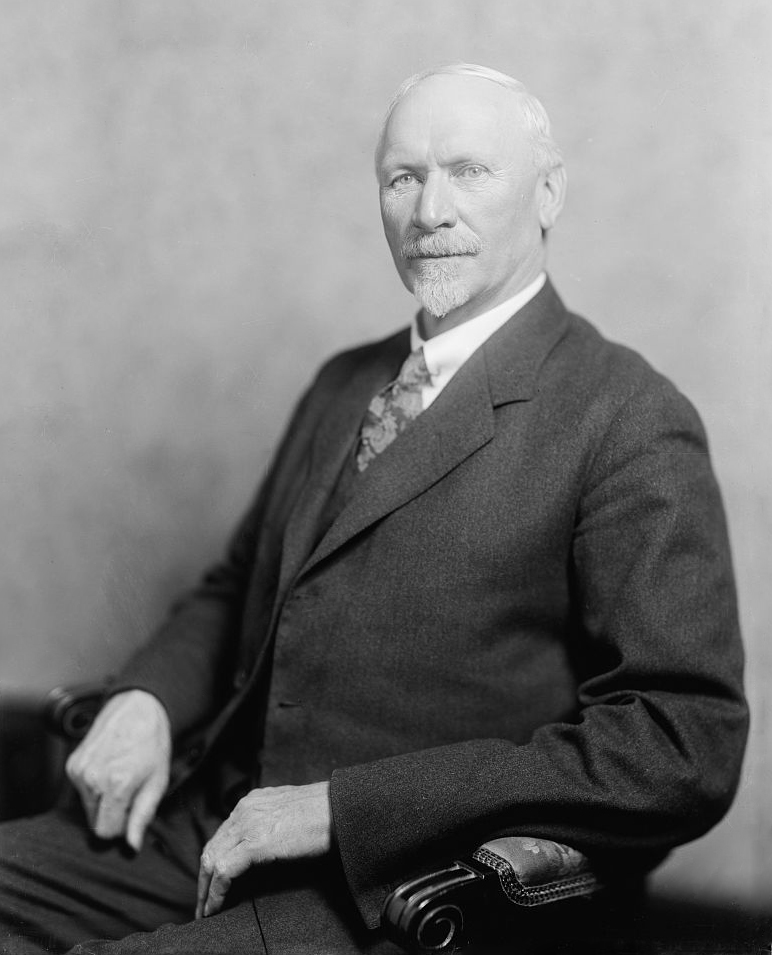
Jan Smuts

By the 1970s, new challenges emerged that could not be solved by normal hierarchical systems, such as overpopulation, limited natural resources and pollution. Jay Forrester applied systems theory to the problem and drew a cybernetic system diagram for the world. This was turned into a computer model which predicted population collapse. This became the basis of the model that was used by the Club of Rome, and the findings from this were published in The Limits to Growth. Forrester then argued for zero growth in order to maintain a steady equilibrium within the capacity of the Earth. However, this was opposed by many people within the environmental movement, since the model did not allow for people to change their values to stabilise the world, and they argued that the model tried to maintain and enforce the current political hierarchy. Critics compared Forrester's ideas to a dispute between Arthur Tansley and Field Marshal Jan Smuts. Smuts had invented a philosophy called holism, where everyone had a 'rightful place', which was to be managed by the white race, which Tansley called an "abuse of vegetational concepts." The 70s protestors claimed that the same conceptual abuse of the supposed natural order was occurring, that it was really being used for political control.

The belief in the stability of natural systems began to break down when a study was made of the predator-prey relationship of wolves and elks. It was found that populations of predators and prey had varied wildly over centuries. Other studies then found huge variations, and a significant lack of homeostasis in natural systems. George Van Dyne then tried to build a computer model to try to simulate a complete ecosystem based on extensive real-world data, to show how the stability of natural systems actually worked. To his surprise, the computer model did not stabilise like the Odums' electrical model had. The reason for this lack of stabilisation was that he had used extensive data which more accurately reflected reality, whereas the Odums and other ecologists had "ruthlessly simplified nature." The scientific idea had thus been shown to fail, but the popular idea remained in currency, and even grew as it apparently offered the possibility of a new egalitarian world order.

In 2003, a wave of spontaneous revolutions swept through Asia and Europe. Coordinated only via the internet, nobody seemed to be in overall charge, and no overall aims except self-determination and freedom were apparent. This seemed to justify the beliefs of the computer utopians. However, the freedom from these revolutions lasted for only a short time, with most of the countries falling back into political corruption almost immediately. Curtis compares them with the hippy communes, all of which broke up within a few years, as aggressive members of the group began to bully the weaker ones, who were unable to band together in their own defence because formal power structures were prohibited by the commune's rules, and even intervention against bullying by benevolent individuals was discouraged.

Curtis closes the episode by stating that it has become apparent that while the self-organising network is good at organising change, they fail to provide direction for determining what comes afterwards; networks leave people helpless in the face of those who already wield political power.

==== Contributors ====
- Peder Anker, historian of ecology
- Jay Forrester, systems theorist
- Fred Turner, historian of media and technology
- Peter J. Taylor, historian of science
- Dr Daniel Botkin, ecologist
- Randall Gibson, former member of 'Synergia' commune
- Molly Hollenbach, former member of 'The Family' commune
- Stewart Brand
- Alexander King, co-founder of the Club of Rome (archive)
- Tord Björk, environmental activist
- Dr Steward Pickett, ecologist
- Dr Dave Swift and Dr Sam Bledsoe, Grasslands Project
- Al Gore, former US Vice President
- Dr Laura J. Cameron, historical geographer

=== Part 3. 'The Monkey in the Machine and the Machine in the Monkey' ===
This episode looks into the selfish gene theory invented by William Hamilton, which holds that humans are machines controlled by genes. Curtis also covers the source of ethnic conflict that was created by Belgian colonialism's artificial creation of a racial divide and the ensuing slaughter that occurred in the Democratic Republic of the Congo, which is a source of raw material for computers and cell phones.

In the 1930s, Armand Denis made films that told the world about Africa. However, his documentary gave fanciful stories about Rwanda's Tutsis being a noble ruling elite originally from Egypt, whereas the Hutus were a peasant race. In reality, they were racially the same, but the Belgian rulers had ruthlessly exploited the myth to divide the Rwandan people. But when it came to independence, liberal Belgians felt guilty, and decided the Hutus should overthrow the Tutsi rule. This led to a bloodbath, as the Tutsis were then seen as aliens and were slaughtered.

In 1960, Congo had become independent from Belgium, but governance promptly collapsed, and towns became battle grounds as soldiers fought for control of the mines. America and the Belgians organised a coup, and the elected leader, Patrice Lumumba, was kidnapped and executed, causing chaos. However, the Western mining operations were initially largely unaffected. Mobutu Sese Seko was installed as president, killed his opponents and stopped a liberal democracy from forming. Mobutu changed the Congo's name to Zaire, looting millions of dollars and letting mines and industries collapse.

In Congo, with a civil war ongoing, Dian Fossey, who was researching gorillas, was captured. She escaped and created a new camp high up on a mountain in Rwanda, where she continued to study gorillas. She tried to completely protect the gorillas, which were very susceptible to human diseases and were hated because they terrorised the local people. Fossey sabotaged the local people's traps and tried to terrorise them by claiming to cast spells on them. Ultimately, Fossey's favourite gorilla, Digit, was killed by the vengeful locals. Curtis draws a parallel between Fossey and the colonialists who oppressed the Congolese, describing her as one of many westerners who brutalised and terrorised African peoples for their own high-minded ideals.

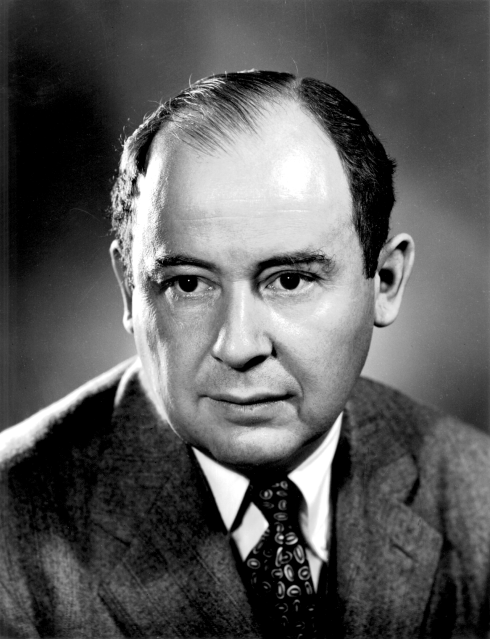
John von Neumann in the 1940s

William Hamilton was a solitary man who saw everything through the lens of Darwin's theory of evolution. He wanted to know why some ants and humans give up their life for others. In 1963, he realised that most of the behaviours of humans were due to genes, and he began looking at humans from the genes' point of view. From this perspective, humans were machines that were only important for carrying genes, and it made sense for a gene to sacrifice a human if it meant that another copy of the gene would survive. In 1967, American chemist George R. Price went to London after reading Hamilton's little-known papers and discovering that his equations for the behaviours of genes were equivalent to computers equations. He was able to show that these equations explained murder, warfare, suicide, goodness and spite, since these actions could help the genes. John von Neumann had invented self-reproducing machines, but Price was able to show that the self-reproducing machines were already in existence – humans were such machines.

These revelations had an enormous effect on Price. Previously a staunch rationalist, Price began to believe that these equations had been given to him by God, even though some argue that they are evidence against the existence of God. In 1973, after converting to extreme Christianity as a last chance to disprove the selfish gene theories' gloomy conclusions, Price decided to start helping poor and homeless people, giving away all his possessions in acts of random kindness. These efforts utterly failed, and he came to believe that he was being followed by the hound of heaven. He finally revealed, in his suicide note, that these acts of altruism brought more harm than good to the lives of homeless people. Richard Dawkins later took Hamilton and Price's equations and popularised them, explaining that humans are simply machines created by the selfish genes. Curtis likens this to "reinventing the immortal soul," but as computer code in the form of the genes.

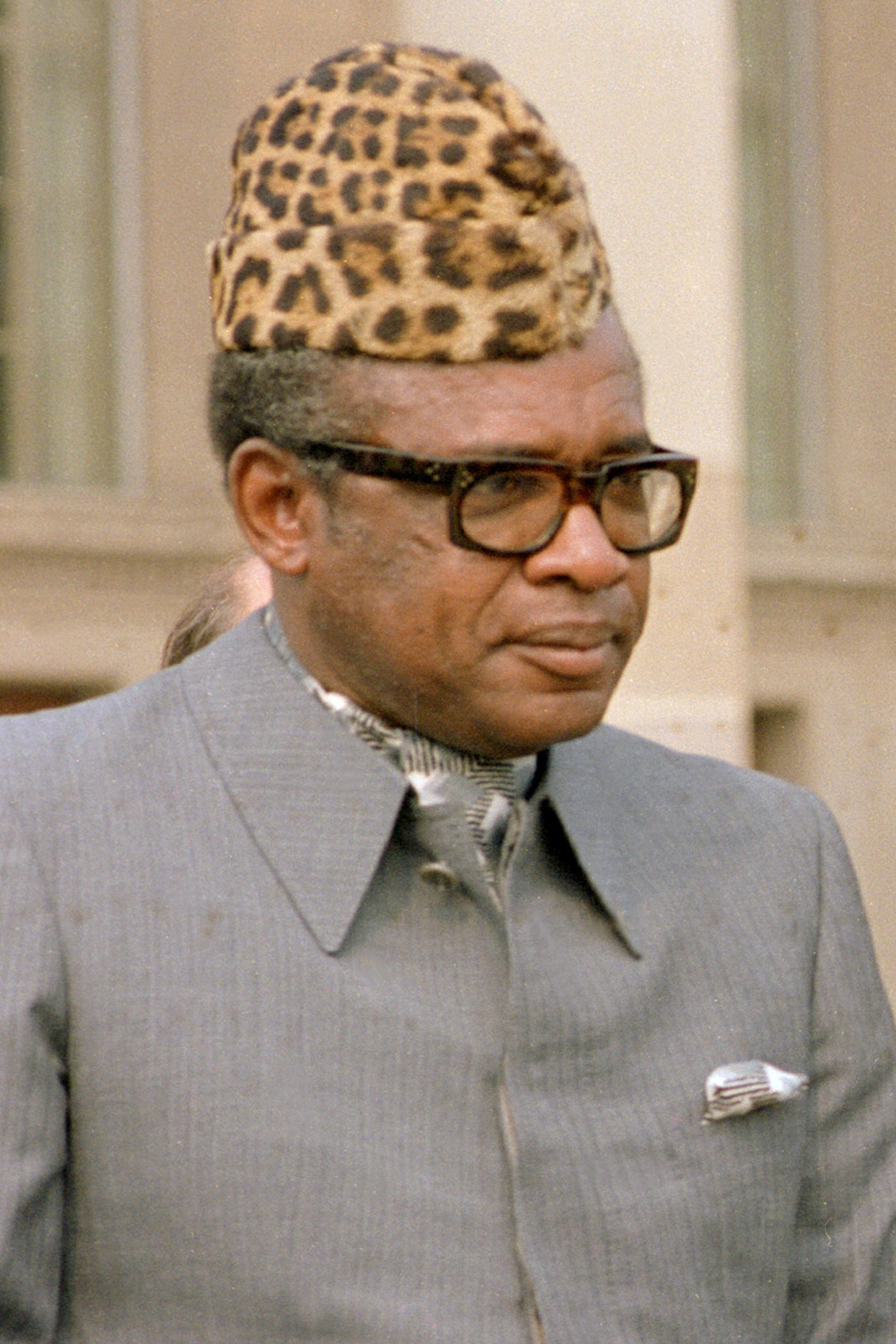
President Mobutu

In 1994, the ruling Hutu government set out to eradicate the Tutsi minority. This was explained as incomprehensible ancient rivalry by the Western press. In reality it was due to the Belgian myth created during the colonial rule. Western agencies got involved, and the Tutsi fought back, creating chaos. Many flooded across the border into Zaire, and the Tutsi invaded the refugee camps to get revenge. Mobutu fell from power. Troops arrived from many countries, allegedly to help, but in reality to gain access to the country's natural resources, used to produce consumer goods for the West. Altogether, 4.5 million people were killed.

By this point Hamilton was well-honoured. However, by now he supported eugenics and believed that the help provided to the ill and disabled by modern medicine was counter to the logic of genes. He heard a story that HIV had been created from an accident with a polio vaccine, which it was thought could have been contaminated with a chimp virus. This supported his idea that modern medicine could have negative consequences. Hamilton travelled to Kisangani in the Democratic Republic of the Congo while the Second Congo War was raging. He went there to collect Chimpanzee faeces to test his theory that HIV was due to a medical mistake. While there he caught malaria, for which he took aspirin, which lodged in his gut, causing a haemorrhage which killed him. His hypothesis about the creation of AIDS would ultimately be entirely debunked.

Curtis ends the episode by saying that Hamilton's ideas that humans are computers controlled by the genes have become accepted wisdom. But he asks whether we have accepted a fatalistic philosophy that humans are helpless computers to explain and excuse the fact that, as in the Congo, we are effectively unable to improve and change the world.

==== Contributors ====
- Prof. Michael Ruse, friend of William Hamilton
- Kathleen Price, George Price's daughter
- Edward Teller (archive)
- James Schwartz, George Price's biographer
- William Hamilton (interviewed 1999)

== Interviews and reviews ==
In May 2011, Adam Curtis was interviewed about the series by Katharine Viner in The Guardian, by the Register and by Little Atoms.

Catherine Gee at The Daily Telegraph said that what Adam Curtis reveals, "is the dangers of human beings at their most selfish and self-satisfying. Showing no compassion or consideration for your fellow human beings creates a chasm between those able to walk over others and those too considerate – or too short-sighted – to do so."

John Preston also reviewed the first episode, and said that although it showed flashes of brilliance, it had an "infuriating glibness too as the web of connectedness became ever more stretched. No one could dispute that Curtis has got a very big bite indeed. But what about the chewing, you ask. There wasn't any – or nothing like enough of it to prevent a bad case of mental indigestion."

Andrew Anthony published a review in The Observer and The Guardian, and commented on the central premise that we had been made to "believe we could create a stable world that would last for ever" but that he doesn't "recall ever believing that 'we' could create a stable world that would last for ever", and noted that: "For the film-maker there seems to be an objective reality that a determined individual can penetrate if he is willing to challenge the confining chimeras of markets and machines. Forget the internet tycoons. The Randian hero is Curtis himself."

== Music ==
Curtis's style is typified by the use of frequent and often incongruous cuts of film and music, often lasting only a fraction of a second, in a technique similar to sampling. Music often creates ironic contrast with archival footage, through associations with their original contexts. The theme from Carrie accompanies an account of Ayn Rand being abandoned by her lover, while music from Moon echoes the documentary's themes of alienation and technological control. Music used in the documentary includes:

- (Opening Credits) "Baby Love Child" from This Year's Girl by Pizzicato Five
- (Closing Credits) "Aua" from Monokini by Stereo Total
- "2 Ghosts I" from Ghosts I–IV by Nine Inch Nails
- "Right Where It Belongs" from With Teeth by Nine Inch Nails
- "Suzanne" from Songs of Leonard Cohen by Leonard Cohen – played during slow-motion coverage of Monica Lewinsky and Bill Clinton (Part 1)
- "Radioactivity" from Radio-Activity by Kraftwerk
- "Best Friends" from Twin Peaks: Fire Walk with Me (soundtrack) by Angelo Badalamenti
- "Forgive" from Burial by Burial
- "Welcome to Lunar Industries" from Moon by Clint Mansell
- "I'm Sam Bell" from Moon by Clint Mansell
- "Le Fiacre" by Jean Sablon
- "The Heavenly Music Corporation" from (No Pussyfooting) by Brian Eno and Robert Fripp
- "Monkey 23" from Keep on Your Mean Side by The Kills
- "Sally and Jack" from Blow Out by Pino Donaggio
- "Tristan und Isolde" by Richard Wagner
- "4 Sea Interludes, Op. 33a: I. Dawn" (Peter Grimes, Act II: Interlude) by Benjamin Britten
- "Theme from Carrie" from Carrie by Pino Donaggio
- "The Nursery" from Moon by Clint Mansell
- "A Warm Place" from The Downward Spiral by Nine Inch Nails
- "No Man's Land" by David Holmes
- "In Dreams" from In Dreams by Roy Orbison
- "Let Me Wrap My Arms Around You" from Music to Make Love By by Solomon Burke
- "On the Rebound" from On the Rebound by Floyd Cramer
- "Corona Radiata" from The Slip by Nine Inch Nails
- "Space Mystery" (Montage) and "The Toy Trumpet" from Manhattan Research Inc. by Raymond Scott
- "Parlez-moi d'amour" by Lucienne Boyer
- "Nocturne" from The Gadfly Suite by Dmitri Shostakovich
- "Once Upon a Time in the West" from Once Upon a Time in the West by Ennio Morricone
- "I Feel Love" from I Remember Yesterday by Donna Summer
- "Magnolia" from Magnolia by Jon Brion
- "Main Theme From The Fog" by John Carpenter
- "Escape from Wing Kong" from Big Trouble in Little China by John Carpenter
- "Zero Sum" from "Year Zero" by Nine Inch Nails

== See also ==
- Darwin among the Machines
