= The Abortion: An Historical Romance 1966 =

Novel by Richard Brautigan

- Front cover of The Abortion: An Historical Romance 1966.
- Author: Richard Brautigan
- Cover artist: Edmund Shea
- Language: English
- Publisher: Simon & Schuster
- Publication date: March 23, 1971
- Publication place: United States
- Media type: Print (hardback & paperback)
- Pages: 226 pages (hardcover)
- ISBN: 978-0-671-20872-1 (hardcover)
- OCLC: 132408
- Dewey Decimal: 813/.5/4
- LC Class: PZ4.B826 Ab PS3503.R2736
- Preceded by: The Revenge of the Lawn (1970)
- Followed by: The Hawkline Monster: A Gothic Western (1974)

The Abortion: An Historical Romance 1966 is a novel by Richard Brautigan first published in 1971 by Simon & Schuster. In subsequent printings the title is often shortened to simply The Abortion.

== Plot summary ==
The Abortion is a genre novel parody concerning the librarian of a very unusual California library which accepts books in any form and from anyone who wishes to drop one off at the library—children submit tales told in crayon about their toys; teenagers tell tales of angst and old people drop by with their memoirs—described as "the unwanted, the lyrical and haunted volumes of American writing" in the novel. Summoned by a silver bell at all hours, submissions are catalogued at the librarian's discretion; not by the Dewey Decimal system, but by placement on whichever magically dust-free shelf would, in the author's judgment, serve best as the book's home.

One day a woman named Vida appears at the library's door. Although shy and awkward she is described as the most beautiful woman in the world, who American admen "would have made into a national park if they would have gotten their hands on her." Vida falls in love with the reclusive librarian and soon becomes pregnant, necessitating a trip to Tijuana, Mexico, to secure an abortion.

== Characters ==
- Narrator: The main character is an unnamed narrator who lives and works at a library housing only unpublished manuscripts. He got the job from the previous librarian who quit because he feared children. The narrator has not left the library in three years. He meets a twenty-year-old woman named Vida, an attractive but awkward-acting woman who falls in love with him. When Vida becomes pregnant they travel to Tijuana, Mexico, to secure an abortion. When he and Vida return from Tijuana, he loses his job at the library to a middle-aged woman.
- Vida: Vida is the supporting character in the story. She meets the narrator in the library when she brings in a poetry collection about her body. She says she hates her body and hates that men keep looking at her. Vida's beauty killed a distracted driver who was looking at her. She falls in love with the narrator and they become intimate. Some weeks later, Vida discovers she is pregnant. During the course of their relationship Vida becomes more comfortable with her body and at the end of the novel is working in a topless bar.
- Foster: An exuberant, earthy, great-hearted man, Foster packages books from the library if the librarian is out of room and takes the overflow books to be stored in caves. Foster thinks the librarian's job is too monastic as well as a bit wacky. When the narrator and Vida have to leave for Tijuana, Foster has to watch over the library while they are gone. At the end, Foster lets a woman who has come to leave her book at the library watch over the place. The woman takes over, and the narrator loses his job.

== The Brautigan Library ==
In an homage to Richard Brautigan, The Abortion's concept was put into practice in the form of the Brautigan Library. Housed in a section of the larger Fletcher Free Library in Burlington, Vermont, the library accepts only unpublished manuscripts and had a catalogue of 325 works as of 2004.

According to the News from the Fletcher Free Library, there were once plans to move the Brautigan Library to the San Francisco Public Library. However, according to the Brautigan Library's website, the contents of the Library were moved to and put permanently on display at the Clark County Historical Museum (a Carnegie Library building like the San Francisco Library) in 2010. The Brautigan Library has since been moved to Vancouver, Washington, and is housed in the Clark County Historical Museum.

According to Episode 664 of the NPR Podcast "This American Life", Todd Lockwood, the founder of the real life version of The Brautigan Library, was inspired to try to build it, by the movie Field of Dreams (that centers on the line "If you build it, he will come"), once The Brautigan Library was built, he had an opportunity to meet with the author of the book which Field of Dreams was adapted from, the novel Shoeless Joe, authored by W. P. Kinsella. In their conversation, Todd Lockwood thanked W. P. Kinsella's work for inspiring him to take action in building the Library. To which W. P. Kinsella responded by attributing his having written Shoeless Joe and having become a writer, to the works of Richard Brautigan, the author of The Abortion: An Historical Romance 1966 on which the real life Brautigan Library concept is derived. It is also mentioned in this report that Richard Brautigan died on September 16, 1984, and W. P. Kinsella died on September 16, 2016, both by choice.
