= All Watched Over by Machines of Loving Grace (poetry collection) =

Book by Richard Brautigan

- First edition
- Author: Richard Brautigan
- Cover artist: Bill Brock
- Language: English
- Genre: Poetry
- Publisher: Communication Company
- Publication date: 1967
- Publication place: United States
- Media type: Print (Softcover)
- Preceded by: The Octopus Frontier
- Followed by: Please Plant This Book

All Watched Over by Machines of Loving Grace is Richard Brautigan's fifth poetry publication. Like several of his early works, the entire edition (of 1,500 copies) was distributed for free. The title poem envisions a world where cybernetics has advanced to a stage where it allows a return to the balance of nature and an elimination of the need for human labor. All thirty-two of the poems in this collection were republished in The Pill Versus the Springhill Mine Disaster.

== Copyleft statement ==
In the original 1967 publication, Brautigan included a copyleft statement which retains copyright but grants permission to reprint any poem in All Watched Over by Machines of Loving Grace on one condition:

© Copyright 1967 by Richard Brautigan

Permission is granted to reprint
any of these poems in magazines,
books and newspapers if they are
given away free. 

== Cultural references ==
The title was later used by Tucson, Arizona industrial rock band Machines of Loving Grace, formed in 1989, and in its full form by British musician Martin Carr as the title of a 2004 album, by the musician Martha Tilston for the title of her album "Machines Of Love And Grace", as well as a 2011 television series by documentary maker Adam Curtis. Machines of Loving Grace is also the title of a 2015 nonfiction book by John Markoff, documenting robotics transforming society. Dario Amodei, an AI leader and CEO of Anthropic, published a popular essay entitled “Machines of a Loving Grace” about an optimistic role than AI can play on human societies.
