= The Return of the Rivers =

- First edition
- Author: Richard Brautigan
- Language: English
- Genre: Poetry
- Publisher: Inferno Press
- Publication date: 1957

The Return of the Rivers is the first work of poetry released by American writer Richard Brautigan. It was first published in 1957 by Inferno Press. Several of Brautigan's poems had been published as early as 1952, when "The Light" appeared in the Eugene High School News, but The Return of the Rivers was the first formally published on its own. It is a single two-part poem printed on a broadside, wrapped in construction paper, and fitted with a label that had the name of the printer and Brautigan's signature. It was reprinted in the Berkeley Review, also in 1957, and was included in Brautigan's best known collection, The Pill Versus the Springhill Mine Disaster. Caroline Bokinsky called the poem "an observation of the external world as a surreal, romanticized setting in which the cycle of life is exemplified in the river, sea, rain, and ocean."
