= In Watermelon Sugar =

Novel by Richard Brautigan

- First edition cover, showing Brautigan with his muse Hilda Hoffmann.
- Author: Richard Brautigan
- Cover artist: Edmund Shea
- Language: English
- Genre: Post-apocalyptic novel; postmodern novel
- Publisher: Four Seasons Foundation
- Publication date: June 14, 1968
- Publication place: United States
- Media type: Print (Hardback & Paperback)
- Pages: 138
- ISBN: 1-131-52372-5
- Preceded by: Trout Fishing in America (1967)
- Followed by: Revenge of the Lawn (1971)

In Watermelon Sugar is an American postmodern post-apocalyptic novel by Richard Brautigan written in 1964 and published in 1968.

Set in the aftermath of a fallen civilization, it focuses on a commune organized around a central gathering house which is named "iDEATH". In this environment, many things are made of watermelon sugar (though the inhabitants also use pine wood and stone for building material and fuel made from trout oil). The landscape of the novel is constantly in flux; each day of the week has a different-colored sun which creates different-colored watermelons, and the central building also changes frequently. The novel's narrator, who is left unnamed, claims to be writing an investigative book on his experiences at iDEATH. Its first-person narrative is sparse and minimalist, granting the novel a detached and alien quality.

== Plot ==
A nameless narrator lives a gentle life in a communal settlement called iDEATH, a place where everything is constructed from pine wood, stone, and the sweet substance of watermelon sugar. The sun changes color each day, cycling throughout the week, and the world is filled with rivers, piney woods, and statues commemorating the past. The narrator is writing a book, the twenty-fourth in 171 years, and has recently left his long-time girlfriend, Margaret, for a woman named Pauline, causing tension in their small community.

The story unfolds through the narrator's daily rituals: walks at night, meals at iDEATH, working on his book, and visiting the Watermelon Works. On night walks he often sees an unknown girl with a lantern in the distance. A deep shadow is cast by the memory of the tigers, beautiful, articulate creatures that once killed and ate the narrator's parents but also helped him with his arithmetic before they were hunted to extinction. The last tiger was burned on a pyre, and the trout hatchery at iDEATH was built over the ashes.

The central conflict arises from the life and death of inBOIL, the brother of the community's leader, Charley. Disillusioned with iDEATH, and feeling it was a mistake to kill off the tigers, inBOIL forms a drunken gang that lives in shacks near the edge of the mysterious and endless Forgotten Works, a wasteland of discarded and incomprehensible objects from a previous world. They make whiskey from forgotten things, and their behavior becomes increasingly erratic. Margaret is strangely drawn to the Forgotten Works and spends time with inBOIL's gang, collecting artifacts, which creates a rift with the narrator.

The crisis culminates when inBOIL and his men, in a drunken delirium, storm iDEATH to reveal its "true" meaning. Inside the trout hatchery, they declare the dead tigers were the real essence of iDEATH and proceed to ritually mutilate and kill themselves with jackknives, cutting off their thumbs, noses, and ears before bleeding to death. Pauline defiantly mops up their blood, and the bodies are taken back to the Forgotten Works and burned along with their shacks.

In the aftermath, Margaret is ostracized because of her rumored, though unproven, involvement with inBOIL. While looking into the Statue of Mirrors, a reflective surface that shows distant events, the narrator witnesses her suicide. He watches as she hangs herself from an apple tree with a blue scarf. Her body is retrieved, and her room at iDEATH, filled with things from the Forgotten Works, is bricked up forever with silent, black sugar bricks. The story concludes on a black, soundless day with Margaret's funeral. Her body, adorned in robes of glowing foxfire, is placed in a glass tomb at the bottom of a river. The community then prepares for a customary funeral dance, waiting in silence for sound to return to the world so the waltzing can begin. In a final quiet revelation, the narrator notes that Pauline, now sleeping peacefully beside him, was once the mysterious girl with the lantern he always watched on his long night walks.

== Interpretations ==
The concept of iDEATH is subject to various interpretations. It can be seen as a new Eden in a post-apocalyptic world, with the old destroyed world represented by the Forgotten Works, connecting the narrator and his new lover to Adam and Eve. The novel alludes to communal experiments of the 1960s, involving the intersection of nature and technology. For example, the iDEATH building seems to have been constructed around nature, rather than displacing it; the building houses many trees, rocks, a creek, and a trout hatchery. Brautigan himself said he based the book on his life in Bolinas, whose inhabitants were at that time known for their semi-communal and insular ways.

In a 1992 assessment of the novel, literary critic Patrick Morrow wrote: "It is possible to give an ironic reading to In Watermelon Sugar, but this would entail a psychological interpretation of the fable, and fables are traditionally black and white — issue-directed, not motivation- and character-directed." The novel is considered a work of postmodern fiction. Literary critic Carolyn Kelly commented on the novel's setting, writing:

Indeed, the perfected world of this novel does not work. Brautigan's silence speaks loudly as he presents what seems to be a parody of the pastoral. This society may represent what modern man might wish it to be—an answer to or a substitute for the mechanistic, profit-seeking, inhumane world of social and moral decadence in which he finds himself, but the distortion in the new society is also obvious and just as unattractive. Viewing this book, then, as a parody of the pastoral, one might consider the ideas that are implied by the silence and attempt to determine what Brautigan's attitude is toward this "perfect" society.

== Allusions in other works ==
In Watermelon Sugar is referenced in Ray Mungo's book on his experiences founding and running the Total Loss Farm commune in Vermont. He speaks of iDEATH several times. Stephen Gaskin, who wrote that he felt an "acid weird" and "strange mythology" in the book, may have based some aspects of The Farm commune in Summertown, Tennessee on iDEATH.

The titles and characters are also used as lyrics in a song by new rave band Klaxons in their song "Forgotten Works", that features on their album Myths of the Near Future.

Neko Case references this book as the inspiration for her song "Margaret versus Pauline" on the album Fox Confessor Brings the Flood.

The setting of the novel is also referenced in the song "The Tigers" by the band Goodbye Kumiko. iDEATH is also briefly referenced in the "New Traveler's Almanac" section of The League of Extraordinary Gentlemen Volume 2.

In Watermelon Sugar is also referenced multiple times in the Dean Koontz novel, One Door Away from Heaven, by an important secondary character who believes, in her near-constant drug-soaked haze, that she would unlock the secrets of the universe if she could only understand this book properly.

The main character of the 1998 Wally Lamb novel I Know This Much Is True reads and references In Watermelon Sugar throughout the novel.

In the final chapter of Jonathan Lethem's novel Fortress of Solitude, the narrator learns that his mother lived at a commune called Watermelon Sugar Farm.

Harry Styles shared, during a February 2020 Tiny Desk Concert, that a copy of the book inspired the title of his song "Watermelon Sugar".
