= Clark County Historical Museum =

- Vancouver Public Library
- U.S. National Register of Historic Places
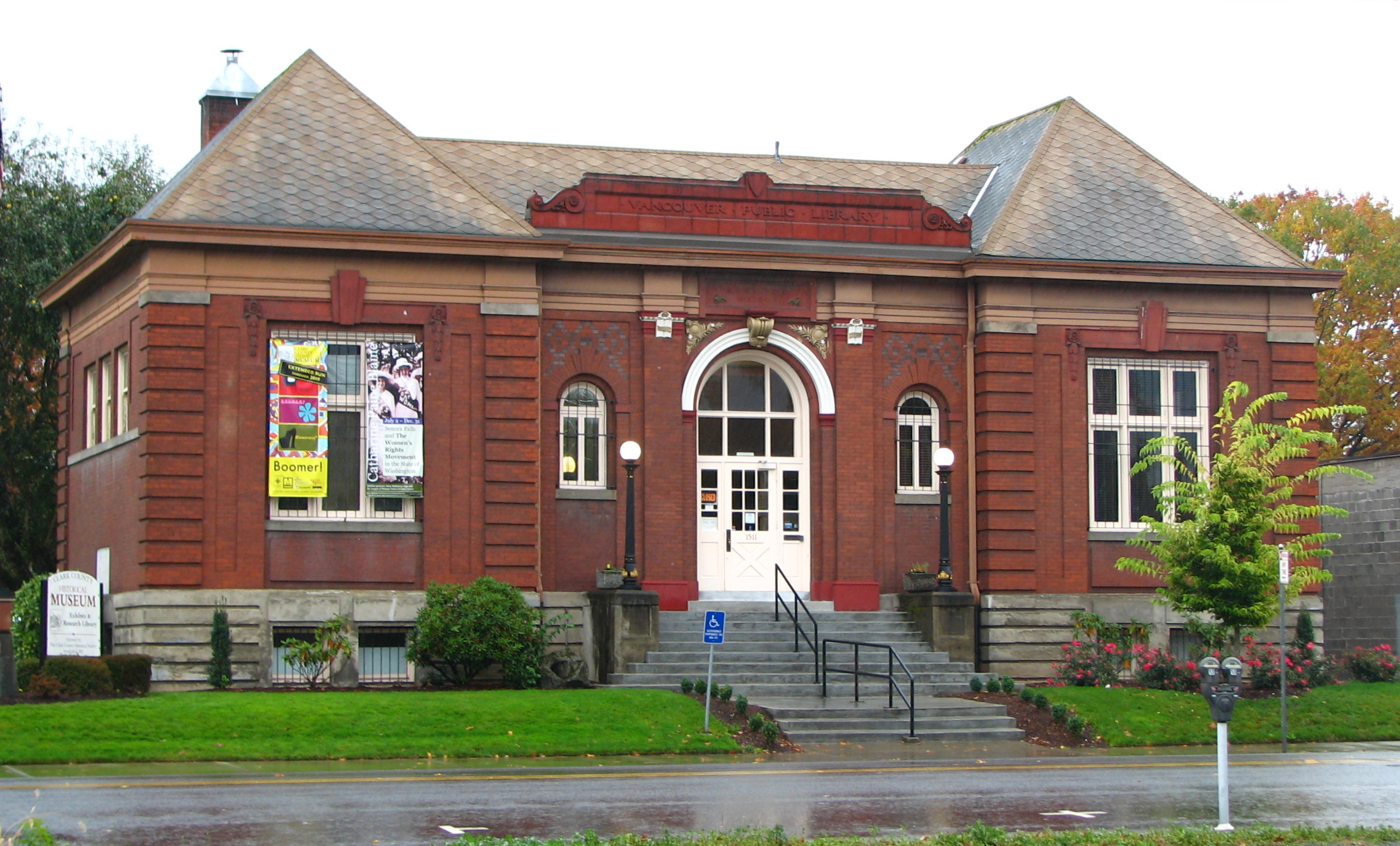

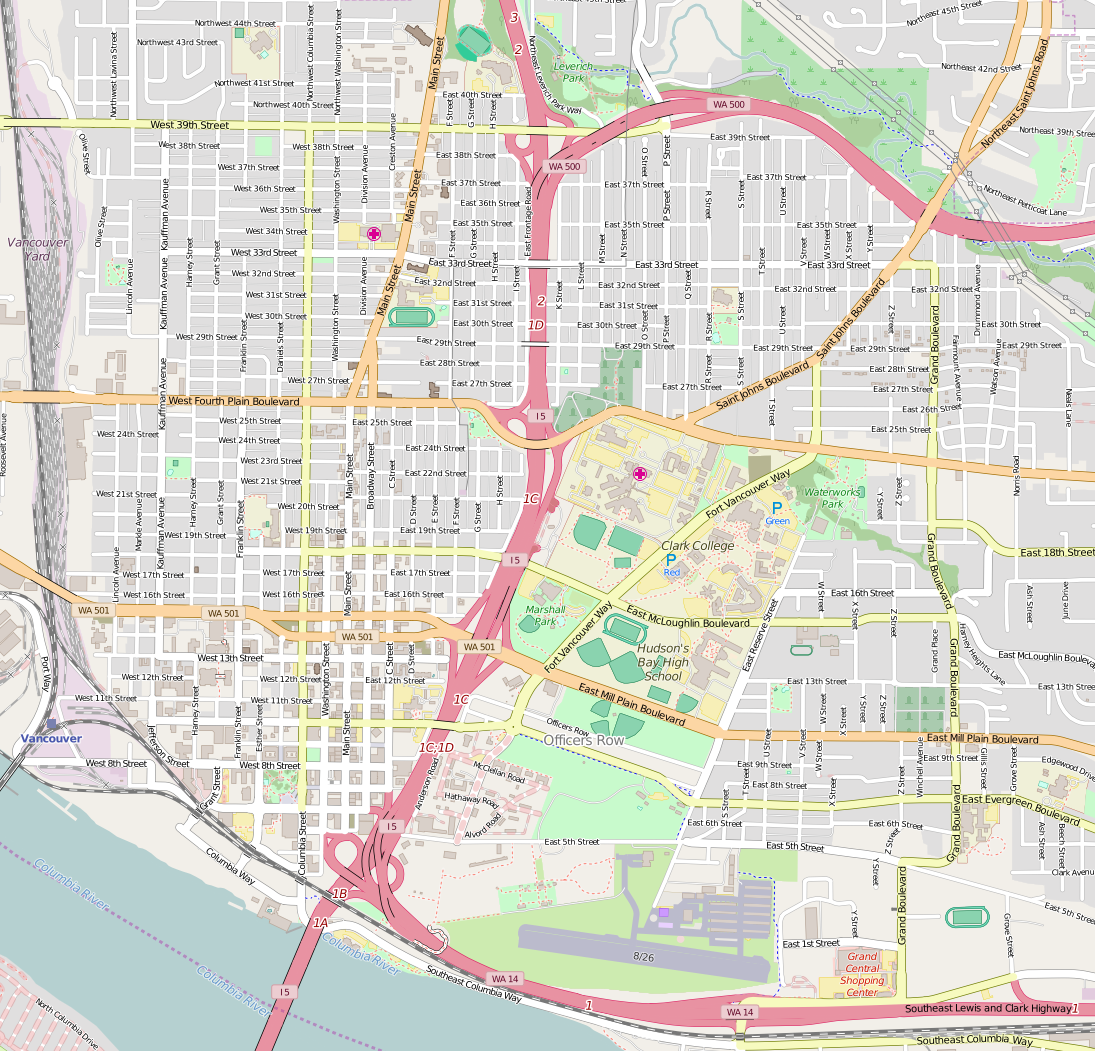
- Location within Vancouver Washington
- Location: 1511 Main St., Vancouver, Washington
- Coordinates: 45°38′0″N 122°40′12″W
- Area: less than one acre
- Built: 1909
- Architect: Nichols, Dennis; Kaufman, William
- MPS: Carnegie Libraries of Washington TR
- NRHP reference No.: 82004204
- Added to NRHP: August 3, 1982

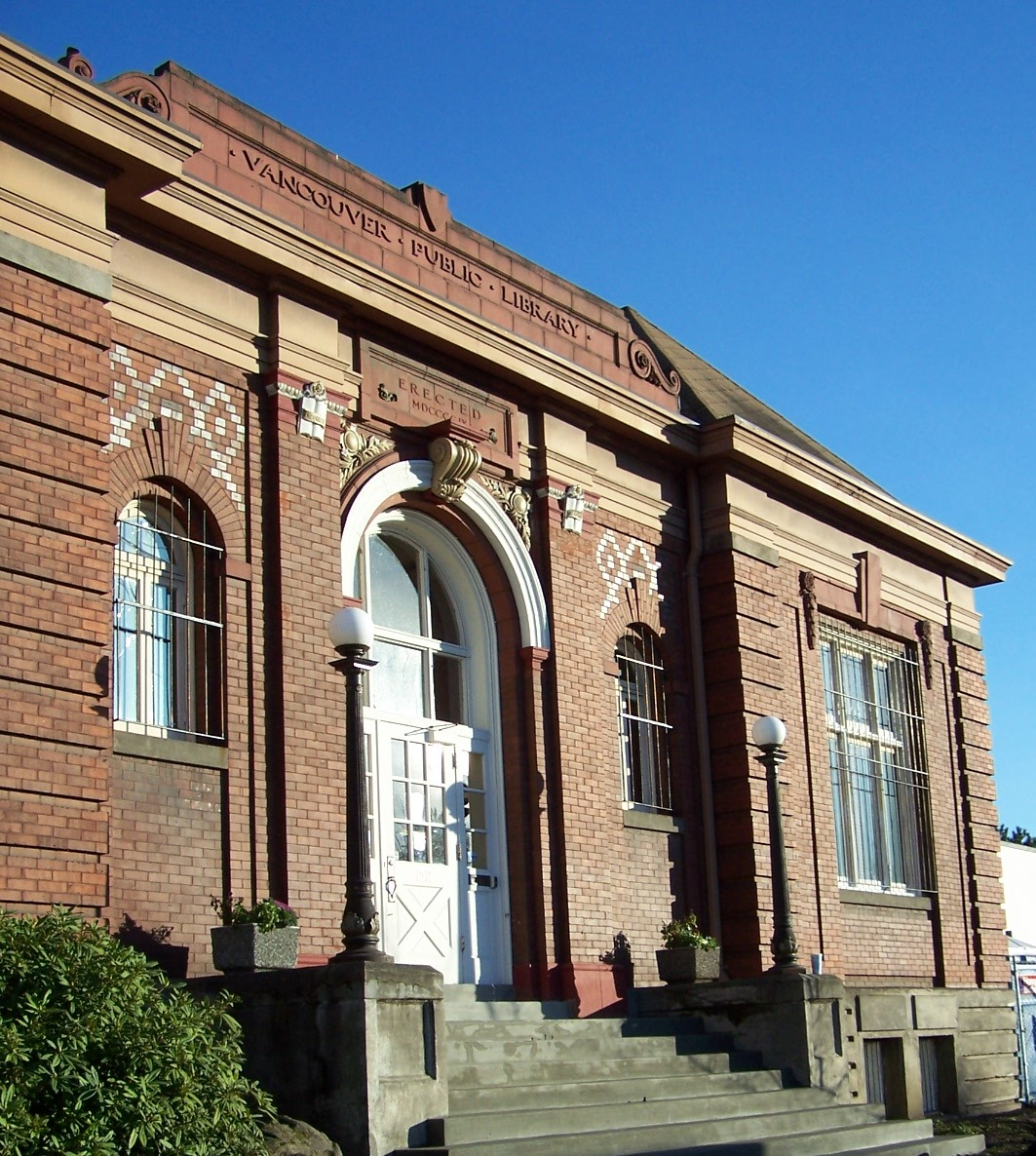
The Clark County Historical Museum has been located in the 1909 Carnegie library of Vancouver, WA since May 24, 1964.

The Clark County Historical Museum, Vancouver, Washington, is located in a 1909 Carnegie library and is operated by the Clark County Historical Society, established in 1917. It opened at the old Carnegie Library building on May 24, 1964. The first museum director was Joe Pagel.

The museum features rotating exhibits of local interest including a semi-permanent Native American craft exhibit. The Society is dedicated to the collection, preservation, and interpretation of the cultural history of Clark County and the Pacific Northwest, and to sponsoring educational programs and exhibits for the enrichment of all members of the public.

The Clark County Historical Museum is a 501(C)3 non-profit organization. The Clark County Historical Society operates the Museum in partnership with Clark County and the City of Vancouver. Additional funding helps sustain the operation of the museum and comes in many forms including: Clark County Historical Society membership dues, private and foundation grants, corporate sponsorships, in-kind gifts, and donations.

== Programs and annual events ==
The museum was responsible for the establishment of the Carnegie Library Consortium of Washington and in 2009 launched "Mr. Carnegie's Grand Tour of Washington," a free, annual automobile-based travel program exploring Washington's historic Carnegie libraries and nearby heritage sites.

Since 2004, the museum has hosted Harvest Fun Day, an annual community event featuring scarecrow making, pumpkin painting, pie-eating, and corn-shucking contests, as well as antique farm equipment demonstrations and live music. The event is held on the fourth Saturday of September and since 2010 has been held at the 78th Street Heritage Farm in Hazel Dell (also Clark County's former Poor Farm).

Holiday Open House is a free-admission, annual holiday event when local artisans showcase their wares on the first Saturday of December.

The museum is open from 5 to 9 p.m. every first Thursday of the month from February through November for First Thursday Museum After Hours. Rotating guest lecturers speak at 7 p.m. on a variety of pertinent topics.

The museum also partners with local schools on educational projects, such as the Artifact Detectives kits used from 2009 to 2012 in several Clark County schools.

In 2010, the museum became the home of The Brautigan Library, a permanent collection of unpublished manuscripts inspired by author and poet Richard Brautigan's 1971 book The Abortion: An Historical Romance 1966 and submitted by people from around the world in the early 1990s.
