= June 30th, June 30th =

1978 poetry collection by Richard Brautigan

- Author: Richard Brautigan
- Language: English
- Genre: Poetry
- Publisher: Delacorte Press
- Publication date: 1978
- Pages: 99
- ISBN: 0-385-28495-0

June 30th, June 30th is a poetry collection published in 1978 by American writer Richard Brautigan. It was his eighth book of poetry and the last released in his lifetime. It contains 77 poems that Brautigan wrote in 1976 during his seven-week stay in Japan, presented in a diary-like format. The title is the date he planned to leave the country.

In the introduction, Brautigan explains his complicated relationship with Japan. He was initially interested because of his uncle, who died as a result of Japanese bombing of Midway in World War II. In the years following the war, the anger he carried faded and he began to learn about and appreciate Japanese art and culture, which helped him to better understand the war, and led him to feel compelled to visit.

== Analysis ==
The book is an example of haibun, a Japanese literary form in which a group of poems form a larger narrative. Caroline Bokinsky notes that here, unlike others in Brautigan's oeuvre, he is a "confessional poet, lost and alone in a strange land, unable to communicate."

Many reviewers commented on a pervasive feeling of loneliness running throughout the text. Kirkus Reviews described Brautigan's apparent mood while writing as "lonely, moony, lost, self-sorry, in love", and Dennis Petticoffer said the work as a whole "portrays a mood of alienation and loneliness." Choice also commented that the author seemed lonely, "not surprisingly, since Brautigan knows no Japanese", and its "advance nostalgia contributed by the fact of a known departure date".

== Reception ==
June 30th, June 30th received mixed to negative reviews. Brautigan acknowledges in the introduction that the "quality of [the poems] is uneven but I have printed them all anyway because they are a diary expressing my feelings and emotions in Japan and the quality of life is often uneven." The Kirkus reviewer called some poems "dreadful" but "every once in a while a testament to the variety and flexibility of poetry that's very refreshing." Choice called it "in summary, an often good book" that would benefit from editing. Carrie Knowles of The Booklist found it to be "a case of terminal poetic pretentiousness" in which Brautigan's introspection causes him to do Japan a disservice, whereas Arian Schuster found Japan to serve only as a metaphor for alienation. Publishers Weekly said the "haphazard" book will cause fans to "wince and wonder at this decline in Brautigan's talent".
