= Please Plant This Book =

Poetry by Richard Brautigan

- Author: Richard Brautigan
- Cover artist: Bill Brock
- Language: English
- Genre: Poetry
- Publisher: Richard Brautigan
- Publication date: 1968
- Publication place: United States
- Media type: Print (Softcover)
- Preceded by: All Watched Over by Machines of Loving Grace
- Followed by: The Pill Versus the Springhill Mine Disaster

Please Plant This Book is the sixth volume of poetry published by American writer Richard Brautigan.

The collection consists of a glued folder containing eight seed packets, with a poem printed on the front of each. The book was Brautigan's last self-publishing venture. The edition had a run of 6,000 free copies.

The eight poem titles and associated seed packets are as follows:

- California Native Flowers
- Calendula
- Carrots
- Lettuce
- Sweet Alyssum Royal Carpet
- Squash
- Shasta Daisy
- Parsley

Please Plant This Book employs many practices inspired by the countercultural group in San Francisco in the 1960s drawing on the ideology of the Diggers.

Brautigan's format and distribution methods reflected a rejection of standard copyright practices. The book includes the statement: "THIS BOOK IS FREE. // Permission is granted to reprint this book by anyone as long as it is not sold." Scholar Chelsea Jennings writes, "[s]purning copyright allowed poets to encourage faster and wider circulation of their work, but it also represented an intervention into property-based constructions of individual authorship." Brautigan's project is in conversation with other written artwork distributed freely by the poet Diane Di Prima in periodicals such as Off Our Backs by examining the varying, interconnected meanings of 'free'. Jennings further observes that this work, through its explicit renouncement of copyright and its focus on sharing literal seeds, "reframed authorship in terms of creation and circulation rather than sale."

Psychedelic band Mad River, to whom Brautigan was an early benefactor, returned the favor by giving Brautigan some of their Capitol Record advance money to help publish and distribute Please Plant This Book.

== Dinefwr Literature Festival ==
This project was re-created for the Dinefwr Literature Festival, which took place in June 2012 in West Wales. The start of the festival was celebrated through events inspired by the author. In addition to reprinting the poetry folders, the public was taken on a walk through the grounds where a pomegranate tree, nicknamed "the Brautigan pomegranate", was planted. Ianthe Brautigan, Brautigan's daughter, flew in from San Francisco to join in the celebrations.

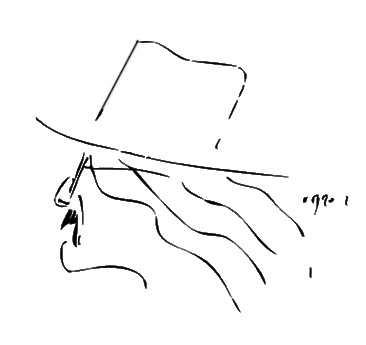
Richard Brautigan
