= The Galilee Hitch-Hiker =

- First edition
- Author: Richard Brautigan
- Cover artist: Kenn Davis
- Language: English
- Genre: Poetry
- Publisher: White Rabbit Press
- Publication date: 1958
- Publication place: United States
- Media type: Print (Softcover)
- Pages: 16
- Followed by: Lay The Marble Tea

The Galilee Hitch-Hiker is Richard Brautigan's second poetry publication. It was first published in 1958 by White Rabbit Press in a hand-sewn edition of 200, and was sold by a variety of means, including City Lights Bookstore and direct sales by Brautigan to those passing by on the street.

In 1966 the book was re-released by The Cranium Press in a run of 700 with an additional 16 signed and numbered copies. Brautigan signed each of the 16 copies in blue pencil and drew a small picture of a fish.

The contents consist of one poem with nine separately titled sections. It was reprinted, in its entirety, in The Pill Versus the Springhill Mine Disaster.
