= A Confederate General from Big Sur =

1965 novel by Richard Brautigan

A Confederate General From Big Sur
- First edition cover
- Author: Richard Brautigan
- Cover artist: Larry Rivers
- Language: English
- Published: January 22, 1965
- Publisher: Grove Press
- Publication place: United States
- Media type: Print (hardback & paperback)
- Pages: 159
- ISBN: 0-224-61923-3
- OCLC: 173964
- Followed by: Trout Fishing in America

A Confederate General from Big Sur is Richard Brautigan's first published novel, published in 1965.

The story takes place in 1957. A man named Lee Mellon believes he is a descendant of a Confederate general who was originally from Big Sur, California. This general is not in any books or records and there is no proof of his existence, although Mellon meets a drifter from the Pacific Northwest who has also heard of this general. Mellon seeks the truth of his own modern-day war against the status quo of the modern United States in light of the Confederacy's past struggle with the Union. The novel's overall theme is the struggle of the human mind's perceptions and beliefs versus reality.

Brautigan completed the novel in 1961 but it was not published until January 22, 1965. The novel sold poorly and soon went out of print but was later republished when Brautigan developed something of a cult following, largely based on his reputation developed in response to his next major work, the novella Trout Fishing in America.
