= Sombrero Fallout: A Japanese Novel =

1976 novel by Richard Brautigan

- First edition
- Author: Richard Brautigan
- Cover artist: John Ansado
- Language: English
- Publisher: Simon & Schuster
- Publication date: 1976
- Publication place: United States
- Media type: Print (Hardback & Paperback)
- Pages: 187
- ISBN: 0-671-22331-3
- OCLC: 2213273
- Dewey Decimal: 813/.5/4
- LC Class: PZ4.B826 So PS3503.R2736

Sombrero Fallout: A Japanese Novel is Richard Brautigan's seventh novel, completed in 1975 it was published the following year.

Sombrero Fallout is a novel which follows two stories. The first revolves around a humorist in San Francisco in 1972 trying to cope with the recent loss of his Japanese lover, which includes various dreams the ex-lover is having. During a particular fit, the author becomes dissatisfied with a story he had just begun about a sombrero falling from the sky. This story eventually takes on a life of its own, including a heroic cameo appearance by Norman Mailer.

== Publication history ==
- 1976, US, Simon & Schuster, ISBN 0-671-22331-3, Pub date Sep 1976, Hardback
- 1977, UK, Jonathan Cape, ISBN 0-224-01371-8, Pub date Mar 1977, Hardback
- 1978, US, Simon & Schuster, ISBN 0-671-23025-5, Paperback
- 1978, UK, Macmillan, ISBN 0-330-25548-7, Pub date Nov 1978, Paperback
- 1987, UK, Arena/Arrow, ISBN 0-09-939110-4, Pub date 02 Apr 1987, Paperback
- 1998, UK, Rebel Inc, ISBN 0-86241-801-1, Pub date May 1998, Paperback
- 2001, UK, Rebel Inc, ISBN 1-84195-137-4, Pub date 02 Jun 2001
- 2012, UK, Canongate, ISBN 0-85786-264-2, Paperback

The 2012 Canongate edition includes an introduction by Jarvis Cocker who chose the book to accompany him on BBC Radio 4's Desert Island Discs in 2005.
