= Loading Mercury with a Pitchfork =

Book by Richard Brautigan

- First edition
- Author: Richard Brautigan
- Cover artist: Erik Weber
- Language: English
- Genre: Poetry
- Publisher: Simon & Schuster
- Publication date: 1976
- Publication place: United States
- Media type: Print (Hardcover)
- Pages: 127
- ISBN: 0-671-22263-5
- OCLC: 2006053
- Dewey Decimal: 811/.5/4
- LC Class: PS3503.R2736 L6

Loading Mercury with a Pitchfork is Richard Brautigan's ninth poetry publication. Published in 1976, the book includes 127 poems. The four line title poem discusses the effort and interest in undertaking an obviously impossible task, such as loading the liquid metal Mercury using only a pitchfork.

Loading mercury with a pitchfork
your truck is almost full. The neighbors
take a certain pride in you. They
stand around watching.
"Loading Mercury with a Pitchfork" (1971)
