= Lay the Marble Tea =

1959 poetry collection by Richard Brautigan

- Author: Richard Brautigan
- Language: English
- Genre: Poetry
- Publisher: Carp Press
- Publication date: 1959
- Pages: 16

Lay the Marble Tea is a 1959 poetry collection by American writer Richard Brautigan. It is Brautigan's first collection and third poetry publication.

It was published by Carp Press, the name of the self-publishing project of Brautigan and his wife, Virginia Dionne Alder. Alder was heavily involved in the production process. The couple printed 500 copies at a local printshop for just under $100.

The cover is a drawing by Kenn Davis of a man and women having tea while sitting on gravestones. The man is holding onto a tree, which Davis says was pointedly phallic because "Richard was always looking for something to kind of gently throw in the public's face." The woman in the drawing is intended to be Emily Dickinson—it was from one of her poems, and included by Brautigan as an epigraph, that the book's title was taken:

The grave my little cottage is,
Where, keeping house for thee,
I make my parlor orderly,
And lay the marble tea"

The book is 16 pages long, with 24 poems. Nine of the poems were reprinted in the 1968 collection The Pill versus the Springhill Mine Disaster, one of Brautigan's best known works.

Several critics noted how Lay the Marble Tea differs from most of Brautigan's other work. According to John F. Barber, unlike his later work, Lay the Marble Tea uses several different narrators rather than a single first-person perspective. Hjortsberg observes that "the poetry is in a cyclical framework [with the first] being mentioned in the last". It is also more experimental with language than work he had produced until then, with use of humorous wordplay, analogy and metaphor.
