= Willard and His Bowling Trophies =

Book by Richard Brautigan

Willard and His Bowling Trophies: A Perverse Mystery
- First edition
- Author: Richard Brautigan
- Language: English
- Publisher: Simon & Schuster
- Publication date: September 13, 1975
- Publication place: United States
- Media type: Print (Hardback & Paperback)
- Pages: 167
- ISBN: 0-671-22065-9
- OCLC: 1230779
- Dewey Decimal: 813/.5/4
- LC Class: PZ4.B826 Wi PS3503.R2736

Willard and His Bowling Trophies: A Perverse Mystery is a novel by Richard Brautigan written in 1975.

The story takes place in San Francisco, California in the early 1970s. The title character is a papier-mâché bird that shares the front room of a San Francisco apartment with a collection of bowling trophies that some time earlier were stolen from the home of the Logan brothers. The human tenants of this apartment are John and Pat, who have just returned from seeing a Greta Garbo movie in a local movie theater. Their neighbors are Bob and Constance, a married couple going through some rough times in their relationship. Because of their failing relationship, Bob becomes depressed. Meanwhile, the Logan brothers are looking for their bowling trophies stolen three years earlier. The brothers have turned their happy life of bowling into a life of vengeance. Brautigan tried to have all the main characters in the story have an intersection that is comically sad.

Richard Brautigan got the name Willard in the novel from his friend Stanley Fullerton's papier-mâché bird named Willard and, in fact, a bird is on the front cover of the novel.

In 2018, filmmaker Kansas Bowling and musician Kat Meoz shot the only existing footage of the real Willard for a music video for Meoz's song "Here I Wait".
