= So the Wind Won't Blow It All Away =

1982 novel by Richard Brautigan

So The Wind Won't Blow It All Away
- First edition
- Author: Richard Brautigan
- Cover artist: Roger Ressmeyer
- Language: English
- Publisher: Delacorte Press/ Seymour Lawrence
- Publication date: 1982
- Publication place: United States
- Media type: Print (hardback & paperback)
- Pages: 131
- ISBN: 0-440-08195-5
- OCLC: 8306300
- Dewey Decimal: 813/.54 19
- LC Class: PS3503.R2736 S58 1982

So the Wind Won't Blow It All Away is a novel written by Richard Brautigan, published in 1982.

The story is about a narrator in 1979 remembering the events that happened when he was 13 in 1948. The young narrator lives in a lower class suburban Oregon neighborhood and collects beer bottles or does favors for neighbors to earn money. He also spends time alone fishing in a pond on the outskirts of town.

A nonlinear narrative, the book begins with the narrator buying bullets from a gunshop across the street instead of buying a hamburger at a local diner. The novel hovers and builds around this event until the end. While shooting rotten apples at an abandoned orchard with a friend, the narrator accidentally shoots the friend and kills him. Because the shooting was an accident he is acquitted, but the incident ruins the reputation of him and his family. His waitress mother doesn't get tips anymore, he is severely bullied at school, and they are forced to move to another town where the event is not known. The book ends with a return to an observation of two obese people fishing in a temporarily set up "living room" by the pond. Most of the book is made up of observations of the different strange characters that surrounded the narrator when he was a child.

The novel presents a wistful, poetic and many times sad perspective on a life, some of it being on Brautigan's own. The tone can be described as being saturated with feeling and sublime in its bittersweetness – demonstrated in this quote from the end of the novel:

"I had become so quiet and so small in the grass by the pond that I was barely noticeable, hardly there… I sat there watching their living room shining out of the dark beside the pond. It looked like a fairy-tale functioning happily in the post-World War II gothic of America before television crippled the imagination and turned people indoors and away from living out their own fantasies with dignity… Anyway, I just kept getting smaller and smaller beside the pond, more and more unnoticed in the darkening summer grass until I disappeared into the 32 years that have passed since then…"

Each chapter of the novel begins with the words "so the wind won't blow it all away...Dust...American...Dust".

According to the Brautigan archival website, this is a semi-autobiographical novel based on two separate incidents which took place in and around Eugene, Oregon, in Brautigan's early teens. Brautigan had shot and slightly injured a friend during a duck hunt in Fern Ridge. At around the same time, the 14-year-old son of a well-known attorney in the Eugene area was shot and killed, also in a hunting accident. Some of the events in the novel are mentioned in Brautigan's biography You Can't Catch Death written by his daughter Ianthe Elizabeth Brautigan.

== Film adaptation ==
A thirty-minute film based on this novel was produced by Swensen Productions (Ianthe Brautigan and husband Paul Swensen) and shown at the New York Film Festival in June 2000 and the Los Angeles Film Festival in October 2000. The screenplay was written by Robert Duxbury.
