= Ianthe Elizabeth Brautigan =

American writer (born 1960)

Ianthe Elizabeth Brautigan, also known as Ianthe Brautigan-Swensen (born 25 March 1960), is an American writer and educator, who lives and works in Sonoma County, California.

Her memoir, You Can't Catch Death: A Daughter's Memoir, published in 2000, explores her early life with her father, author Richard Brautigan, and the legacy of his suicide when she was 24.

== Biography ==
She was born in San Francisco, California to Richard Brautigan and Virginia Dionne Alder. Her parents separated when she was two and she spent most of her young life with her father. They lived much of the time in Montana, where he often saw his friends Thomas McGuane and Michael McClure, who were members of the Beat Generation. Brautigan and her father also traveled to Hawaii and Japan.

In You Can't Catch Death: A Daughter's Memoir, Brautigan writes about her father and the effect his suicide had on her own life. She was nine years old when he first told her that he wanted to kill himself; she was 24 years old when he did so. The book is written in a style similar to her father's work, with short chapters and an impressionistic style. She writes mostly about her early life with her father and his friends.

Brautigan married film director Paul Swensen on September 5, 1981. They have a daughter named Elizabeth. The family lives in Sonoma County, California. Brautigan teaches English and Creative Writing at Santa Rosa Junior College and Sonoma State University (SSU).

== Works ==
You Can't Catch Death: A Daughter's Memoir (2000; ISBN 0-312-26418-6)
