= Revenge of the Lawn =

Book by Richard Brautigan

- First edition
- Author: Richard Brautigan
- Cover artist: Edmund Shea
- Language: English
- Genre: Short stories
- Publisher: Simon & Schuster
- Publication date: October 1, 1971
- Publication place: United States
- Media type: Print (hardback & paperback)
- Pages: 174
- ISBN: 0-671-20960-4
- OCLC: 199967
- Dewey Decimal: 813/.5/4
- LC Class: PZ4.B826 Re PS3503.R2736

Revenge of the Lawn: Stories 1962-1970 is a collection of 62 short stories written by the American author Richard Brautigan from 1962 to 1970. Like most of Brautigan's works, the stories are whimsical, simply themed, and often surreal. Many of the stories were originally published elsewhere. The book also contains two missing chapters from his work Trout Fishing in America, "Rembrandt Creek" and "Carthage Sink".

== Contents ==
- "Revenge of the Lawn"
- "1692 Cotton Mather Newsreel"
- "1/3, 1/3, 1/3"
- "The Gathering of a Californian"
- "A Short Story About Contemporary Life in California"
- "Pacific Radio Fire"
- "Elmira"
- "Coffee"
- The Lost Chapters of Trout Fishing in America: "Rembrandt Creek" and "Carthage Sink"
- "The Weather in San Francisco"
- "Complicated Banking Problems"
- "A High Building in Singapore"
- "An Unlimited Supply of 35 Millimetre Film"
- "The Scarlatti Tilt"
- "The Wild Birds of Heaven"
- "Winter Rug"
- "Ernest Hemingway's Typist"
- "Homage to the San Francisco YMCA"
- "The Pretty Office"
- "A Need for Gardens"
- "The Old Bus"
- "The Ghost Children of Tacoma"
- "Talk Show"
- "I Was Trying to Describe You to Someone"
- "Trick or Treating Down to the Sea in Ships"
- "Blackberry Motorist"
- "Thoreau Rubber Band"
- "44:00"
- "Perfect California Day"
- "The Post Offices of Eastern Oregon"
- "Pale Marble Movie"
- "Partners"
- "Getting to Know Each Other"
- "A Short History of Oregon"
- "A Long Time Ago People Decided to Live in America"
- "A Short History of Religion in California"
- "April in God-damn"
- "One Afternoon in 1939"
- "Corporal"
- "Lint"
- "A Complete History of Germany and Japan"
- "The Auction"
- "The Armoured Car"
- "The Literary Life in California/1964"
- "Banners of My Own Choosing"
- "Fame in California/1964"
- "Memory of a Girl"
- "September California"
- "A Study of California Flowers"
- "The Betrayed Kingdom"
- "Women When They Put Their Clothes On in the Morning"
- "Hallowe'en in Denver"
- "Atlantisburg"
- "A View from the Dog Tower"
- "Greyhound Tragedy"
- "Crazy Old Women are Riding the Buses of America Today"
- "The Correct Time"
- "Holiday in Germany"
- "Sand Castles"
- "Forgiven"
- "American Flag Decal"
- "World War I Los Angeles Aeroplane"
