= Trout Fishing in America =

1967 novella by Richard Brautigan

- Cover of the first edition
- Author: Richard Brautigan
- Cover artist: Erik Weber
- Language: English
- Genre: Novella, Prose poem
- Publisher: Four Seasons Foundation
- Publication date: October 12, 1967
- Publication place: United States
- Media type: Paperback
- Pages: 112
- ISBN: 0-395-50076-1
- OCLC: 232945520
- Preceded by: A Confederate General from Big Sur
- Followed by: In Watermelon Sugar

Trout Fishing in America (1967) is a novella written by Richard Brautigan. It consists of short pieces linked by recurring characters.

Technically it is Brautigan's first novel, as he completed it in 1961, but his book A Confederate General from Big Sur was published first.

== Overview ==
Trout Fishing In America is an abstract book without a clear central storyline. Instead, the book contains a series of anecdotes broken into chapters, with the same characters often reappearing from story to story. The settings of most of the chapters occur in three locales: Brautigan's childhood in the Pacific Northwest of the U.S.; his day-to-day adult life in San Francisco; and a camping trip in Idaho with his wife and infant daughter during the summer of 1961. Most of the chapters were written during this trip. An excerpt appeared as the lead piece in the Evergreen Review, Volume 7, No. 31 (Oct.–Nov. 1963).

The phrase "Trout Fishing in America" is used in various ways: it is the title of the book, a character, a hotel, the act of fishing itself, a modifier (one character is named "Trout Fishing in America Shorty") and other things. Brautigan uses the theme of trout fishing as a point of departure for thinly veiled and often comical critiques of mainstream American society and culture. Several symbolic objects, such as a mayonnaise jar, a Ben Franklin statue in San Francisco's Washington Square and trout, reappear throughout the book.

The cover of the book is a photograph of Brautigan and a friend identified as Michaela Le Grand, whom he referred to as his "Muse." The photo was taken by Erik Weber, in San Francisco's Washington Square Park in front of the Benjamin Franklin statue. The first chapter of the book is an extended and fanciful description of this photo.

The book is dedicated "For Jack Spicer and Ron Loewinsohn." Spicer reportedly helped Brautigan revise and edit the book as it was written, as well as arrange for public readings to help promote it.

Arion Press published a deluxe edition of Trout Fishing in America in 2003, with a preface by Ron Loewinsohn, and a color lithograph in half the edition by Wayne Thiebaud.

== Cultural influence ==
Apollo 17 astronaut Jack Schmitt named a crater explored on the Moon in the Taurus-Littrow valley as "Shorty", after the character in the book.

In March 1994, a teenager named Peter Eastman Jr. from Carpinteria, California legally changed his name to "Trout Fishing in America". At around the same time, National Public Radio reported on a young couple who had named their baby "Trout Fishing in America".

The song, "Tee Pees 1-12", from the album Fear Fun by Father John Misty, references the novella with the following lyrics: "Trout Fishing in America made me go and buy a pole. But by the time I got around to reading the book, I was a celebrated deep sea pro."
