= The Pill Versus the Springhill Mine Disaster =

Book by Richard Brautigan

- First softcover edition
- Author: Richard Brautigan
- Cover artist: Edmund Shea
- Language: English
- Genre: Poetry
- Publisher: Four Seasons Foundation
- Publication date: 1969
- Publication place: United States
- Media type: Print (Hardcover and Softcover)
- Pages: 108
- Preceded by: Please Plant This Book
- Followed by: Rommel Drives on Deep into Egypt

The Pill Versus the Springhill Mine Disaster is Richard Brautigan's seventh poetry publication. A limited, signed, hard cover edition of fifty copies was issued simultaneously with the soft cover version of the first edition.

The collection of ninety-eight poems includes thirty-eight that were previously uncollected. The rest were gathered from five of Brautigan's previous poetry publications. In some cases, all of the poems from an earlier book were included in this volume.

The title poem uses just four lines to draw a parallel between the 1958 Springhill mining disaster in Springhill, Nova Scotia, and the use by the author's lover of birth control pills.

When you take your pill
it's like a mine disaster.
I think of all the people
lost inside of you.
"The Pill versus The Springhill Mine Disaster" (1968)
