= Richard Brautigan =

American writer (1935–1984)

- Born: Richard Gary Brautigan; January 30, 1935; Tacoma, Washington, U.S.
- Died: c. September 16, 1984 (aged 49); Bolinas, California, U.S.
- Occupations: Novelist; poet; short story writer
- Writing career
- Genres: Magic realism; Gothic Western; fabulation; black comedy; satire; psychological fiction
- Notable works: Trout Fishing in America (1967); In Watermelon Sugar (1968); The Abortion: An Historical Romance 1966 (1971)
- Movement: Postmodernism

Richard Gary Brautigan (January 30, 1935 – c. September 16, 1984) was an American novelist, poet, and short story writer. He wrote throughout his life and published ten novels, two collections of short stories, and ten books of poetry. Brautigan's work has been published both in the United States and internationally throughout Europe, Japan, and China. He is best known for his novels Trout Fishing in America (1967), In Watermelon Sugar (1968), and The Abortion: An Historical Romance 1966 (1971).

== Early life ==
Brautigan was born in Tacoma, Washington, the only child of Bernard Frederick "Ben" Brautigan Jr. (July 29, 1908 – May 27, 1994), a factory worker and laborer, and Lulu Mary "Mary Lou" Keho (April 7, 1911 – September 24, 2005), a waitress. In May 1934, eight months before Richard's birth, Bernard and Mary Lou separated.

Brautigan said that he met his biological father only twice. But after Richard's death, Bernard appeared to have been unaware that Richard was his child, saying, "He's got the same last name, but why would they wait 45 to 50 years to tell me I've got a son?"

In 1938, Brautigan and his mother began living with Arthur Martin Titland. The couple had a daughter, Barbara Ann, born on May 1, 1939, in Tacoma. Brautigan said that he had a very traumatic experience when, at age nine, his mother left him and his four-year-old sister unattended in a motel room in Great Falls, Montana, for two days.

On January 20, 1943, Mary Lou married fry cook Robert Geoffrey Porterfield. The couple had a daughter named Sandra Jean, born April 1, 1945, at Salem General Hospital in Salem, Oregon. Mary Lou told Brautigan that Porterfield was his biological father, and Brautigan began using Richard Gary Porterfield as his name.

Mary Lou separated from Porterfield in 1946. She married William David Folston Sr. on June 12, 1950. The couple had a son named William David Jr., born on December 19, 1950, in Eugene. Brautigan said that Folston was a violent alcoholic, whom Richard had seen abusing his mother.

Brautigan was raised in poverty; he told his daughter stories of his mother sifting rat feces out of their supply of flour before making flour-and-water pancakes. Brautigan's family found it difficult to obtain food, and on some occasions they did not eat for days. The family lived on welfare and moved about the Pacific Northwest for nine years before settling in Eugene, Oregon, in August 1944.

Brautigan drew on his childhood in the poems and stories that he wrote from as early as the age of 12. His novel So the Wind Won't Blow It All Away (1982) is loosely based on childhood events, including an incident in which Brautigan accidentally shot the brother of a close friend in the ear, injuring him slightly.

On September 12, 1950, Brautigan enrolled at South Eugene High School. He wrote for his high school newspaper, the Eugene High School News. He also played on the school's basketball team. He was 6 feet 4 inches (1.93 m) tall by the time of his graduation. On December 19, 1952, Brautigan's first published poem, "The Light", appeared in the school newspaper. Brautigan graduated with honors from Eugene High School on June 9, 1953.

After graduation, he moved in with his best friend Peter Webster, and Peter's mother Edna Webster became a surrogate mother to Brautigan. According to several accounts, Brautigan stayed with the Websters for about a year before leaving for San Francisco for the first time in August 1954. He returned to Oregon several times, apparently for lack of money.

On December 14, 1955, Brautigan was arrested for throwing a rock through a police station window, supposedly to be sent to prison and fed. He was arrested for disorderly conduct and fined $25. He was committed to the Oregon State Hospital on December 24, 1955, after police noticed patterns of erratic behavior.

At the Oregon State Hospital Brautigan was diagnosed with paranoid schizophrenia and clinical depression, and was treated with electroconvulsive therapy 12 times. While institutionalized, he began writing The God of the Martians, a manuscript of 20 very short chapters totaling 600 words. The manuscript was sent to at least two editors but was rejected by both, and remains unpublished. (A copy of the manuscript was discovered with the papers of the last of those editors, Harry Hooton, sometime after 1961.)

On February 19, 1956, Brautigan was released from the hospital and briefly lived with his mother, stepfather, and siblings in Eugene. He left for San Francisco, where he would spend most of the rest of his life except for periods in Tokyo and Montana.

== Career ==
In San Francisco, Brautigan sought to establish himself as a writer. He was known for handing out his poetry on the streets and performing at poetry clubs. In early 1956, Brautigan typed a three-page manuscript and sent it to Macmillan Inc. for publication. The manuscript consisted of two pages with 14 poems and a page with the dedication "for Linda". Of the poems, only "stars" and "hey" were titled. In a letter dated May 10, 1956, Macmillan rejected the manuscript, stating, "... there is no place where it will fit in". In 2005, the X-Ray Book Company published the manuscript as a chapbook titled Desire in a Bowl of Potatoes.

Brautigan's first poetry book publication was The Return of the Rivers (1957), a single poem, followed by two collections of poetry: The Galilee Hitch-Hiker (1958) and Lay the Marble Tea (1959). During the 1960s Brautigan became involved in the burgeoning San Francisco counterculture scene, often appearing as a performance poet at concerts and participating in the various activities of The Diggers. He contributed several short pieces to be used as broadsides by the Communication Company. Brautigan was also a writer for Change, an underground newspaper created by Ron Loewinsohn.

In the summer of 1961, while camping in southern Idaho with his wife and daughter Ianthe, Brautigan completed the novels A Confederate General from Big Sur and Trout Fishing in America. A Confederate General from Big Sur was his debut novel, published in 1964, and met with little critical or commercial success.

But when Trout Fishing in America was published in 1967, Brautigan was catapulted to international fame. Literary critics labeled him the writer most representative of the emerging countercultural youth movement of the late 1960s, even though he was said to be contemptuous of hippies. Trout Fishing in America has sold over 4 million copies worldwide.

With his earnings, Brautigan bought a house in Bolinas and a ranch in Montana. He and his wife had separated when their daughter was two, and Ianthe lived mostly with him until she married.

During the 1960s Brautigan published four collections of poetry as well as another novel, In Watermelon Sugar (1968). In the spring of 1967 he was Poet-in-Residence at the California Institute of Technology. During this year, his chapbook, All Watched Over by Machines of Loving Grace, was published by The Communication Company. It was printed in an edition of 1,500 copies and distributed free.

From 1968 to 1970 Brautigan had 23 short pieces published in Rolling Stone magazine. From late 1968 to February 1969, Brautigan recorded a spoken-word album for The Beatles' short-lived record-label, Zapple. The label was shut down by Allen Klein before the recording could be released. It was released in 1970 on Harvest Records as Listening to Richard Brautigan.

In the 1970s Brautigan experimented with literary genres. He published five novels (the first of which, The Abortion: An Historical Romance 1966, had been written in the mid-1960s) and a collection of short stories, Revenge of the Lawn (1971). In 1974 The Cowell Press collected seven of his broadside poems into the book Seven Watermelon Suns. The limited edition of ten copies included embossed color etchings by Ellen Meske.

"When the 1960s ended, he was the baby thrown out with the bath water," said his friend and fellow writer, Thomas McGuane. "He was a gentle, troubled, deeply odd guy." Generally dismissed by literary critics and increasingly abandoned by his readers, Brautigan found his popularity waned throughout the late 1970s and 1980s. His work remained popular in Europe, however, as well as in Japan, where Brautigan visited several times.

To some of his critics, Brautigan was naive. Lawrence Ferlinghetti said of him, "As an editor I was always waiting for Richard to grow up as a writer. It seems to me he was essentially a naïf, and I don't think he cultivated that childishness, I think it came naturally. It was like he was much more in tune with the trout in America than with people."

Brautigan's writings are characterized by a remarkable and humorous imagination. A proliferation of inventive metaphors lent even his prose works the feeling of poetry. Also apparent are themes drawn from Zen Buddhism, such as the duality of the past and the future and the impermanence of the present. Brautigan's last publication before his death in 1984 was his novel So the Wind Won't Blow It All Away (1982).

The Edna Webster Collection of Undiscovered Writings was published in 1999. Brautigan, then twenty-one, had given this collection of writings to Edna Webster in 1955, when he left Oregon for San Francisco.

In 2002, a proposed edition of Brautigan's collected poems was rejected by his estate. In November 2016 the French publisher Le Castor Astral published a bilingual edition entitled Tout ce que j'ai à déclarer: œuvre poétique complète.

== Personal life ==
On June 8, 1957, Brautigan married Virginia Dionne Alder in Reno, Nevada. The couple had one daughter together, Ianthe Elizabeth Brautigan, born on March 25, 1960, in San Francisco. Brautigan's alcoholism and depression caused him to become increasingly abusive and Alder ended the relationship on December 24, 1962, though the divorce was not finalized until July 28, 1970. Brautigan continued to reside in San Francisco after the separation, while Alder settled in Manoa, Hawaii, and became a feminist and an anti-Vietnam War activist.

Brautigan remarried on December 1, 1977, to the Japanese-born Akiko Yoshimura, whom he met in July 1976 while living in Tokyo. The couple settled in Pine Creek, Park County, Montana, for two years. Brautigan and Yoshimura divorced in 1980.

Brautigan had a relationship with Marcia Clay of San Francisco from 1981 to 1982. He also pursued a brief relationship with Janice Meissner, a woman from the North Beach community of San Francisco. Other relationships were with Marcia Pacaud, who appears on the cover of The Pill Versus the Springhill Mine Disaster; Valerie Estes, who appears on the cover of Listening to Richard Brautigan; and Sherry Vetter, who appears on the cover of Revenge of the Lawn.

Brautigan was an alcoholic throughout his adult life; according to his daughter, he often mentioned suicide over a period of more than a decade before ending his life.

== Death ==
In 1984, at age 49, Richard Brautigan had moved to Bolinas, California, where he was living alone in a large, old house that he had bought with his earnings years earlier. He died of a self-inflicted .44 Magnum gunshot wound to the head. His decomposed body was found by David Fechheimer, a friend and private investigator, on October 25, 1984. The body was found on the living room floor, in front of a large window that, though shrouded by trees, looked out over the Pacific Ocean. Due to the decomposition of the body it is speculated that Brautigan had ended his life over a month earlier, on September 16, 1984, days after talking to friend Marcia Clay on the telephone (neighbors heard a loud noise that Sunday while watching an NFL game). Brautigan was survived by his parents, both ex-wives, and his daughter Ianthe.

According to Michael Caines, writing in The Times Literary Supplement, the story that Brautigan left a suicide note that simply read: "Messy, isn't it?" is apocryphal. Ianthe Brautigan has confirmed that her father did not leave such a message.

== Legacy ==
Because Brautigan frequently wrote in first-person and included locations and events with which he is associated, readers might assume his work is autobiographical. Writing in 1972, Long Island University professor Terrence Malley points out that "Brautigan's books are for the most part both directly autobiographical and curiously elusive ... It's usually difficult to separate confession from whimsy in Brautigan's writing" (18).

Several later authors have cited Brautigan as an influence, including Haruki Murakami, W. P. Kinsella, Christopher Moore and Sarah Hall.

The Library for Unpublished Works envisioned by Brautigan in his novel The Abortion was housed at the Brautigan Library in Burlington, Vermont, until 1995 when it was moved to the nearby Fletcher Free Library where it remained until 2005. Although there were plans to move it to the Presidio branch of the San Francisco Public Library, these never materialized. However, after an agreement was made between Brautigan's daughter, Ianthe Brautigan, and the Clark County Historical Museum (in Vancouver, Washington), the Brautigan Library was moved to the museum in 2010.

The industrial rock band Machines of Loving Grace took its name from one of Brautigan's poems. The 1992 EP Boo! Forever by alternative rock band The Boo Radleys and the 2014 album Boo, Forever by indie rock band Field Guides both take their title from the Brautigan poem of the same name.

In March 1994, a teenager named Peter Eastman Jr. from Carpinteria, California, legally changed his name to Trout Fishing in America, and now teaches English at Waseda University in Japan.

In March 2018, poet Francis Daulerio published Please Plant This Book – a reinterpretation of and homage to Brautigan's book of the same name on its 50th anniversary. The publication contained seeds to be planted, packed in sleeves which carry poems by Daulerio and illustrations by Scott Hutchison. Profits from the book were to go to The American Foundation for Suicide Prevention. Hutchison took his own life in May 2018, and in September an expanded version was published as a chapbook, the original edition having sold out, containing a foreword by Ianthe Brautigan and an afterword by Scottish poet Michael Pedersen.

The music video for Kat Meoz's "Here I Wait" directed by Kansas Bowling recreates Brautigan's book covers and features the only footage in existence of the actual Willard who inspired Willard and His Bowling Trophies.

The Adam Curtis-directed documentary series All Watched Over by Machines of Loving Grace was named after a poem written by Brautigan.

Dario Amodei, a computer scientist, titled a 2024 essay: “Machines of Loving Grace". This title is taken from a 1967 poem by Richard Brautigan.
