= Foreign interventions by Cuba =

Aspect of Cuban foreign policy

The small island nation of Cuba had impacts throughout the world.

Cuba intervened into numerous conflicts during the Cold War. The country sent medical and military aid into foreign countries to aid Socialist governments and rebel groups. These interventionist policies were controversial and resulted in isolation from many countries. Due to the ongoing Cold War, Cuba attempted make allies across Latin America and Africa. Cuba believed it had more freedom to intervene in Africa as the U.S. was more concerned about Latin America. Still, the US was strongly opposed to Cuban involvement in Africa and continued Cuban intervention was a major source of tension. Cuban intervention was often confidential and all Cuban doctors and soldiers were forced to keep their location confidential.

In Latin America, Cuba supported numerous rebel movements, including in Nicaragua, and in Bolivia where Che Guevara attempted to foment an insurgency. In 1959, Cuba unsuccessfully invaded Panama and the Dominican Republic. Within Africa, Cuba supported numerous independence movements, including in Angola, Guinea-Bissau, and Mozambique. Che Guevara also went to the Democratic Republic of the Congo (Zaire) to support the Simba rebellion. Cuba's largest foreign interventions were in Angola in support of the MPLA and in Ethiopia in support of Mengistu Haile Mariam during the Ogaden War. Cuba also intervened militarily in the Arab world including in Yemen, Algeria, Iraq, and in support of Syria during the October 1973 War. They also supported the People's Revolutionary Government during the United States invasion of Grenada. While most Cuban military interventions were Soviet-backed, Cuba often worked independently and at times even supported opposing sides. General Leopoldo Cintra Frías, who served in both Angola and Ethiopia, stated, "The Soviets were never able to control us although I think that was their intention on more than one occasion."

Cuban foreign policy was motivated by both idealism and realpolitik. It publicly justified its interventions into foreign conflicts for a number of reasons; to spread their revolutionary ideas, aid "liberation movements" fighting for independence, and to protect the territorial sovereignty of allied nations. Cuban leader Fidel Castro stated: "Our Revolution is not a revolution of millionaires. Instead, it is one carried out by the poor, and is one which dreams of ensuring the well-being not only of our own poor, but rather of all the poor in this world. And that is why we talk of internationalism." Cuba was the only economically lesser developed nation with extensive military intervention in Africa. Cuba was a strong supporter of the Organization for African Unity's emphasis on border protection and African independence.

Following the dissolution of the Soviet Union in 1991 and facing the economic difficulties during the Special Period, Cuba continued to maintain a presence in Africa, including the service of many doctors. Cuban medical internationalism was a prominent feature of their interventions alongside military aspects. Medical internationalism consisted of four prevailing approaches: emergency response medical teams sent overseas; establishment abroad of public health systems for providing free health care for local residents; taking in foreign patients to Cuba for free treatment; and providing medical training for foreigners, to Cuba and overseas. All Cuban doctors overseas were volunteers.

== Background ==
During the Cold War, Cuba often positioned itself internationally by providing direct military assistance to those who shared the same ideology and to resistance movements with at least 200,000 members of the Cuban Revolutionary Armed Forces (FAR) serving in foreign territories during the period. Cuba perceived its interventions to be a method of directly combating the international influence of the United States. Cuba also sought to place its troops into international conflicts in order to build combat expertise among their ranks.

Informally, Cuba's ambitions of foreign military intervention began shortly after the Cuban Revolution in 1959, though it was officially adopted and pronounced in 1966 by Fidel Castro at the Organization of Solidarity with the People of Asia, Africa and Latin America. Cuba often received military and logistical assistance from the Soviet Union and Warsaw Pact nations when participating in interventionist initiatives throughout Africa and Latin America.

== History ==
=== 1959 Panama invasion attempt ===
1959 Panama invasion attempt
Date	23 April 1959
Location	Panama
Status	Cuban expedition failed

Belligerents
Cuba	Panama

Commanders and leaders
(Cuba) Fidel Castro	(Panama) Ernesto de la Guardia

One of the first foreign actions taken by Cuba only months after the Revolution included an attempted coup in Panama on 24 April 1959. The coup was repelled by members of the Panamanian National Guard.

=== 1959 Dominican Republic invasion attempt ===
1959 Dominican Republic invasion attempt
Date	14 June 1959
Location	Dominican Republic
Status	Cuban invasion failed

Belligerents
Cuba	Dominican Republic

Commanders and leaders
(Cuba) Fidel Castro (Cuba) Delio Gómez Ochoa (national hero of the Dominican Republic)	(Dominican Republic) Rafael Trujillo

Strength
224 men	16 garrison soldiers

Casualties and losses
(Cuba) 217 killed (Cuba) 7 captured	None

The Dominican Republic was invaded on 14 June 1959. Fifty-six men (Cubans, Guatemalans, Dominican exiles, and American communists) landed a C-56 transport aircraft in Constanza. As soon as the invaders landed, they were massacred by the fifteen-man Dominican garrison. A week later, two yachts offloaded another group of invaders onto Chris-Craft launches for a landing on the north coast. Dominican Air Force pilots fired rockets from their British-made Vampire jets into the approaching launches, killing most of the invaders.

=== Sand War ===
The first official foreign deployment of Cuba's armed forces was in Algeria during the 1963 Sand War. Hundreds of Cuban troops arrived in Algeria on 22 October 1963, upon request from Algerian president Ahmed Ben Bella. Castro was convinced that the United States sought Ben Balla's overthrow and was determined to prevent this from happening. Under the command of Efigenio Ameijeiras, Cuba deployed twenty-two T-34 tanks, eighteen 120-mm mortars, a battery of 57-mm recoilless rifles, anti-aircraft artillery with eighteen guns, and eighteen 122mm field guns with the crews to operate them. Castro sought to keep the operation covert in order to avoid international backlash, with many Cuban troops participating in the conflict wearing Algerian uniforms. However, French forces quickly discovered Cuban intervention and reported it to other governments. Apparently the Cubans did not actively participate in combat, and they were eventually withdrawn by the end of the year after providing training to Algerians in the use of military hardware.

=== Venezuela and Machurucuto raid ===
Soon after taking following the Cuban Revolution, Fidel Castro sought to take advantage of relations with Venezuela and incorporate its oil wealth within Cuba and quickly began to make relations with Venezuela guerrillas. President of Venezuela Rómulo Betancourt cut ties with Cuba in 1961 as part of the Betancourt Doctrine, which saw Venezuela breaking relations with governments that came to power through non-democratic means. In July 1964, the Organization of American States sanctioned Cuba after a cache of weapons destined for the Fuerzas Armadas de Liberación Nacional was discovered on Venezuela's shores. In May 1967, the Machurucuto raid saw Cuban troops attempting to make their way into the Andes to train Venezuelan guerrillas, but they were captured by the Venezuelan Army and National Guard.

=== Congo Crisis ===
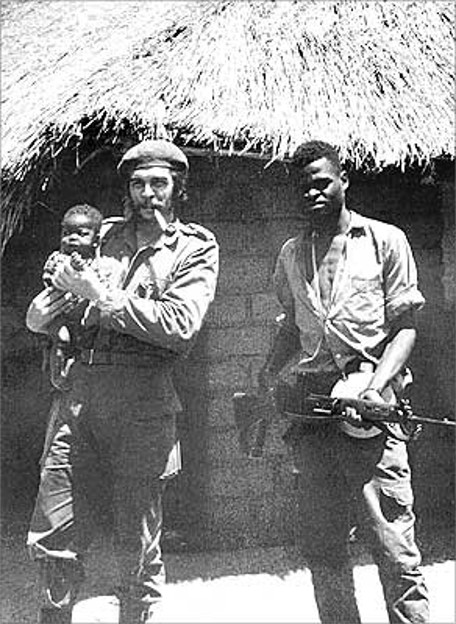
Che Guevara, holding a Congolese baby and standing with an Afro-Cuban soldier during the Congo Crisis, 1965

During the Congo Crisis, Cuba intervened between April and November of 1965 and provided hundreds of personnel to assist the Conseil National de Liberation (CNL), also known as the Simbas, with overthrowing the Congolese government. The CNL was fighting against the government under Moïse Tshombe that took power of the DRC following the assassination of Patrice Lumumba. The Tshombe government was supported by the United States and South Africa.

Map highlighting the zones where Guevara and the Cubans fought, 1965

In December 1964, just prior to his time in the Congo, Che Guevara gave a speech speaking out against western imperialism in front of the UN General Assembly. Guevara's speech demonstrated Cuban motives for supporting the CNL against the US back Congolese government. Soon after, Castro decided to send Guevara along with Víctor Dreke and 137 other Cuban soldiers to support the CNL, revolutionary followers of the deceased Patrice Lumumba. Cuba supported the CNL along with the African states of Algeria, Egypt, and Zanzibar, all of whom were especially frustrated by US involvement. The group flew to Dar es Salaam, Tanzania and crossed Lake Tanganyika into the Congo. Guevara previously underwent cosmetic surgery and did not tell either the Tanzanians or the CNL that he was coming. While in the Congo, Guevara operated under the code name "Tatu", meaning third. When they arrived, the Cubans were surprised to find much less fighting and fewer CNL soldiers than expected. Only between 1,000 and 1,500 CNL rebels remained in the region to fight, and CNL leadership initially did not provide the Cubans with any tasks. Guevara struggled to have productive conversations with CNL leader Laurent Kabila. The CNL allowed the Cubans to begin engaging in larger battles in June, but they had only small military successes. The Cubans also trained the CNL soldiers in the guerrilla military tactics used in the Cuban revolution and taught to other revolutionary movements around the world. Both sides faced prejudice and differences with the other, which was made only more difficult by the language barrier. While in the Congo, the Cubans faced harsh conditions and illnesses, and Guevara contracted both malaria and asthma.

The Cubans withdrew in November after seven months for a mixture of reasons. First, Algeria had been another source of foreign support for the CNL, but it underwent a coup in June. In October, the Organization for African Unity met in Accra, Ghana, and demanded the exit of all foreign military presence in the Congo, including the Cubans. Then in November, General Mobutu took power and negotiated peace agreements with neighboring states such as Tanzania. Dar es Salaam had served as a supporter and essential entry and exit point for the Cubans, but they warned the Cubans they would no longer be able to help them. The Léopoldville government also offered independence to all CNL members who renounced support. Finally, throughout their time in the Congo, the Cubans saw marginal military success and faced many setbacks and struggles. The CNL leadership struggled with rivalries and lacked of strong united leadership on the ground. The Cuban mission was forced to eventually make the decision to withdraw.

In November, the Cubans crossed Lake Tanganyika back into Tanzania and flew back home. Guevara considered his efforts in the Congo to be a great failure. Along with the withdrawal of the Cubans, 17 young CNL fighters traveled to Havana with the goal of receiving training and continue the war. However, problems within the Congolese government prevented their return. Some families and close relatives of CNL members also moved to Cuba leading to the development of a shared Cuban and Congolese identity and community. Guevara continued on to Bolivia where he was eventually executed after being captured by a CIA agent.

=== Guinea-Bissau War of Independence ===
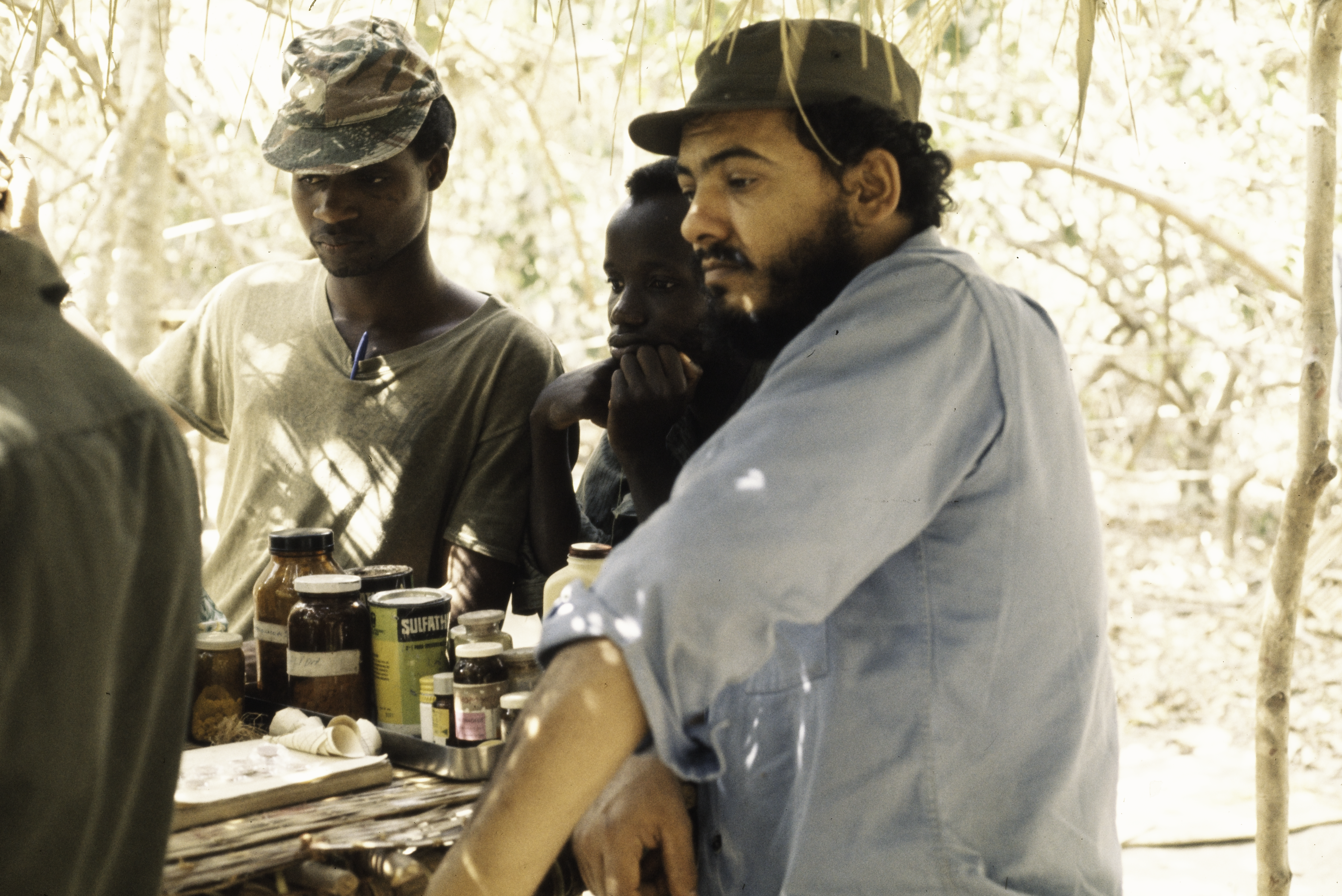
Cuban and Guinean doctors working together in Guinea-Bissau

Cuba was extensively involved in supporting the PAIGC during the independence movement in Guinea-Bissau against the Portuguese. During the war Cuba kept their involvement a secret, but supplied extensive aid, military support, and doctors. Cuba believed that outcomes in Guinea-Bissau would impact Portuguese morale and success in more strategic countries such as Mozambique and Angola. Cuba was also motivated to support anti-imperialist movements and felt it owed Africa for the slaves that helped build Cuba. While helping fight, nine Cubans died in Guinea-Bissau between 1966 and 1974. Cuba’s experience with guerrilla fighting strategy fit well with the war for independence in Guinea-Bissau.

The independence movement in Guinea-Bissau was led by the PAIGC under Amílcar Cabral. The PAIGC was established in September 1956 and became widely respected as one of the strongest independence movements in Africa. Although Cabral was not a Marxist, he was progressive and interpreted the conflict in Guinea-Bissau through the lens of a class struggle. Cabral was widely respected among revolutionaries and officials in Cuba. In 1962, Cabral tried to see if he could receive US support, but the US was too concerned with Portuguese relations and protecting their strategic use of their Azores base. In 1963, Cabral first asked Cuba for help training and educating military officials. Cuba agreed but did not initially fulfill the request. In December 1964, Che Guevara was impressed by Cabral when he made his first trip to Guinea-Conakry, where PAIGC leaders were headquartered. That May, Cuba made its first delivery of supplies to the PAIGC, including medicine, food and arms. Cabral first met Castro at the Tricontinental Conference in January 1966. Cabral explained the situation in Guinea-Bissau and impressed Castro with his knowledge and skills as a leader. During the meeting, Castro promised doctors, military instructors and mechanics to Cabral, and a couple months later Cuba began distributing large amounts of aid. Additionally, following the meeting Oscar Oramas was installed as the new ambassador for Conakry at the request of Cabral.

All Cubans who traveled to help in Africa were volunteers. The presence of Cubans in Guinea-Bissau was secret and the volunteers were instructed to tell their families they were being sent to the USSR to receive training. The average Cuban volunteer stayed 18 months and faced difficult conditions including malaria, parasites and a limited food supply. Cabral requested that the Cuban volunteers were black so that they would blend in with the local population and Cuban presence could remain confidential. Cabral hoped to use the conflict to build a sense of national identity, so he limited the amount of foreign aid that he would accept. Cuban volunteers were the only foreigners that Cabral allowed to fight alongside the PAIGC. Still, both US and Portuguese officials had suspicions about the presence of Cuban troops that were confirmed with the capture of Cuban Captain Pedro Rodríguez Peralta, who was taken as a prisoner of war by Portuguese troops. Peralta was taken to Portugal to be tried while Cuba attempted to negotiate his independence. Portugal claimed Peralta would only be released if Cuba admitted to sending troops to Guinea-Bissau, which it refused to do. Cuba claimed Peralta was only in Guinea-Bissau to visit his colleagues who were doctors helping in the region. Portugal convicted Peralta of serving as a training instructor and advisor to the PAIGC. The Cuban press recognized the capture of Rodríguez Peralta on 10 September 1974, the same day that the Portuguese government recognized the independence of Guinea-Bissau following the Portuguese coup.

A failed attack on the strategically important camp in Madina de Boé led Castro to assign Víctor Dreke to lead the military effort. Dreke was well respected for his fighting in Zaire. Castro also increased the number of troops to almost 60 Cubans. Dreke was an experienced fighter who was well liked and respected by his troops. The US was so impressed with the military tact and skill set that it believed Cuba had sent 7,000 troops with extensive aid and support from the USSR. By January 1966 the Portuguese increased the size of their troops from 20,000 to 25,000 but continued to suffer losses to the PAIGC.

Consistent with behavior across Africa, Cuba never imposed its wishes on the PAIGC. Cuban officials provided Cabral with advice but always respected his ultimate decisions because they respected that it was not their country and they provided unconditional aid without demands. Cuba knew that Cabral was not a true Marxist and did not expect a liberated Guinea-Bissau to be Marxist.

In addition to providing troops, Cuba supplied many doctors to Guinea-Bissau. There were no modern trained doctors in Guinea-Bissau prior to the aid provided by the Cubans in 1968. The doctors provided aid to both soldiers and civilians and were also present at the battle front. The presence of Cuban doctors empowered PAIGC soldiers to fight harder because they had hope of being healed.

=== First Yemenite War ===
Cuban pilots flew combat as well as training missions for the People's Democratic Republic of Yemen (South Yemen) during the Yemenite War of 1972.

=== October 1973 War ===
During the Yom Kippur War in October 1973, Cuba provided 4,000 troops to Syria to assist Syria's attack against Israel. Helicopters and tanks were also provided by the Cuban military. Fighting on the Golan Heights front continued until May 1974, by which time an Israeli counterattack had largely defeated the Cuban-Syrian tank forces. The Cubans reportedly suffered casualties of approximately 180 killed and 250 wounded. After the Agreement on Disengagement between Israel and Syria in May 1974, Israel remained in possession of the Golan Heights, and all Cuban forces were withdrawn in January 1975.

=== Armed resistance in Chile ===
Cuba was the main supporter of the communist insurgency in Chile from 1973 to 1990. Cuba provided the Marxist rebel groups MIR and FPMR with weapons and financial support, as well as shelter, training inside Cuba, and logistical support. Cuba also created an operations room to politically unite the MIR and FPMR under Cuban command.

=== Conflicts in Angola ===
As the Angolan Civil War broke out, Cuban intervention in Angola was a large-scale intervention to support the People's Movement for the Liberation of Angola (MPLA). Cuba had provided military support to MPLA under the leadership of Agostinho Neto since the early 1960. In late-1974, Cuba sent Major Alfonso Perez Morales and Carlos Cadelo to assess the situation in Angola after receiving requests for military aid. As the South African Border War intensified and more foreign actors entered into the Angolan Civil War, Cuba grew more involved. On 3 August 1975, a second Cuban mission arrived and provided US$100,000 to the MPLA. Apartheid South Africa intervened in support of the FLNA and UNITA. By 15 August 1975, Castro had demanded that the USSR provide more assistance to the MPLA, though the demand was declined. Cuban troops began to depart for Angola on 21 August 1975; important personnel utilized commercial aircraft while standard troops were transported by cargo ships. On 6 October, Cuba and the MPLA engaged in a clash with the FNLA and South African troops at Norton de Matos, resulting in a significant defeat for Cuba and the MPLA. While the Cuban troops were still in the midst of crossing the Atlantic, the South Africans had apparently airlifted a limited number of troops and armored cars to central Angola.

On 4 November 1975, Castro launched Operation Carlota against FNLA, Zaire, and the SADF at the request of Neto. 4,000 Cuban troops arrived in Angola shortly after on 9 November, and the number quickly grew to 20,000 with Soviet support. Cuba strongly opposed the US supported white minority rule in South Africa so they were strongly opposed to SADF intervention. In the Battle of Quifangondo (10 November 1975), the MPLA, supported by Cuban troops, defeated FNLA supported by the South African Defense Force (SADF). On 25 November 1975, as the FLNA/SADF crossed a bridge, MPLA/Cubans hidden along the banks of the river attacked, destroying seven armored cars and killing upwards of 90 enemy soldiers.

Between 9 and 12 December, Cuban and South African troops engaged in battle between Santa Comba and Quibala, resulting in the defeat of the Cubans. One notable casualty was Raúl Argüello, a commander and veteran of the Cuban Revolution, who was killed when his vehicle struck a land mine. Concurrently, UNITA troops and another South African mechanized unit captured Luso. These defeats prompted a significant increase in the number of Cuban troops being airlifted to Angola, more than doubling from approximately 400 per week to perhaps a thousand. Among these reinforcements were seasoned veterans of the Cuban Revolution and Latin American conflicts.

By the end of 1975, over 25,000 Cuban troops were deployed into Angola to assist the MPLA. In mid-January 1976, the South Africans withdrew from Cela and Santa Comba in Angola, moving to a position north of the Angolan-Namibian border. This decision was likely influenced by the increased presence of Cuban troops.

In February 1976, Cuban forces launched Operation Pañuelo Blanco (White Handkerchief) against an estimated 700 FLEC insurgents. This operation succeeded in annihilating the FLEC force. The Cuban troops came to have in the first campaign of 1975–1976 some 400 tanks, and in the final campaign of 1988, near 1,000 tanks.

In May 1977, Cubans played an important role in supporting the MPLA government of Agostinho Neto and foiling the Nitista Plot in which Nito Alves and José Jacinto Van-Dúnem split from the government and led an uprising. Neto believed the Soviet Union had supported the plot and Cuban soldiers helped defeat the uprising. Cuba sent an additional 4,000 soldiers to prevent further unrest within the MPLA. Thousands of people were estimated to have been massacred by MPLA and Cuban troops in the aftermath of the attempted coup over a period of two years. Amnesty International estimated 30,000 were killed in the purge.

Castro made it clear that the Cubans would not withdraw from Angola until there was no longer an external threat. The United States attempted to leverage the status of their relationship with Cuba on the withdrawal of Cuba from Angola. The US used linkage techniques to argue that South Africa would leave Angola when Cuba did as well. However, Castro refused to let the US control its position in Africa and maintained that Cuba would stay in Angola as long as the MPLA wanted them. Castro claimed Namibia must first be independent so that SWAPO could leave Angola and that South Africa must stop supporting UNITA.

The next major battle involving Cubans occurred in 1988. The crisis began in 1987 with an assault by Soviet-equipped MPLA troops (People's Armed Forces of Liberation of Angola (FAPLA)) against the pro-Western rebel movement UNITA in the country's south. Soon, the SADF intervened in support of beleaguered UNITA and the MPLA offensive stalled. Acting independently from Moscow, Havana reinforced its African ally, increasing its deployed number to 55,000 troops, tanks, artillery and MiG-23s, prompting Pretoria to call up 140,000 reservists. On 15 February 1988, the South Africans launched an attack on the MLPA's defenses, breaking through and encircling the 59th MLPA Brigade. Seven Cuban tanks counterattacked; all were destroyed but the 59th Brigade was able to escape. In June 1988, SADF armor and artillery engaged FAPLA-Cuban mechanized forces at Techipa, killing 290 Angolans and 10 Cubans. In retaliation, Cuban warplanes conducted airstrikes against South African troops. However, both sides quickly pulled back to avoid an escalation of hostilities and the Battle of Cuito Cuanavale stalemated. Cuban and Angolan military officials met US and South African officials in Cape Verde on 22 July 1988 and agreed to an immediate ceasefire and for South Africa to withdraw all its troops by 1 September. 2,077 Cubans had died in Angola by the time the last forces returned home in 1991.

=== Ogaden War ===
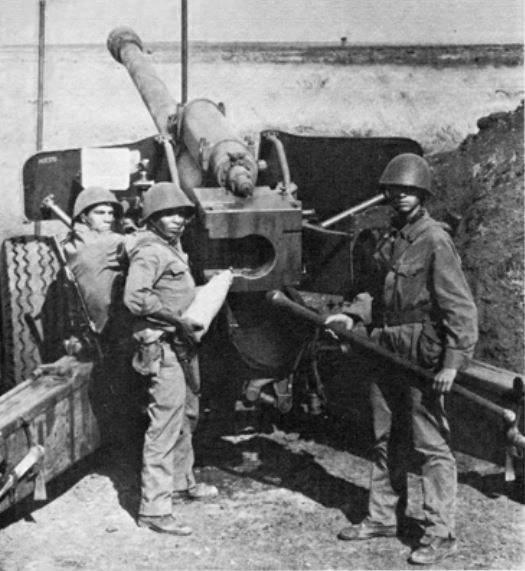
Cuban artillerymen in Ethiopia during the Ogaden War, 1977

The Ogaden War (1977–1978) began when Somalia attempted to invade Ethiopia while it was undergoing the Ethiopian Civil War. Cuba sent armored cars, artillery, T-62 tanks, and MiGs to assist the Provisional Military Government of Socialist Ethiopia (Derg).

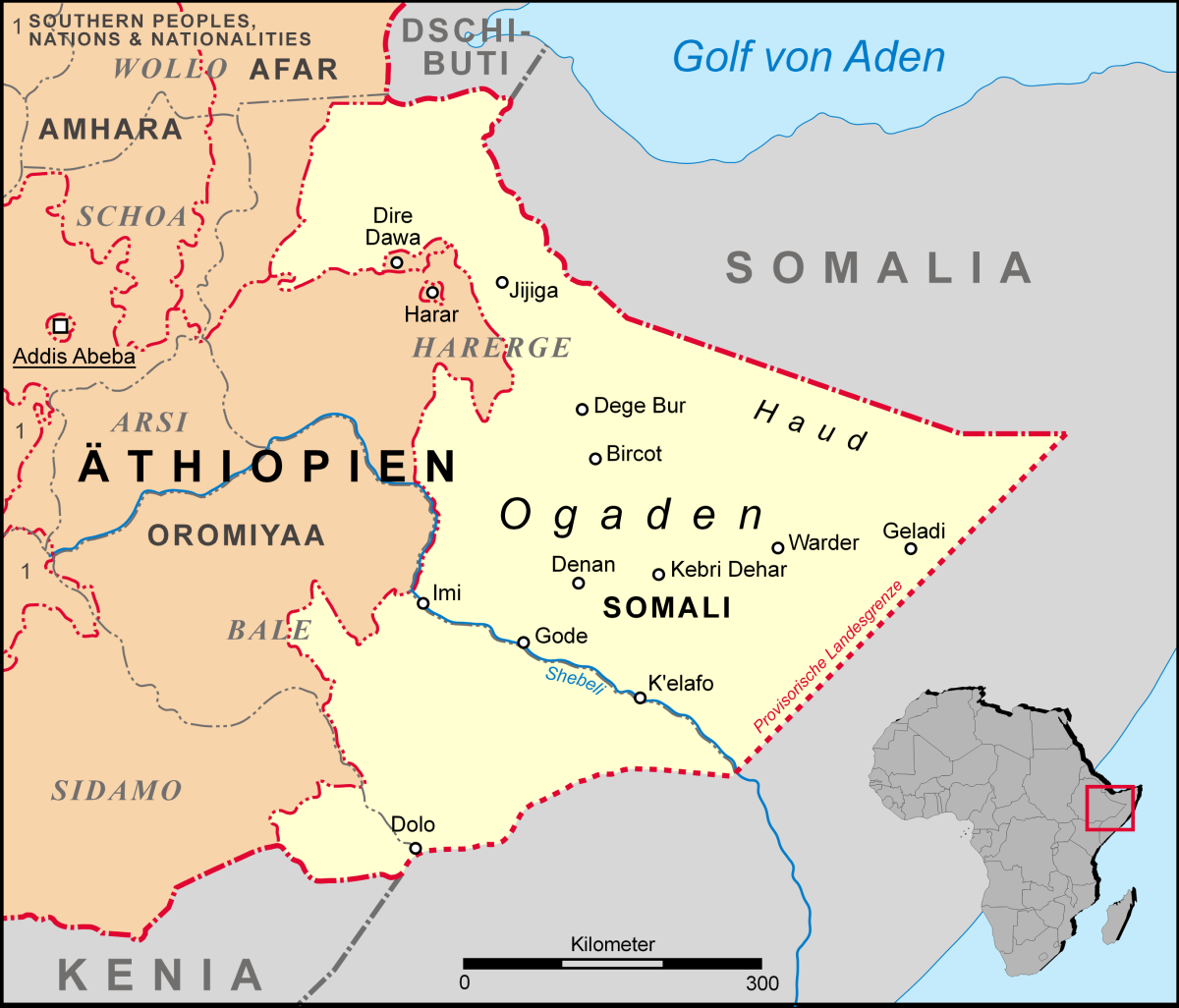
The Ogaden region of Ethiopia borders Somalia

Somalia initially invaded the Ogaden during the summer of 1977 and controlled up to 90% of the region after several initial victories. In November 1977, Cuba deployed 16,000 troops under General Arnaldo Ochoa to support Ethiopia against the Somali invasion. Although Cuba acted independently, the Soviets supported Cuba’s decision to support Ethiopia. The Soviets helped train 50,000 Ethiopians and sent military hardware. Territorial integrity was a core value for the Cubans, and Somalia’s invasion violated territorial sovereignty agreements under the Organization of African Unity. Castro met Ethiopia’s leader, Mengistu, in early 1977 and decided he liked him as a revolutionary leader and wanted to provide support. Cuba was hesitant to send troops, but did so when it became clear that the Somali invasion would otherwise succeed. Cuban troops and warplanes played a major part in the expulsion of Somalia from the Ogaden region. However, the presence of Cuban troops in the Ogaden region allowed Ethiopia to focus its troops on a violent invasion of Eritrea in the north. Castro was opposed to the battle in Eritrea, so Cuban troops were only permitted on the Ogaden front. Castro attempted to form a socialist federation between Eritrea, Somalia and Ethiopia, but it was they rejected it. To this day Castro is seen in Ethiopia as a revolutionary hero and beloved for his aid during the Ogaden war. Simultaneously, he is viewed in Somalia as an imperialist and blamed for thousands of Somali deaths. Somalia believes the Ogaden, which is inhabited largely by ethnic Somalis, would be a part of Somalia today if were not for the Cubans.

=== Nicaraguan Revolution ===
During the Nicaraguan Revolution, Cuba supplied military aid and logistics to Sandinista National Liberation Front (FSLN) guerrillas. Cuban military and intelligence personnel subsequently became incorporated into the ranks of Nicaragua's security services. Some Cuban personnel were accused of abuses, including an incident where a Cuban adviser killed two civilians in Nueva Guinea after one spilled beer on his uniform.

=== United States invasion of Grenada ===
On 25 October 1983, the US invaded Grenada and overthrew its government. The invasion was triggered by tensions within the People's Revolutionary Government of Grenada which had resulted in the house arrest and execution of the previous leader of Grenada Maurice Bishop six days earlier, and the establishment of the Cuban-supported Revolutionary Military Council with Hudson Austin as Chairman. Most of the resistance came from Cuban construction workers, while the Grenadan People's Revolutionary Army surrendered without putting up much resistance. The Cuban casualties amounted to 24 killed, with only 2 of them being professional soldiers, and the remainder of the Cuban force on the island was expelled.

=== Espionage in Venezuela ===
Ties between Cuba and Venezuela resumed in 1974 after guerrilla activity decreased in Venezuela. When Cuba began to enter its Special Period which saw domestic economic collapse, it once again became motivated to take control of Venezuela's oil wealth. In 1987, future Venezuelan president Nicolás Maduro moved to Cuba where he was trained by Pedro Miret Prieto, a senior member of the Politburo of the Communist Party of Cuba with direct links to Fidel Castro. When Maduro returned to Venezuela, he was allegedly tasked with serving as a Cuban mole to infiltrate Hugo Chávez's MBR-200. Venezuelan intelligence had also later discovered that Cuban Dirección de Inteligencia agents remained in Venezuela following the second inauguration of Carlos Andrés Pérez and eventually escalated political tensions during the Caracazo riots in 1989.

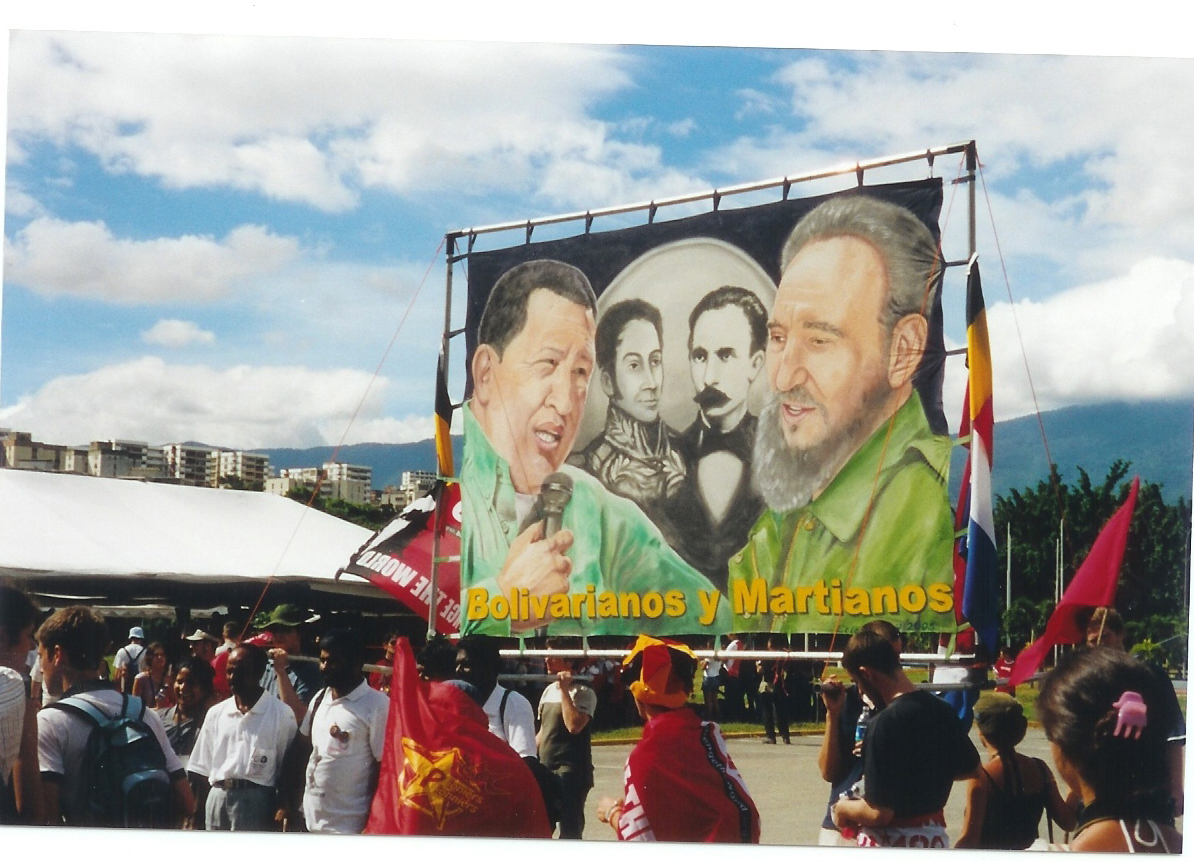
Hugo Chávez and Fidel Castro seen on a Bolivarian propaganda board

In Venezuela, Cuba has continued to be encouraged with intervening in Venezuela so the country can receive necessary commodities and other supplies, such as oil. According to retired Venezuelan General Carlos Julio Peñaloza Zambrano, Cuban agents might have entered Venezuela during Carlos Andrés Pérez's inauguration ceremony, which was attended by Castro, and they may have waited for unrest to occur in Venezuela to exacerbate political tensions after the Caracazo. Still suffering from the effects of Cuba's Special Period, Castro built a relationship with emerging political figure Hugo Chávez.

=== 1992 Venezuelan coup d'état attempts ===
During Hugo Chávez's 1992 Venezuelan coup d'état attempts, Castro was allegedly involved with the conspiracy and provided logistical assistance in order to establish a Venezuelan president as an ally. In 1994, Chávez and other rebels were pardoned by President Rafael Caldera an alleged accomplice of the 1992 coup attempts. Chávez would go on to visit Cuba the same year on 14 December, during the Special Period, where he was personally received by Castro with head of state honors. During his visit, Chávez gave a speech in the University of Havana Aula Magna before Castro and the Cuban high hierarchy where, among other things, he said "We have a long-term strategic project, in which Cubans have and would have much to contribute" and "it is a project with a horizon of twenty to forty years, a sovereign economic model". Chávez was elected president of Venezuela in 1998 and a year later in 1999, he proclaimed that "Venezuela is traveling towards the same sea as the Cuban people", calling Cuba and Venezuela "one country united".

=== Activities in Venezuela ===
Following the 2002 Venezuelan coup d'état attempt, Chávez's grew even closer to the Cuban government in order to maintain power and replaced military advisors with Cuban intelligence personnel. Chávez and Castro would now maintain the relationship of Venezuelan commodities traded for Cuban intelligence and logistics so both could maintain popularity. By 2010, former Major General Antonio Rivero claimed that about 92,700 Cuban officials were operating in various offices of Venezuela's government with a 2018 claim of about 46,000 members of the Cuban Revolutionary Armed Forces within Venezuela to assist Chávez's successor, Nicolás Maduro.

32 Cuban soldiers were killed in action during the 2026 United States intervention in Venezuela.

== See also ==
- Foreign interventions by China
- Foreign interventions by the Soviet Union
- Foreign interventions by the United States
- Caribbean Legion
- Cuban military internationalism

== Sources ==
- Márquez, Laureano; Sanabria, Eduardo (2018). Historieta de Venezuela: De Macuro a Maduro (1st ed.). Gráficas Pedrazas. ISBN 978-1-7328777-1-9.
