= Rene Mederos =

René Mederos
- Born: Felix René Mederos Pazos; November 20, 1933; Sagua la Grande, Cuba
- Died: September 24, 1996 (aged 62); Havana, Cuba
- Known for: Poster, Graphic design, Political poster, Mural
- Movement: Cuban revolutionary graphic design

Felix René Mederos Pazos (20 November 1933 – 24 September 1996) was a prominent Cuban poster artist and graphic designer.

== Biography ==
Mederos, a self-taught artist from Sagua la Grande, began work in a Havana printshop in 1944 and was appointed Chief Designer for Cuba's principal television station in 1959. In 1964, at the beginning of the new wave of Cuban graphic design, Mederos began creating his first posters as head of the design team of the propaganda organization Intercommunications.

In 1969 Mederos was assigned by DOR (The Department of Revolutionary Orientation) to travel to Vietnam to paint scenes of the war. He travelled to both North and South Vietnam along the Ho Chi Minh trail with the liberation forces, experiencing first-hand the brutal conditions of war and the courageous response of the Vietnamese people. The paintings were exhibited in Hanoi, and were subsequently reproduced as a screenprinted series which has been shown all over the world. Another trip in 1972 added to the body of work. Several of these images were reproduced in the United States as part of the anti-war and Cuba solidarity efforts and in Cuba as a set of postage stamps. He also contributed to the solidarity posters produced by OSPAAAL (Organization of Solidarity with the People of Asia, Africa, and Latin America) which enjoyed worldwide distribution through the magazine Tricontinental.

In 1973 Mederos created a series of vallas (12-sheet billboards) on the history of the Cuban Revolution as well as a series of screenprints commemorating the 20th anniversary of the assault on the Moncada, the event signaling the beginning of the armed resistance to the Batista government. He continued to design vallas and posters for DOR and its successor Editora Politica (EP) on a wide range of domestic and international issues.

In 1991 Mederos visited the United States for the first time, where he designed and painted a mural at UCLA on U.S.–Vietnam solidarity. His last major project was a 14-panel portable mural series on Che Guevara.

Mederos died of cancer in Havana in 1996. His style, with its bright, firmly contoured surfaces, its ebullience of patterns in nature, and a strong, political theme, established a unique standard for graphic design in Cuba which influenced a whole generation of graphic artists all over the world.

== See also ==
Slate blog post on the history of Cuba and Vietnam posters by Rene Mederos
