= Tricontinental (disambiguation) =

Tricontinental is a quarterly left-wing magazine founded after the Tricontinental Conference in 1966.

Tricontinental, Tri-continental, or Tri Continental may also refer to:

- Tri Continental Film Festival, a film festival held in Cape Town, South Africa
- Tri-Continental, a Canadian blues, folk and world music group
- Tricontinental Conference (1966), a gathering of countries from Africa, Asia, and Latin America that focused on anti-colonial and anti-imperial issues during the Cold War era
- Tricontinental: Institute for Social Research, institute in India headed by Vijay Prashad

== See also ==
- Tricontinental Chile, a geopolitical concept denoting Chile's unique position with territory over three continents
