= Jane Norling =

American artist

- Education: Bennington College
- Website: janenorling.com

Jane Norling is an American visual artist active in San Francisco Bay Area cultural venues since 1970. Her work addresses social and environmental justice and aesthetic concerns through public art, graphic design, painting, printmaking & small press publishing. She graduated from Bennington College in 1968 with a Bachelor of Arts in Visual Arts and began her career designing books at Random House before relocating to San Francisco in 1970.

== Involvement with Haight Ashbury muralists ==
In the 1970s, Norling worked as a founding member with the Haight Ashbury muralists. Her work includes the 1976 mural “Our History is No Mystery” at John Adams Community College, as well as the 1984 mural “Darles Armas Y Tambien Ensenarles a Leer” (Give Them Arms and Also Teach Them to Read), initially painted as part of the Balmy Alley Mural Project. This mural, moved from its original location but still visible from the street, depicts the Nicaraguan Literacy Campaign, launched in 1980 by the Sandinista government, reduce illiteracy and is based in part on images in photographs by Margaret Randall. The former is well documented in the film Peoples Wall, produced by the Haight Ashbury Film Collective.

== Peoples Press ==
In 1972, as a member of Peoples Press, who published the North American edition of Cuban international magazine “Tricontinental," Norling travelled to Cuba to learn from and work with the OSPAAAL design department where she designed a poster applicable to the people of Puerto Rico; this poster was printed by OSPAAAL and has become one of her most recognized social justice designs. Norling is one of eight women who designed a combined 22 posters for OSPAAAL, out of the organization's total output of roughly 326 known posters. Peoples Press was a non-hierarchical collective where design, offset small-press printing, all aspects of running a small press shop were considered equal merit, with all collective members learning all skills. In this context, individuals evolved skill in several shop jobs while maintaining awareness of every part of the process. At Peoples Press, Norling collaborated with Gail Dolgin in 1978 on a celebrated poster for International Women's Day. The design on this poster was taken from one of Norling's murals, "Sistersongs of Liberation".

== Graphic design ==
Norling has illustrated and designed logos and print materials that include California Department of Public Health worker safety projects, including pamphlets for the California Department of Industrial Relations and OLPPP. This includes the 1980 screenprint poster "La Leche Materna es la Mejor (Breast Milk is the Best)" for a Food & Nutrition Services campaign in Santa Cruz, California. This poster was reproduced by the Syracuse Cultural Workers in 1986, and was included in an exhibition on women's rights at Massachusetts College of Art and Design in Fall 2016.

== Other cultural design ==
Norling designed cover art for the 1974 Red Star Singers album, The Force of Life, released by Paredon Records (now operated as Smithsonian Folkways Recordings), as well as a poster for San Francisco Mime Troupe plays including The Mother (1973), False Promises/Nos Engañaron (1976), Hotel Universe (1977), a play based on the International Hotel struggle, and Coast City Confidential (1995).

Her political poster art was included in the 2003 exhibition One Struggle, Two Communities: Late 20th Century Political Posters of Havana, Cuba and the San Francisco Bay Area at the Berkeley Art Center. In 2011, her painting, "Absence," was included in a travelling art exhibition which marked ten years of US war against Afghanistan. This painting depicts a group of Afghan women, including one holding an empty white figure meant to signify the child she has lost in war.

== Paintings and public art installation ==
Norling's more recent work places greater focus on studio painting, specifically abstract landscapes inspired by visits to National Parks and other outdoor areas of expansive beauty. It has been included in exhibitions curated by Slate Contemporary Gallery in Oakland, CA, at Berkeley Art Center's 2013 unjuried member exhibition, Wonder, and the 2014 Feature exhibition. Her art has also been featured on the cover of Margaret Randall's 2009 publication, Their Backs to the Sea. Norling's work was commissed to be printed on glass for a major art installation at the Almeda County social services building at 1111 Jackson Street in Oakland, California; this installation was approved in October 2015, and features water-based imagery on glass on six separate sections within the building.
