= Tanks of Cuba =

Tanks have been utilized on the island of Cuba both within the military and within several conflicts, with their usage and origin after World War II; the Cold War; and the modern era. This includes imported Soviet tanks in the Cuban Revolutionary Armed Forces today as well as American and British designs imported prior to the Cuban Revolution.

== Overview ==
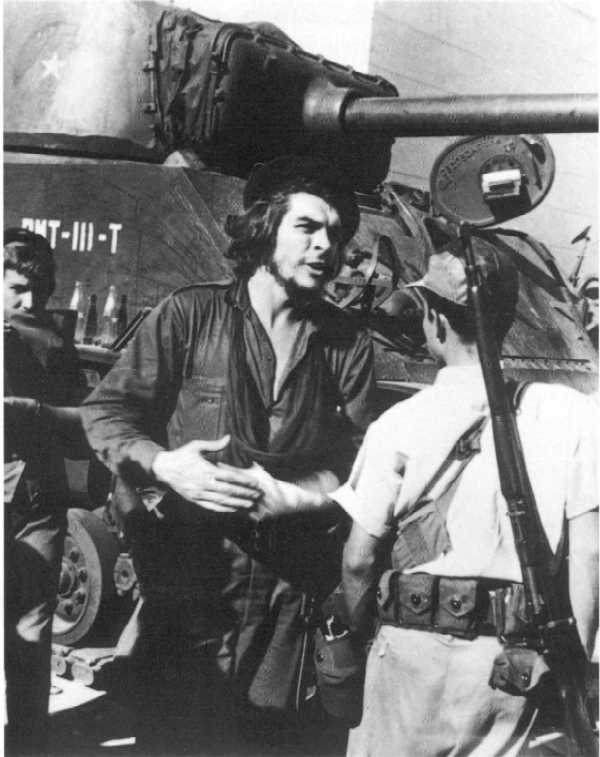
Che Guevara beside a M4 Sherman shortly after the Battle of Santa Clara.

Cuba originally had tanks from Great Britain and the United States and armored vehicles but didn't manufacture any. From these beginnings the modern Cuban Armoured forces grew and procured modern armoured fighting vehicles from Russia and Soviet Bloc that served during the Cold War, and various operations. One of the main Cuban operations using armor was in Angola in Africa.

== History ==
Cuba in 1942 received military aid through the Lend-Lease program, and received eight Marmon-Herrington tanks from the U.S. which became known in the Cuban army as the ‘3 Man Dutch’ as they had been the model of tank sent to the Dutch East Indies campaign against the Japanese invasion in World War II.

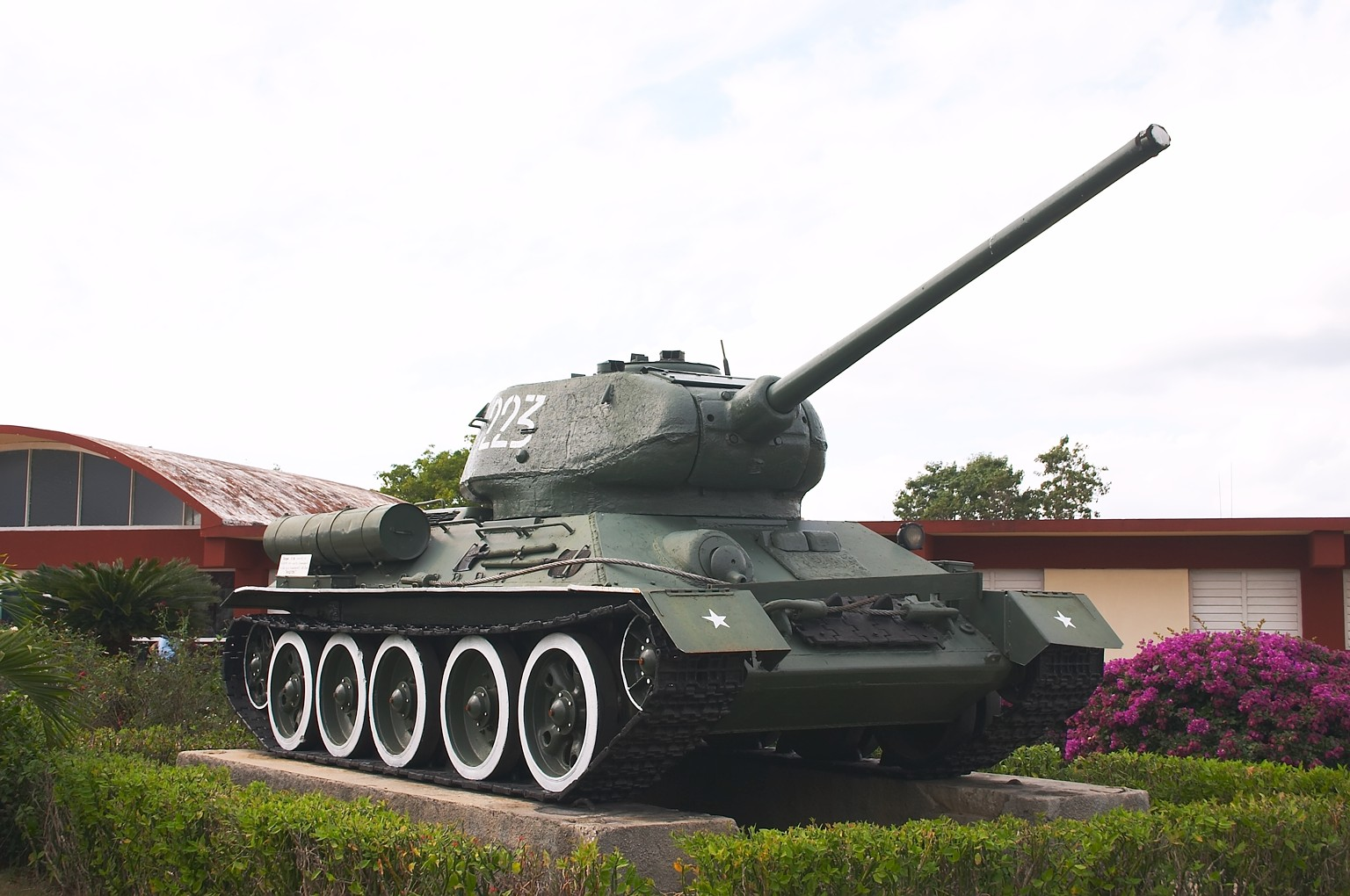
T-34-85 tank in Museo Giron, Cuba

Cuba also got M3 Stuart tanks from the United States, as 24 of these light tanks arrived at Cuba under Lend Lease in 1942-1943 after the declaration of war to Germany. Later in 1957, 7 M4 Sherman tanks were received from the United States. They participated in the fights against the 26th of July Guerrilla Movement of Fidel Castro, fighting in Oriente (offensive of May 1958, Battle of Guise) and in the Battle of Santa Clara, in support of the Regiment "Leoncio Vidal" against Che Guevara. Some of these tanks were captured by the rebels, and the Shermans were displayed by the rebels riding the tanks when they triumphantly entered Havana, with Fidel on one of them. Here, on January 1, 1959, was taken the famous photo of Che next to a Sherman which also saw action in the Battle of Santa Clara, as Batista sent 10 tanks, 12 armored cars along with an armored train and air support.

Just before the revolution, Great Britain had sent 15 A34 Comet tanks which were delivered to Cuba under Batista on 17 December 1958, and there are reports that some were used in the Battle of Santa Clara at the end of December 1958 by Batista's troops. Castro got these after he took over Cuba, and requested additional stocks of 77mm ammunition for the Comets as well as spare parts.

When Fidel Castro seized power in January 1959, five of the eight Marmon-Herrington tanks were still operational. The new communist army, FAR (Revolutionary Armed Forces), retained them and shortly thereafter these five tanks were modified the original 37mm cannon replaced by a Bofors QF 20mm gun. The development of a strong armored force that could react quickly to any threat, whether internal or otherwise was a concern even at that stage.

In October 1960, the Cuban government needed tanks for which they could get ammunition not subject to US sanctions and turned to the Soviet Union for military aid from them and was supplied with T-34/85 tanks which allowed them to build up their armored forces. So by the time of Bay of Pigs in April 1961, there were in Cuba 125 T-34-85 and also 41 IS-2M tanks that Cuba received. Some of the Sherman tanks also saw combat action against the anti-communist Cuban exiles at the Bay of Pigs (Playa Girón) along with the militia, but the majority of the tanks and armoured fighting vehicles (AFVs) the Cuban Army used at the battle were Soviet, such as the T-34/85 and the SU-100.

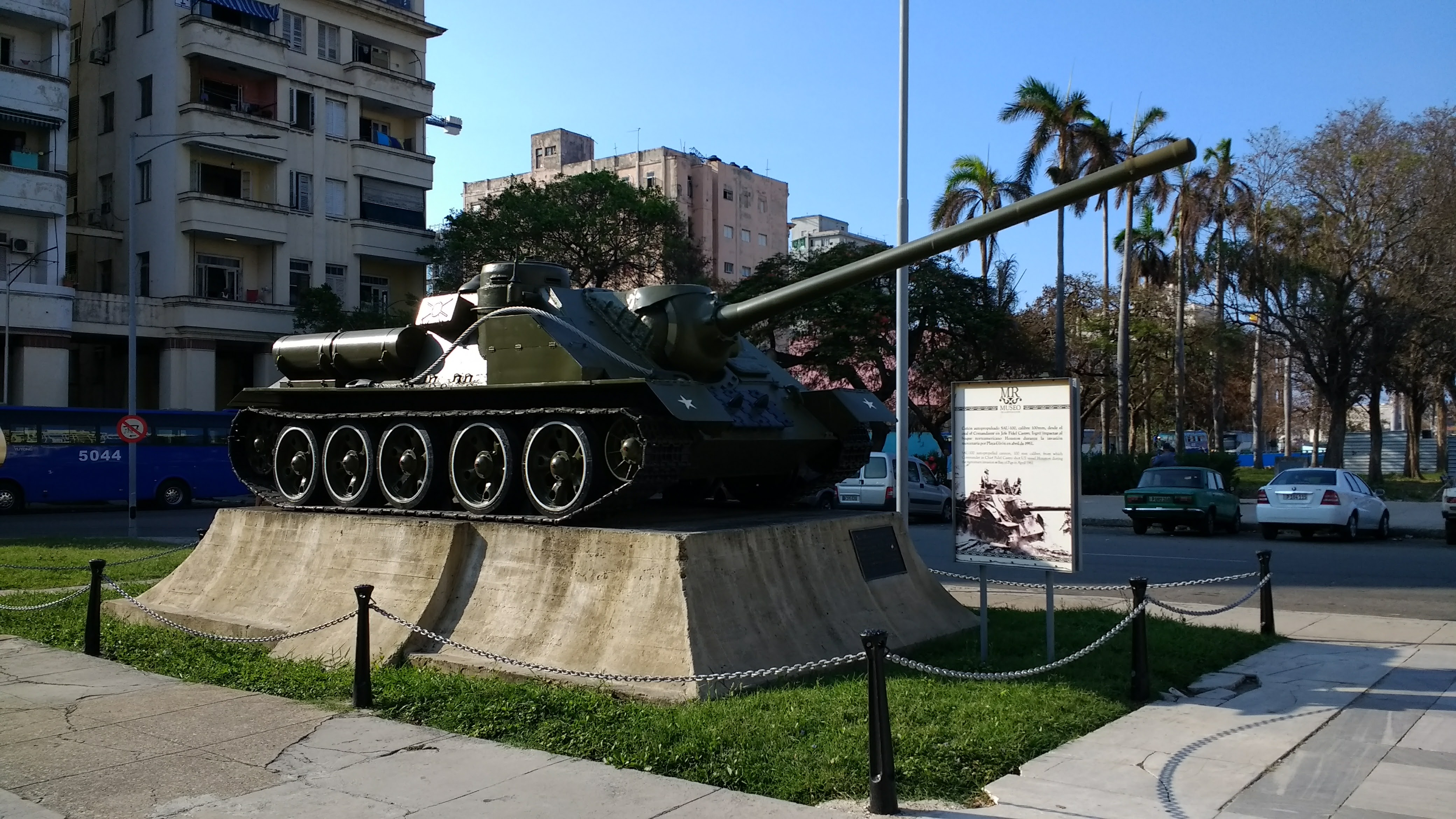
The SU-100 from which Fidel Castro reportedly shelled the freighter Houston during the morning of 17 April

The IS-2M tanks were in two regiments sent to the battle and were used as a reserve firing artillery support, while there were at least a force of 20 of the T-34-85 tanks fighting in the Bay of Pigs conflict and aided in the Cuban victory over the Brigade 2506 M41 Walker Bulldog tanks, although five T-34-85 tanks were destroyed and others severely damaged. Castro asked for more T-34-85 tanks after this to defend the island, and in September 1961 the request was up to 412 tanks, which began arriving just before the Missile Crisis.

Soon after their own revolution, many Cubans identified with the fledgling groups fighting for their independence. In Algeria, when France gave their independence, Castro decided to support them in their struggle with Morocco in the Sand War. Castro was determined to prevent American domination and formed the Grupo Especial de Instrucción to use whose forces included twenty-two T-34-85 tanks, eighteen 120-mm mortars, a battery of 57-mm recoilless rifles, anti-aircraft artillery with eighteen guns, and eighteen 122mm field guns with the crews to operate them. They were described as an advisory contingent to train the Algerian army, but Castro allowed deployment in combat actions. Castro tried keep Cuba's intervention covert, but word of their presence soon leaked out.

In 1961 the Cuban Military began to provide support for the left wing MPLA movement in a civil war. The Angolan War of Independence was a struggle for control of Angola between guerilla movements and Portuguese colonial authority. Castro had become familiar with the MPLA soon after it began, and after he came to power, Cuba had trained some of its guerrilla fighters, and Che Guevara had also made contact with its leaders.

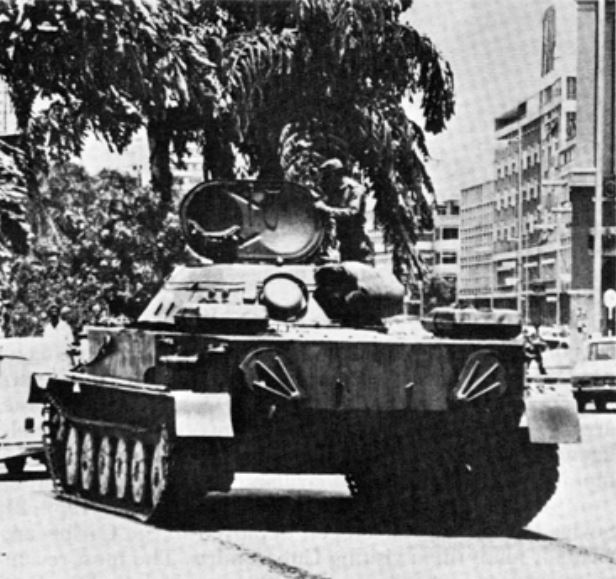
Cuban PT-76 tank in the streets of Luanda, 1976.

So when Portugal left, Cuba sent advisors to help the MPLA and they quickly found themselves in the conflict when they lost men in the Battle of Quifangondo on 10 November 1975, the day before the People's Movement for the Liberation of Angola (MPLA) declared Angola's independence from Portugal. Cuba supplied the People's Movement for the Liberation of Angola (MPLA) rebels with weapons and soldiers along with tanks to fight as the Cuban military would fight alongside the MPLA in major battles.

The arrival of the T-55 tanks in 1963 allowed Castro to send many of the older T-34-85 tanks to the conflict in Angola in 1975. All of the T-34s in Angola were armed with a ZiS-S-53 85mm main gun and two 7.62mm DT machine guns, with estimates as high as 200 T-34s used during the conflict. The T-34-85 tanks participated in Angola including the Battle of Cassinga where a Cuban mechanized battalion with T-34 tanks, and BTR-152 armoured personnel carriers were nearly destroyed, losing a half-dozen T-34s with another three heavily damaged. Cuba also received T-54s along with the T-55s, which formed the backbone of more than a thousand tanks that Russia would provide.

Russian T-62s arrived in Cuba in 1976, and by November 1987, shipments of T-54/55s were sent to Angola to replace the tanks lost. The assistance to the MPLA escalated till Cuban military aid helped the MPLA emerge victorious. Cuban T-62s along with T-55s and T-54Bs, were deployed to Angola during Havana's lengthy intervention in that country.

The more ubiquitous T-55 was favoured for combat duty, and during the Battle of Cuito Cuanavale only a single battalion of Cuban T-62s took part in the fighting. The Cuban tanks clashed with defending South African armoured units at Cuamato and again at Calueque without sustaining serious losses.

== Organization of armored forces ==
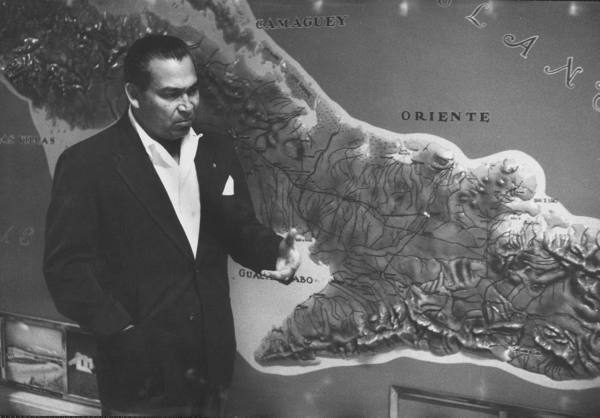
Batista in March 1957, standing next to a map of the Sierra Maestra mountains where Fidel Castro's rebels were based

Fidel Castro ousted Batista on 31 December 1958, replacing his government with a revolutionary socialist state. Castro set up the Ministry of the Revolutionary Armed Forces of Cuba (MINFAR) to oversee the Communist Party of Cuba and the government, as well as the Cuban Revolutionary Armed Forces (Fuerzas Armadas Revolucionarias – FAR). In the immediate aftermath of the revolution, Castro's government began a program of nationalization and political consolidation that transformed Cuba's economy and society. He also reformed many aspects of Cuba's military and political organizations along communist lines, such as the 26 July Movement becoming the Communist Party in October 1965, and making a people's militia called the National Revolutionary Militia (MNR) as well as building the military which had the armored forces. It was the MMR which first engaged the counter-revolutionary force at the Bay of Pigs, with the tanks being sent once the regular army was sent by Castro.

As he consolidated his government, Castro built up the number of tanks for the army. Cuban armored forces were organized at first to defend the revolutionary socialist state, and later enable intervention in foreign military conflicts. Military schools were founded for infantry, tank, artillery and communications training as well as reorganizing and expanding the regular Army at the expense of the common people in the MNR militia. The best of the militia members were transferred to the regular Army and armored forces, and in 1963 the militia was changed to a new military reserve organization, the Popular Defense Forces. Then after the defeat of counter-revolutionary forces in the mountains in 1965, the Popular Defense Forces were made into the Civil Defense headed by Raúl Castro. Then in 1980 the Territorial Troops Militia was created, composed exclusively of civilian volunteers, which backed up the army while the Civil Defense focused on natural disasters relief.

The regular army with its armored forces has been involved in training others or foreign intervention with considerable Soviet military assistance. It reached its peak in 1975, with three armored divisions with over 1000 tanks, and 15 infantry divisions. In offensive action in these interventions, tanks, reconnaissance armored vehicles, armored personnel carriers and artillery pieces of the first echelon unit normally attack using Soviet military doctrine, which if defending the tanks are dug in with the armored units and soldiers, while the heavy artillery forms up behind to support them.

== Overview of tanks ==
=== Light and medium tanks ===
Name	Country of origin	Quantity	Notes
Marmon-Herrington Combat Tank	United States	8	

Name	Country of origin	Quantity	Notes
Light Tank M3	United States	5	

Name	Country of origin	Quantity	Notes
M4	United States	15	

Name	Country of origin	Quantity	Notes
A34	United Kingdom	5	

Name	Country of origin	Quantity	Notes
T-34-85	Soviet Union	150	
PT-76	Soviet Union	50	

=== Heavy tanks ===
Name	Country of origin	Quantity	Notes
IS-2Ms	Soviet Union	41	

=== Main battle tanks ===
Name	Country of origin	Quantity	Notes
T-54/55	Soviet Union	800	T-55Ms active
T-62	Soviet Union	380	T-62Ms active

== See also ==
- History of the tank
- Tanks in World War II
- Tank classification
- List of military vehicles
- Cuban military ranks
- Cuban intervention in Angola
- Cuban Revolutionary Air and Air Defense Force
- Cuban Revolutionary Armed Forces
- List of wars involving Cuba
- Military interventions of Cuba
