= Empire of Liberty =

Foreign policy created by Thomas Jefferson

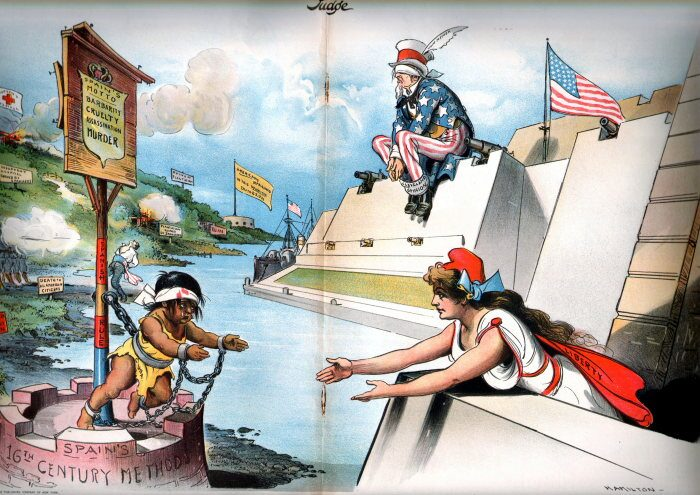
Columbia (the American people) reaches out to help oppressed Cuba in 1897 while Uncle Sam (the U.S. government) is blind and does not use its great firepower. Judge magazine, Feb. 6, 1897

The Empire of Liberty is a theme developed first by Thomas Jefferson to identify what he considered the responsibility of the United States to spread freedom across the world. Jefferson saw the mission of the U.S. in terms of setting an example, expansion into western North America, and by intervention abroad. Major exponents of the theme have been James Monroe (Monroe Doctrine), Andrew Jackson and James K. Polk (Manifest Destiny), Abraham Lincoln (Gettysburg Address), Theodore Roosevelt (Roosevelt Corollary), Woodrow Wilson (Wilsonianism), Franklin D. Roosevelt, Harry Truman (Truman Doctrine), Ronald Reagan (Reagan Doctrine), Bill Clinton, and George W. Bush (Bush Doctrine).

In the history of U.S. foreign policy, the Empire of Liberty has provided motivation to fight the Spanish–American War (1898), World War I (1917-18), the later part of World War II (1941–1945), the Cold War (1947–1991), and the war on terror (2001–present).

== Thomas Jefferson ==
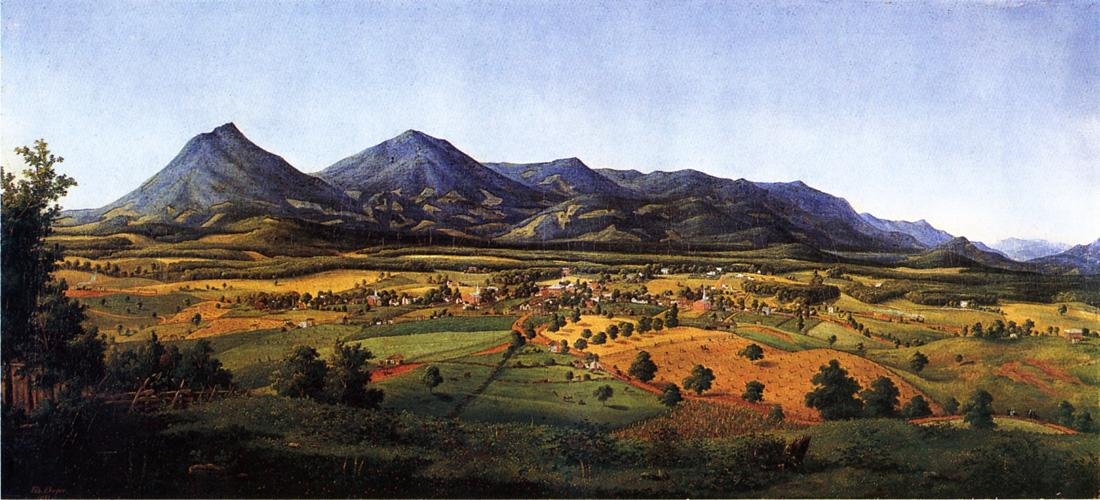
View of Liberty, Bedford County, Virginia (1855), Edward Beyer

Jefferson used this phrase "Empire of Liberty" in 1780, while the American revolution was still being fought. His goal was the creation of an independent American state that would be proactive in its foreign policy while ensuring that American interventionism and expansionism would always be of a benevolent nature:

We shall divert through our own Country a branch of commerce which the European States have thought worthy of the most important struggles and sacrifices, and in the event of peace [ending the American Revolution]...we shall form to the American union a barrier against the dangerous extension of the British Province of Canada and add to the Empire of Liberty an extensive and fertile Country thereby converting dangerous Enemies into valuable friends.

— Jefferson to George Rogers Clark, 25 December 1780

Jefferson envisaged this "Empire" extending westwards over the American continent, expansion into which he saw as crucial to the American future. During his presidency, that was in part achieved by his 1803 Louisiana Purchase from the French, which almost doubled the area of the republic and removed the main barrier to westward expansion. He stated, "I confess I look to this duplication of area for the extending of a government so free and economical as ours, as a great achievement to the mass of happiness which is to ensue".

However, he thought that it would not necessarily be a politically-unified empire: "Whether we remain in one confederacy, or form Atlantic and Mississippi confederacies, I believe not very important to the happiness of either part." Despite this, Jefferson on other occasions seemed to stress the territorial inviolability of the Union.

In 1809, Jefferson wrote his successor, James Madison:

we should then have only to include the North [Canada] in our confederacy...and we should have such an empire for liberty as she has never surveyed since the creation: & I am persuaded no constitution was ever before so well calculated as ours for extensive empire & self government.

— Jefferson to James Madison, 27 April 1809

Even in his later years, Jefferson saw no limit to the expansion of the empire and wrote that "where this progress will stop no-one can say. Barbarism has, in the meantime, been receding before the steady step of amelioration; and will in time, I trust, disappear from the earth".

While Jefferson spoke loftily and idealistically about an Empire of Liberty abroad, he also envisioned creating a new form of American imperialism closer to home. The scholar Richard Drinnon observed that Jefferson spoke of establishing more amicable relations with Native Americans on America's Western Frontier at his "second inaugural address". During this address, Drinnon claims that Jefferson was quoted as stating that "humanity enjoins us to teach them (the Native Americans) agriculture and the domestic arts". In practice, however, Jefferson's imperial policy and implementation of the ideal of an Empire of Liberty for North America's Native Americans was radically different. In Drinnon's view, there was a vast disparity between Jefferson's ideas and his actual actions. According to Drinnon, "Jefferson had initiated the Indian removal policy through his energetic efforts to "obtain from the native proprietors the whole left bank of the Mississippi."

One major reason that the lands of the aboriginal inhabitants had been so drastically reduced was Jefferson's acquisition of a hundred million acres in treaties shot through with fraud, bribery, and intimidation. Also, when Natives interfered with white definitions of the national interest, as for the Northwestern "backward" tribes in 1812, Jefferson's humanitarianism hardened: "These will relapse into barbarism and misery, lose numbers by war and want," he grimly predicted to John Adams, "and we shall be obliged to drive them, with the beasts of the forest into the Stony mountains.".

Jefferson was not the only founding father to refer to an American empire in their writings. Alexander Hamilton also envisioned an American empire that would eventually surpass that of the British Empire superpower. In 1795, Hamilton once wrote of America as the, "embryo of a great empire." In The Farmer Refuted (1775), Hamilton predicted that, "in fifty or sixty years America will be in no need of protection from great Britain... She will have a plenty of men and a plenty of materials to provide and equip a formidable navy. She will indeed owe a debt of gratitude to the parent state, for past services; but the scale will then begin to turn in her favour, and the obligation, for future."

== Monroe Doctrine ==
The Monroe Doctrine, an American foreign policy initiative introduced in 1823, stated that efforts by European countries to colonize or interfere with counties in the Americas will be viewed as acts of aggression requiring U.S. intervention, and the Americans also promised to refrain from interfering the affairs of established European colonies and to respect the control of the European nations over their Caribbean colonies. The doctrine's justification was to make the "New World" safe for liberty and American-style republicanism, but many countries in Latin America have viewed the doctrine as simply justification for the United States to establish imperialistic relations with the region without having to worry about European interference. The Monroe Doctrine was invoked during the Second French intervention in Mexico and with the German Empire during the Zimmermann Telegram affair in 1917. After 1960, the Monroe Doctrine was invoked for a rollback of communism from its new base in Fidel Castro's Cuba. American President Ronald Reagan emphasized the need to roll back communism in Nicaragua and Grenada.

== Reforming the world ==
American Protestant and Catholic religious activists began missionary work in "pagan" areas from the 1820s and expanded operations worldwide in the late 19th century.

European nations (especially Britain, France, and Germany) also had missionary programs, which focused mostly on subjects within their own empires. Americans went anywhere it was possible, and the Young Men's Christian Association (YMCA) and Young Women's Christian Association (YWCA) were among the many groups involved in missionary work. Others included the student volunteer movement and the King's Daughters. Among Catholics, the three Maryknoll organizations were especially active in China, Africa, and Latin America.

Religious reform organizations joined in attempts to spread modernity and worked to fight the corrupting effects of ignorance, disease, drugs and alcohol. For example, the World's Woman's Christian Temperance Union (WWCTU), a spinoff of the WCTU, had both strong religious convictions and a commitment to international efforts to shut down the liquor trade. By the 1930s the more evangelical Protestant groups redoubled their efforts, but the more liberal Protestants had second thoughts about their advocacy, especially after the failure of prohibition at home cast doubt on how easy it might be to reform the world.

== Other dimensions ==
Economic dimensions of the Empire of Liberty involved dissemination of American management methods (such as Taylorization, Fordism, and the assembly line), technology, and popular culture such as film.

In the 1930s, the Congress passed the Neutrality Acts, which attempted to avoid entering in conflicts with other nations. The United States became involved in World War II two years after its start.

Left-wing writers ooften capitalized on anti-imperialistic ideals by using the label American Empire in as a criticism of the United States foreign policy as imperialistic. Noam Chomsky and Chalmers Johnson are prominent spokesmen for this position, having long been critical of American imperialism. Their argument is that an imperialistic America represents an evil imperialism, which is indeed the very thing that the "Empire of Liberty" was conceived to counter. They recommend an alternate course of "dismantling the empire" by which the United States foreign policy is moved in a different direction. The Puerto Rican poet and novelist Giannina Braschi proclaimed the collapse of the World Trade Center as the end of the American Empire and its "colonial" hold on Puerto Rico in her work United States of Banana (2011).

== See also ==
- American exceptionalism
- American imperialism
- Christian mission
- Civilizing mission
- Liberal internationalism
- White man's burden
- Exporting the revolution
  - Cuban military internationalism
  - Exporting the Islamic Revolution, foreign policy of Iran
  - Sister republic, foreign policy of revolutionary France
  - World revolution, concept in Marxism
