= Latin American Solidarity Organization =

Socialist Chilean Organization

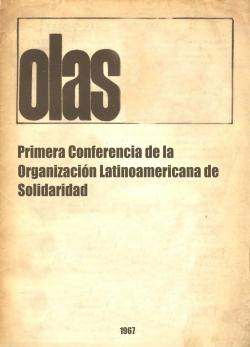
First Conference of the Latin American Solidarity Organization, 1967

The Latin American Solidarity Organization (in Spanish: Organización Latinoamericana de Solidaridad; in Portuguese: Organização Latino-Americana de Solidariedade), or simply OLAS, was an organization created in August 1967 in Cuba on the initiative of Salvador Allende (who would later go on to become president of Chile), composed of several revolutionary and anti-imperialist movements in Latin America that, to a greater or lesser extent, shared the strategic proposals of the Cuban Revolution. The organization's motto was "The duty of every revolutionary is to make the revolution".

== History ==
The proposal to create OLAS came about after the success of the Primera Conferencia Tricontinental de Solidaridad Revolucionaria (First Tricontinental Conference on Revolutionary Solidarity) held in January 1966, in which more than five hundred delegates from revolutionary organizations from Asia, Africa and Latin America gathered. The conference took place years after the Cuban Missile Crisis, and the aim was to expand the fight against US imperialism and expand the revolution. The said conference would be held by the Soviet Union to present itself as an ally of the Third World and thus neutralize Chinese influence, although the Cuban confrontational position against US imperialism was eventually strengthened.

In its first statement, OLAS took stock of the strategies applied so far and clearly opted for armed struggle and guerrilla warfare as a mechanism to extend the revolution to all of Latin America. The doctrine defended in OLAS implied the integration of the revolutionary forces not only of the working classes but also of the peasantry and students, dismissing the elections as a waste of time. In this way, Havana's role in Latin America was reinforced and consolidated, as reported by the press of the time: “Havana is now the capital of the new international that will process Latin American liberation”.

However, the death of Che Guevara in Bolivia, a few weeks after the conference, thwarted the organization's project to coordinate the Andean countries with the different existing guerrilla movements and create new ones, thus making it impossible to fulfill the proposed objective.In the 1970s, OLAS had become a center for the dissemination of struggles without real coordination capacity.

== See also ==
- OSPAAAL
- Revolutionary Coordinating Junta
