= World revolution =

Marxist concept of overthrowing capitalism

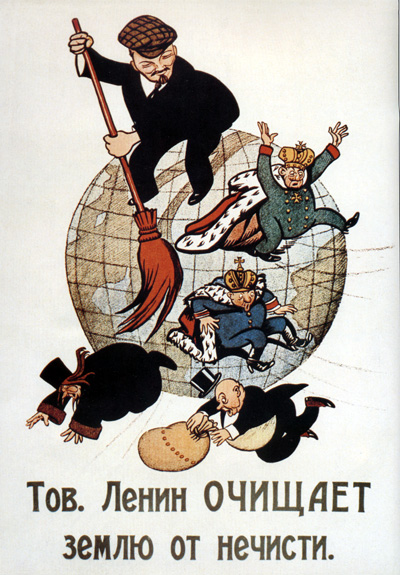
"Comrade Lenin Cleanses the Earth of Filth" (1920)

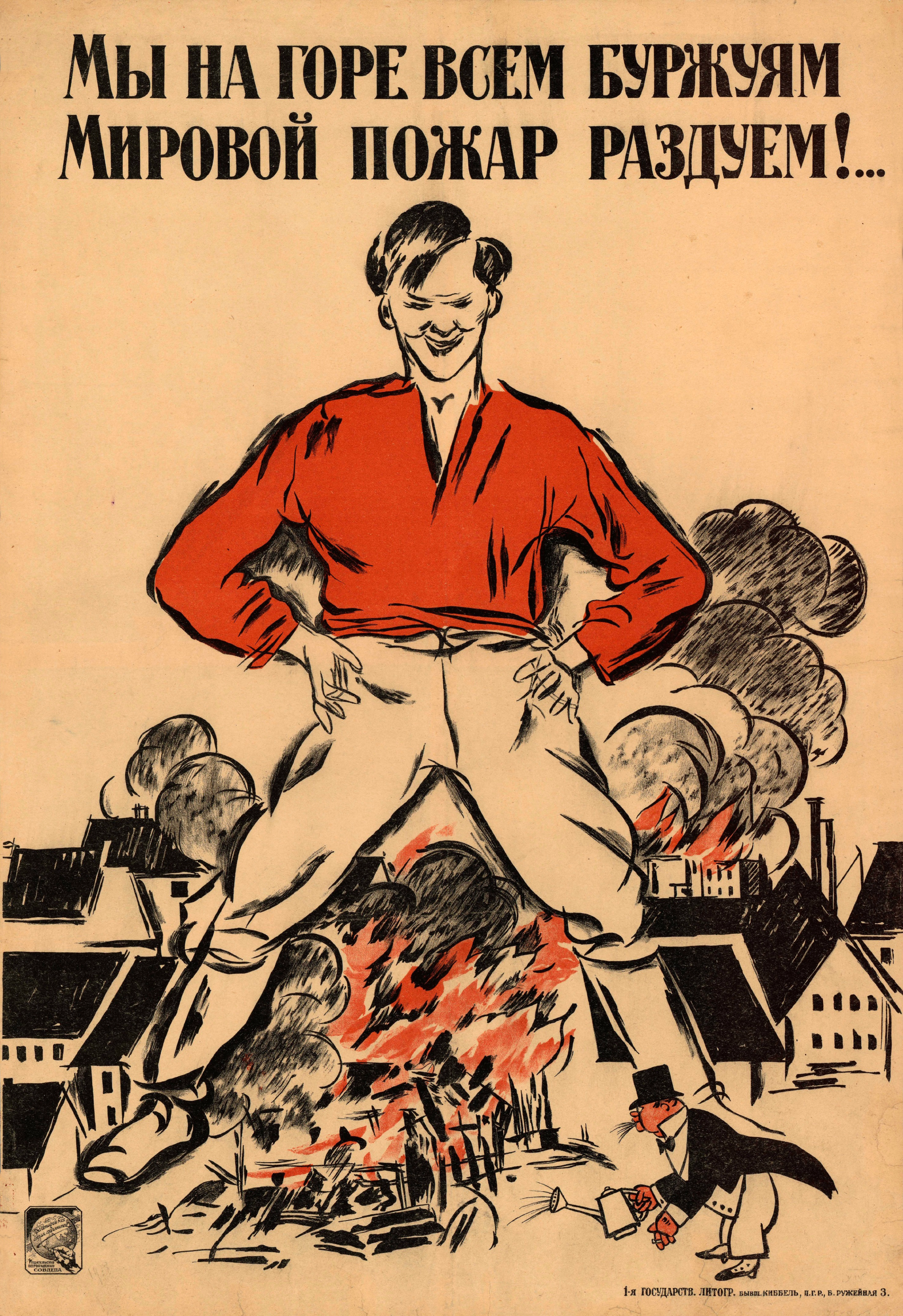
"To the grief of all the bourgeois we'll fan a worldwide conflagration!", a 1918 Soviet poster with the words from the poem The Twelve by Alexander Blok (artist Alexander Zelenskiy)

World revolution is the Marxist concept of overthrowing capitalism in all countries through the conscious revolutionary action of the organized working class. For theorists, these revolutions will not necessarily occur simultaneously, but where and when local conditions allow a revolutionary party to successfully replace bourgeois ownership and rule, and install a workers' state based on social ownership of the means of production. In many Marxist schools, such as Trotskyism and communist left, the essentially international character of the class struggle and the necessity of global scope are critical elements and a chief explanation of the failure of socialism in one country.

The end goal of such internationally oriented revolutionary socialism is to achieve world socialism, and later, a communist society.

== Communist movements ==
The Russian Revolution of 1917 in Russia sparked a revolutionary wave of socialist and communist uprisings across Europe, most notably the German Revolution, the Hungarian Revolution, Biennio Rosso, and the revolutionary war in Finland with the short lived Finnish Socialist Workers' Republic, which made large gains and met with considerable success in the early stages;.

Particularly between 1918 and 1919, it seemed plausible that capitalism would soon be swept from the European continent forever. Given the fact that European powers controlled the majority of Earth's land surface at the time, such an event could have meant the end of capitalism not just in Europe, but everywhere. Additionally, the Communist International (Comintern), founded in March 1919, began as an independent international organization of communists from various countries around the world that evolved after the Russian Civil War into an essentially Soviet-sponsored agency responsible for coordinating the revolutionary overthrow of capitalism worldwide.

Revolutions are the locomotives of history.

— Karl Marx

With the prospect of world revolution so close at hand, Marxists were dominated by a feeling of overwhelming optimism, which in the end proved to be quite premature. The European revolutions were crushed one by one, until eventually the Russian revolutionaries found themselves to be the only survivors. Since they had been relying on the idea that an underdeveloped and agrarian country like Russia would be able to build socialism with help from successful revolutionary governments in the more industrialized parts of Europe, they found themselves in a crisis once it became clear that no such help would arrive;.

The power struggle in the Soviet Union which emerged during Lenin's illness and eventual death would also determine the prospect of world revolution. In particular, the leadership of the German Communist Party had requested that Moscow send Leon Trotsky to Germany to direct the 1923 insurrection. However, this proposal was rejected by the Politburo which was controlled by Stalin, Gregory Zinoviev, and Lev Kamenev who decided to send a commission of lower-ranking Russian Communist Party members. According to historian Isaac Deutscher, Trotsky had explicitly supported world revolution through proletarian internationalism but opposed the means through military conquest as seen with his documented opposition to the war with Poland in 1920, proposed armistice with the Entente and temperance with staging anti-British revolts in the Middle East.

After those events and up until the present day, the international situation never came quite so close to a world revolution again. As fascism grew in Europe in the 1930s, instead of immediate revolution, the Comintern opted for a popular front with liberal capitalists against fascism; then, at the height of World War II in 1943, the Comintern was disbanded on the request of the Soviet Union's Western allies.

Draft program of the Communist Youth International, adopted at its 3rd Congress (partial)

The liberation of humanity from the yoke of capitalism has become the immediate combative task of the international proletariat. The proletariat must overthrow the power of the bourgeoisie, establish the dictatorship of the proletariat and Soviet power, expropriate the land, banks, transport, and industry from the capitalists, and proceed along this path toward the complete abolition of private property and classes, and the creation of a communist economic system and society.

The material prerequisites for the world revolution are present; its victory depends only on the will to fight and the strength of the proletariat.

Only when the proletariat has finally freed itself from reformist illusions, has broken with the bourgeoisie’s allies in the camp of the Second International, and begins the struggle under the leadership of the communist parties and the Third Communist International — the revolutionary leader and representative of the working masses of the entire world — only then is the victory of the proletarian revolution possible.

The essential condition for the establishment of proletarian power is to win the majority of the working class to the foundations and aims of communism. In the struggle for its dictatorship, the proletariat, under the leadership of the communist party, employs methods of mass revolutionary action (demonstrations, the factory-committee movement, strikes [partial and general], production control, factory seizures, armed uprisings, etc.).

It utilizes bourgeois-democratic institutions (parliaments) in its struggle, seeking to dislodge capitalism from its positions on all issues of the daily life of the working class, undermining and exploding these institutions from within.

— "Коминтерн и идея мировой революции". pp.561-562. (in Russian) Наука. 1998. ISBN 5-02-009623-7

=== After World War II ===
A new upsurge of revolutionary feeling swept across Europe in the aftermath of World War II, though it was not as strong as the one triggered by World War I that resulted in a failed socialist revolution in Germany and a successful one in Russia. Communist parties in countries such as Greece, France, and Italy had acquired significant prestige and public support due to their leadership of anti-fascist resistance movements during the war; as such, they also enjoyed considerable success at the polls and regularly finished second in elections in the late 1940s. However, none managed to finish in first and form a government.

For communist parties in Eastern Europe, meanwhile, though they did win elections at around the same time, Western media criticized the lack of liberal democratic elements in their rise to power. Nonetheless, communist movements in Eastern Europe proliferated, even with some local cases independent of the USSR, such as the Yugoslav Partisans led by the future leader of Yugoslavia Josip Broz Tito, who had led the struggle against fascism and Axis occupation during World War II.

Student and worker revolts across the world in the 1960s and early 1970s, coupled with the Chinese Cultural Revolution, the establishment of the New Left together with the civil rights movement, the militancy of the Black Panther Party and similar armed/insurrectionary "Liberation Front" groups, and even a bit of a resurgence in the labor movement for a time once again made it seem to some as though world revolution was not only possible, but imminent.

However, this radical left spirit ebbed by the mid-1970s. In the 1980s and 1990s, there was a return to right-wing, economically conservative ideologies (spearheaded, among other examples, by Thatcherism in the United Kingdom and Reaganomics in the United States) and free-market reforms in China and in Vietnam.

The seeming triumph of neoliberalism as the sole world-ideology led some liberal and conservative writers, such as Francis Fukuyama to write, as in his work The End of History and the Last Man, that although Marxist and Hegelian theory was correct in that dialectical materialism had led to an ideal society, this society was in fact late-twentieth century liberalism, and that there would be no further political change beyond the confines of capitalism and liberalism for the foreseeable future. Indeed, according to Marxist literary critic Terry Eagleton this acknowledgement of the fundamental reliability (though tweaked) of Marxist theory, yet the denial of its global applicability in the face of ascendant Reaganite and Thatcherite dogma, led to a contradiction at the heart of society in the 1980s and 1990s:

One might have thought that if Marxism was true in 1975, as many then claimed it was, then – short of some immense sea-change in the world itself – it would also have been true in 1985. But in 1985 it was mattering less whether it was true or not, just as the existence of God was a burning issue in 1860 but hardly so a century later. Marxism was now less a disconcerting challenge than the irritating or endearing idiosyncrasy of those unable to relinquish an imaginary selfhood inherited from the past. It belonged irrevocably to the great epoch of modernity, within which, whether true or false, it figured as an entirely intelligible project. Once that age had passed into a different problematic, Marxism could be seen as at best a set of valid responses to a set of questions which were no longer on the agenda. It thus crossed over, in the eyes of some, from being false but relevant, to true but superfluous.

Within Marxist theory, Vladimir Lenin's concept of the labor aristocracy and his description of imperialism, and – separately, but not necessarily unrelatedly – Trotsky's theories regarding the deformed workers' state, offer several explanations as to why the world revolution has not occurred to the present day. Many groups still explicitly pursue the goal of worldwide communist revolution, calling it the truest expression of proletarian internationalism.

In a 1936 interview with journalist Roy W. Howard, Stalin articulated his rejection of world revolution and stated that "We never had such plans and intentions" and that "The export of revolution is nonsense".

== See also ==
- Exporting the revolution
  - Cuban military internationalism
  - Empire of Liberty, theme in American foreign policy
  - Exporting the Islamic Revolution, foreign policy of Iran
  - Sister republic, foreign policy of revolutionary France
  - World communism
- Liberal internationalism
- Democracy promotion
- Communist revolution
- Permanent revolution
- Proletarian internationalism
- Revolutionary wave
- Stateless communism
- Social patriotism
- Workers of the world, unite!
