= Tricontinental Conference (1966) =

Political meeting in Cuba

First Tricontinental Conference Primera Conferencia Tricontinental Première conférence tricontinentale المؤتمر الثلاثي القارات الأول
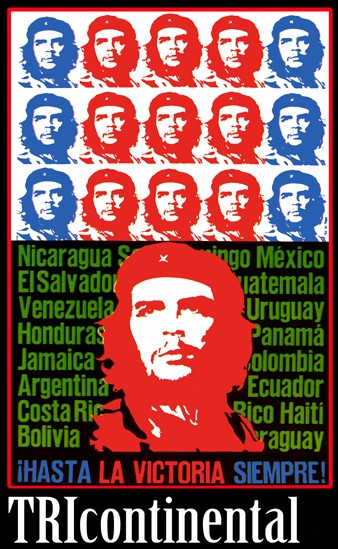
- Tricontinental Conference poster
- Host country: Cuba
- Dates: 3 to 16 January 1966
- Cities: La Havana
- Participants: 500 delegates from 82 countries
- Chair: Fidel Castro

Key points
- Revolutions in Asia, Africa and Latin America; Globalization and neocolonialism Vietnam War; Civil rights in the US; Apartheid in South Africa and Rhodesia; National question of Puerto Rico; Establishment of OSPAAAL

The Tricontinental Conference was a gathering of countries that focused on anti-colonial and anti-imperial issues during the Cold War era, specifically those related to Africa, Asia, and Latin America. The conference was held from 3rd to 16th January 1966, in Havana, Cuba, and was attended by roughly 500 delegates from 82 countries. It founded the Organization of Solidarity with the People of Asia, Africa and Latin America (OSPAAAL). The key issues discussed at the conference were countries that were in the midst of revolutions, with a specific focus on Cuba and Vietnam.

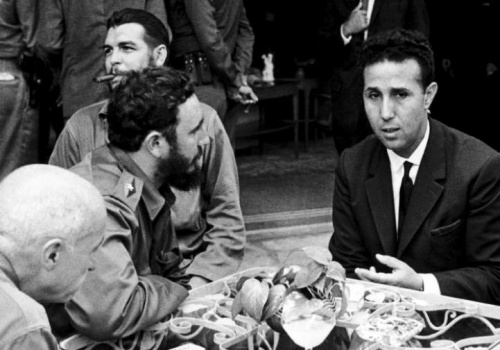
Ahmed Ben Bella and Fidel Castro meeting in Cuba

== Background ==
In 1965, Algerian revolutionary Ahmed Ben Bella attempted to hold an Afro-Asian solidarity conference in Algiers. This, however, was prevented due to his overthrow and the bombing of the meeting hall. The attempt was fulfilled in 1965 when Mehdi Ben Barka, an exiled Moroccan opposition leader, brought together both legal and illegal revolutionary organizations from all over the world to partake in this conference, which took place in Havana at the Chaplin Theatre. The Tricontinental Conference was an extension of both the Bandung Conference (1955) and the UN Conference on Trade and Development (1964). Bandung marked the emergence of a non-aligned movement and the building of a Third World anti-imperialist project, but the Tricontinental revolutionized liberation struggles by emphasizing violent action over non-violent action. Ben Barka was in charge of inviting various organizations and groups and made arrangements for their travel. While organizing the conference, Ben Barka initially chose Geneva as the city in which the conference was to occur because of its ideal position for communication and for distributing funds throughout the world. In October 1965, Barka was abducted in Paris by two French police officers, who sent him to the Moroccan Minister of Interior and Intelligence, General Oufkir. Details of his imprisonment and death are unclear, since he was never heard from again and did not attend the conference. Following Barka’s abduction, the location of the conference was moved to Havana.

The goal of the Tricontinental Conference was to merge Afro-Asian solidarity with Latin American solidarity and to develop a communist organization with the goal of international revolution. It was one of the largest gatherings of anti-imperialists in the world. In comparison to the Bandung Conference, the Tricontinental conference was more radical in its attempt to pose a challenge to capitalism. The conference resulted in the condemnation of imperialism, colonialism, and neo-colonialism. One of the key topics discussed at this Conference was the involvement of the United States in Vietnam, which participants took to be an indication of American imperial aggression towards former colonies. Many delegates pushed for more collaboration, support, solidarity, and demonstrations of revolutionary internationalism.

== Attendees ==
The Tricontinental Conference brought together around 500 delegates from the various liberation movements of 82 different countries. Though the full guest list was never published by the conference managers due to security concerns, a US Staff Report compiled out of anxiety over the communist nature of the participants succeeded in naming all delegates and involved countries. The Tricontinental was the first to include a strong Latin American presence, and the first to emphasize the political alignment of the three continents of Africa, Asia, and Latin America.

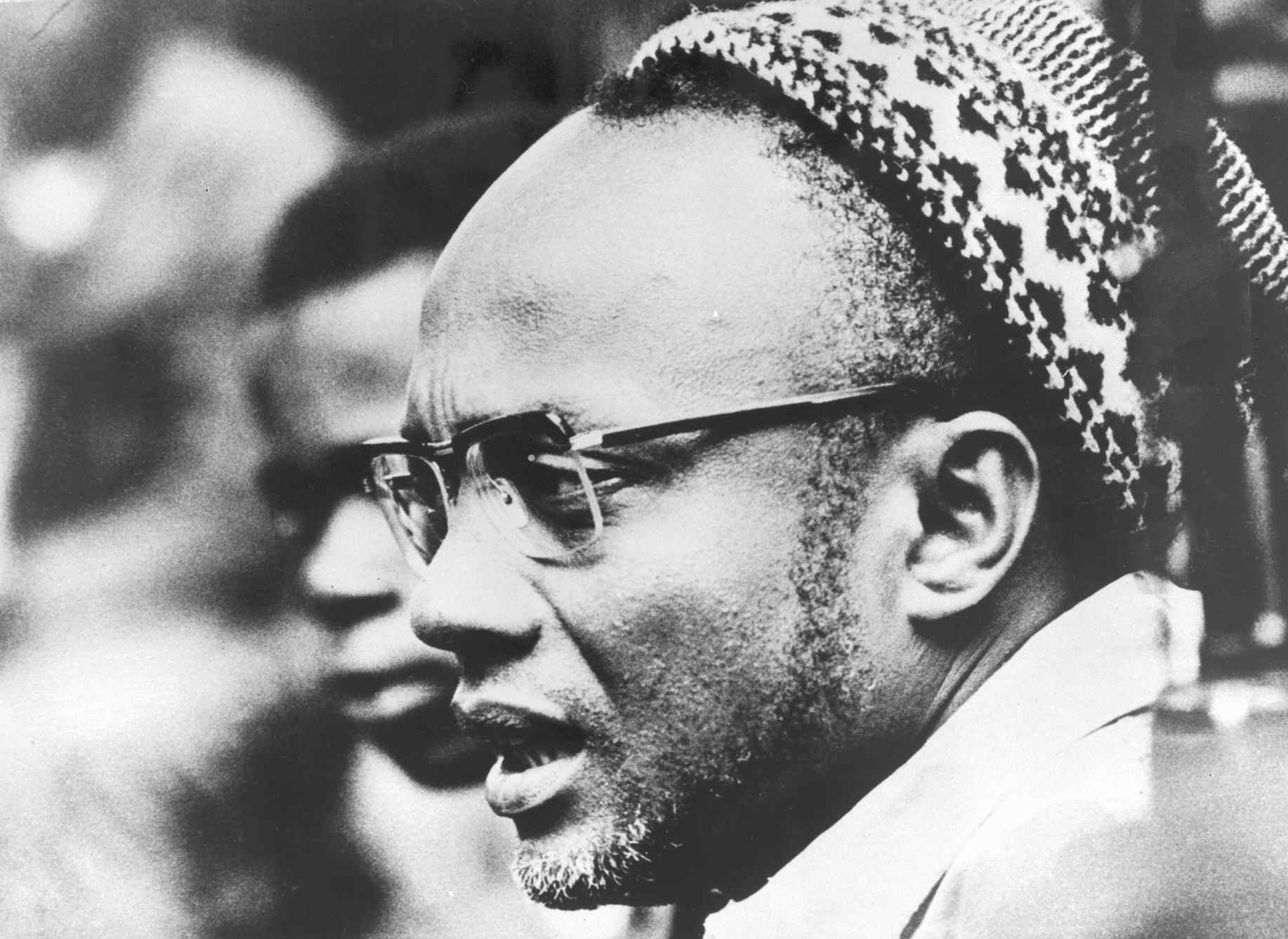
Bissau-Guinean anti-colonial leader Amílcar Cabral

Notable conference attendees included anti-colonialist Amílcar Cabral of Guinea-Bissau and Nguyen Van Tien, the representative of the National Liberation Front of South Vietnam. Other prominent figures included Fidel Castro, the Prime Minister of Cuba; Salvador Allende, at that time a Senator and president of the Chilean senate and later the President of Chile; and Asela de los Santos, one of the founder members of the Communist Party of Cuba. Notable absentees included Che Guevara, who, while fighting in Bolivia, sent a letter to be read to the delegates on his behalf; and Mehdi Ben Barka, the intended Chairman of the conference, whose disappearance two months prior sparked deep anti-imperialist tones during the event.

Some recorded participants were::

Cuba

Guatemala

China

Dominican Republic

USSR

Rhodesia

== Agenda ==
=== Content of the Conference ===
Discussion at the conference centered on tricontinental integration, with emphasis on anticolonialism, anti-imperialism, revolutionary internationalism, and overall collaboration and support in these areas. Attending delegates had been brought together with the common goals of resistance to colonialism and imperialism, in addition to the establishment of an alliance across colonial national boundaries. Ideological formations, namely pan-Africanism and pan-Arabism, were further established at the conference to address the political fragmentations resulting from colonialism. Some delegates requested military and diplomatic support from other participants in their revolutionary and anti-colonial pursuits. Delegates also called for the removal of foreign military bases on the three continents and the ending of military pacts. The general consensus at the conference was notably anti-nuclear, in which delegates demanded the prohibition of various aspects of the usage and storage of nuclear weaponry and the dismantling of existing nuclear weaponry. However, the general declaration of the conference emphasized that the shared enemy of Asia, Africa, and Latin America was, without a doubt, American imperialism and interventionism.

Map of the States Participating in the Non-Aligned Movement which sought a ban on all nuclear weaponry

Plenary sessions began on the morning of January 4 and for the next two days, each delegation chairman spoke to a full assembly. These delegates included Amilcar Cabral, Salvador Allende, and Luis Augusto Turcios Lima. Delegates were divided into individual committees where each worked on drafting resolutions. During the final few days of the conference, a plenary session was held where the final resolutions were declared and adopted by the attendees. One of the major goals of the conference was for the delegates to create a common strategy that they would commit to follow in order to fight against imperialism. The conference was also a way for the delegates to coordinate and increase the sense of solidarity between Asia, Africa, and Latin America. In creating close military ties and solidarity, the conference advocated a global militant resistance, one that was more radical and more open to violence than the Bandung Conference. The spirit of the conference was one characterized by third-world unity and revolutionary fervor. At his closing speech at the conference, Fidel Castro made the promise of Cuban aid to any revolutionary movement on any continent. He also emphasized the need for coordination among all revolutionary movements to combat perceived imperial domination.

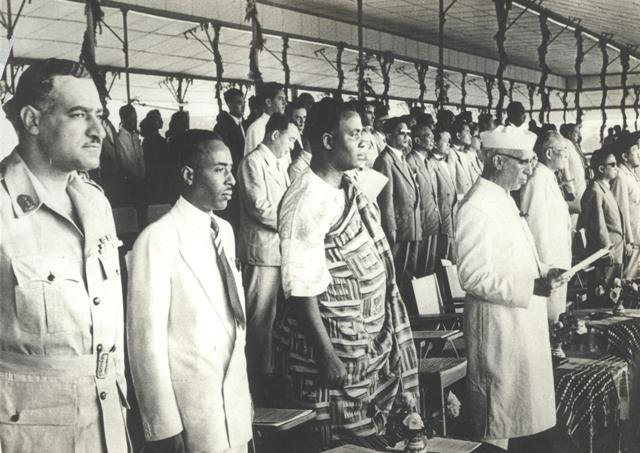
Delegates meeting at the Bandung Conference in April 1955

Racial discrimination, both within the United States and in developing nations, was an important issue discussed by delegates, with a focus on the South African apartheid regime. Edward Ndlovu of the Zimbabwe African People's Union accused Britain of supporting the illegal government of Rhodesia. Che Guevara, who was not present at the conference, sent a message condemning British colonialism in Rhodesia and the white minority in southern Africa and denouncing the apartheid regime.

Delegates at the Tricontinental Conference not only condemned colonialism and imperialism; they also broadened the scope of their movement by explicitly stating their unity with movements within the United States, such as the Civil Rights movement. For the Tricontinental delegates, the United States was the prime instigator of imperialist aggression, and they believed the Civil Rights movement to be a crucial component of their cause.

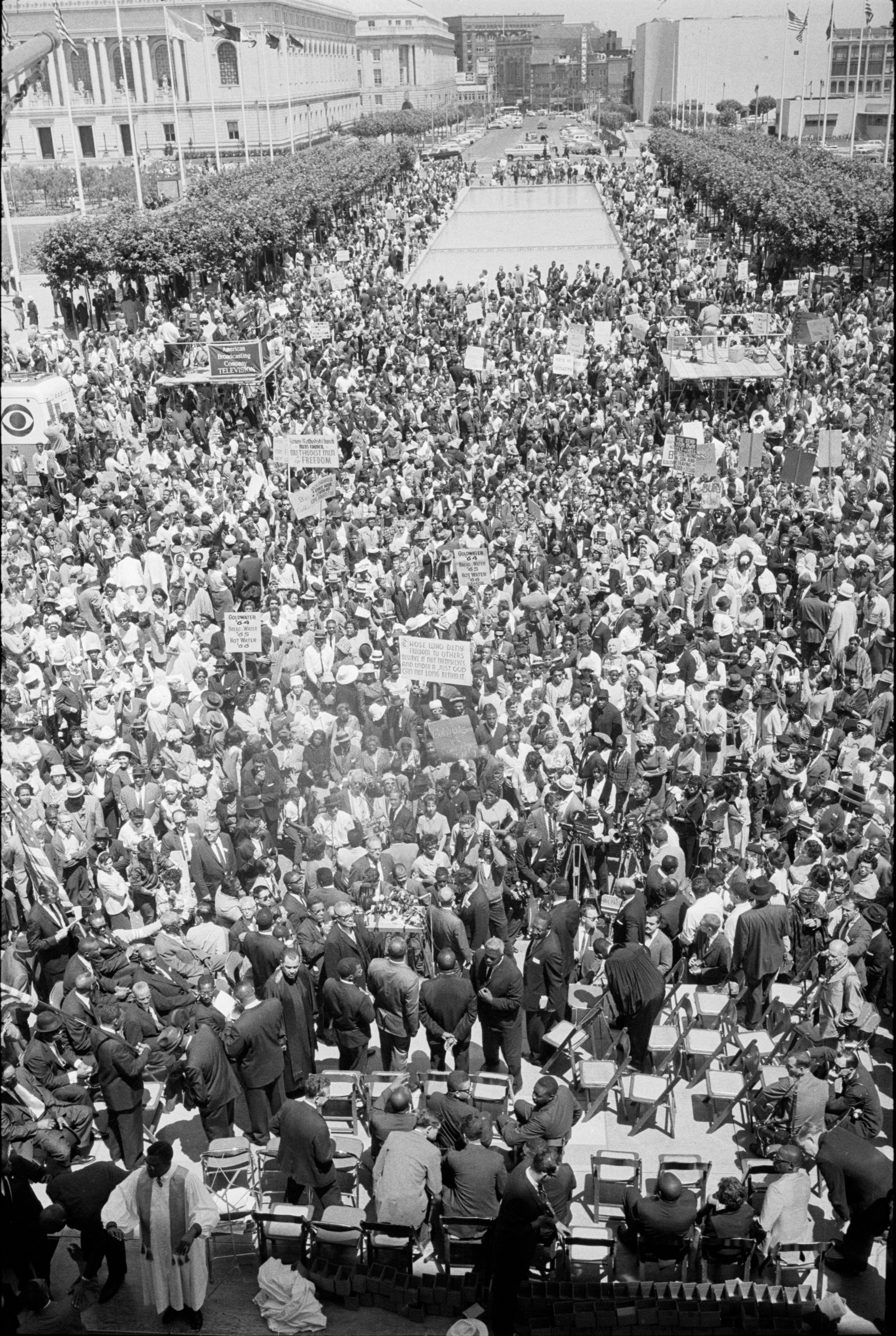
Civil rights activists marching in 1964

In addition to national liberation and anti-imperialist struggles as being main issues on the agenda, delegates also discussed and debated models of economic development. During the conference, economic planning that prioritized nation development was emphasized in order to minimize economic ties to the West. Delegates agreed that such nation-building projects would be focused on accomplishing equality and social justice through radical measures, particularly through agrarian reform. In addition, delegates at the conference reached a consensus that the political and economic relations between Africa, Asia, and Latin America would be premised on the principles of equality and mutual interest, where no state would advance their own interests at the expense of another. In terms of international economics, the conference envisioned a new economic policy that saw the Global South as one entity; delegates agreed that the financial relationship with the West would no longer be subject to one-sided development needs. Instead, negotiations were viewed as an action undertaken collectively, based on the idea that the development of individual nations would be strongly connected to the overall development of the Global South. The Tricontinental Conference re-imagined a world characterized by cooperation and solidarity across the Global South.

=== American Intervention in Vietnam ===
The American intervention in the Vietnam War was a major topic during the conference. All participants condemned the American war in Vietnam as imperialist and aggressive and further emphasized their support and solidarity with the Vietnamese. Nguyen Van Tien, the representative of the National Liberation Front of South Vietnam, requested support at the conference for the Vietnamese people against the Americans. Tran Danh Tuyen, the North Vietnamese representative, also proposed a resolution that the US end its war in South Vietnam unconditionally, stop bombing North Vietnam, withdraw American troops and arms from South Vietnam, dismantle military bases in South Vietnam, and respect Vietnamese sovereignty. The support and solidarity that Vietnamese resistance against US imperialism garnered during the conference were apparent in the pledge of “unrestricted support” to the Vietnamese by Cuban president Osvaldo Dorticos and Dominican representative Cayetano Rodriguez del Prado’s pledge to revolutionize the Dominican Republic into “the Vietnam of Latin America.” The idea of Vietnam as a model for other countries struggling against colonialism, neo-colonialism, and imperialism, particularly American imperialism, was a major theme throughout the discussions of the conference. Though not present at the Tricontinental Conference, Che Guevara sent a letter to be read at the conference in which he called for “two, three, many Vietnams” as a way to fight imperialism in the global south.

=== Dispute over OSPAAAL Headquarters location ===
One area of conflict involved the question of where the headquarters of OSPAAAL, the organization that emerged from the Tricontinental, would be located after the conference. The Chinese delegation wished to maintain their influence in AAPSO (Afro-Asian People's Solidarity Organization) and so pushed for the headquarters to be located in Havana and wanted OSPAAAL and AAPSO to remain two separate organizations. On the other hand, the Cuban delegation argued that there should be one, unified organization headquartered in Havana. The Soviets also wanted a single organization but with its headquarters in Cairo. However, the Chinese delegation threatened dissension if Cairo became the headquarters. In the end, the Chinese delegation emerged victorious as the delegates agreed to AAPSO as a separate organization and instead constructed a new Tricontinental organization, headquartered provisionally in Havana. The final decision made was that the final structure of OSPAAAL would be decided at a second Tricontinental conference in Cairo in 1968.

=== Resolutions adopted ===
By the end of the conference, delegates adopted the following resolutions:

- The peoples of Africa, Asia, and Latin America would respond to imperialist actions with revolutionary fervor and violence to ensure their continued independence and to help liberate other countries that are currently fighting against colonialism.
- The imperialist policies of the United States, which are viewed as an act of military aggression against Asia, Africa, and Latin America, would be denounced.
- The Cuban blockade would be condemned.
- The occupation of Puerto Rico by the United States would be condemned.
- Consensus was reached that imperialist actions perpetrated by the United States were the foundation of continued oppression because they perpetuated a global structure that upheld exploitation.
- Unity was expressed with the armed struggles occurring in Colombia, Peru, Venezuela, and Guatemala.

== Legacy ==
The revolutionary nature of the three continents gathered to confront American imperialism cemented the Tricontinental Conference’s place in the history of global independence struggle. Several countries achieved independence as a result of the solidarity demonstrated at the Tricontinental Conference between former colonies, notably as a result of the Cuban commitment to anti-imperialist struggle.

=== Organization of Solidarity with the People of Asia, Africa and Latin America (OSPAAAL) ===
The organization known as OSPAAAL emerged after the conclusion of the conference with the intent to extend its influence into the future. OSPAAAL was a manifestation of the values established by the Tricontinental, namely anti-imperialism. It supported liberation and human rights struggles worldwide, including those that found themselves within the sphere of capitalist influence, such as the Civil Rights Movement in the United States. The organization developed two publications, the Tricontinental Bulletin and the Tricontinental Magazine, to spread propaganda and to maintain contact with its various delegations. The Bulletin included updates and commentary on ongoing independence movements worldwide and also produced propaganda posters, found within its pages, for distribution. Meanwhile, the magazine offered a more in-depth analysis of conflicts and also distributed speeches and essays written by leading revolutionaries, such as Che Guevara and Amilcar Cabral. The organization closed its doors in 2019.

=== US Reaction ===
Since the impulse behind the Tricontinental Conference was to establish solidarity between the countries of the Global South impacted by imperialism, the conference explicitly targeted the United States in its anticolonial rhetoric. The conference took place during the international political turmoil of the Cold War—four years after the Cuban Missile Crisis and several months after the first American foot soldiers invaded Vietnam in 1965. The United States was sensitive to countries that adopted Communist policies and sought to prevent what it perceived as the spread of Soviet influence. The Tricontinental Conference was the first coordination of activists from all three continents directly impacted by American foreign policy and therefore constituted a threat in the minds of American government officials.

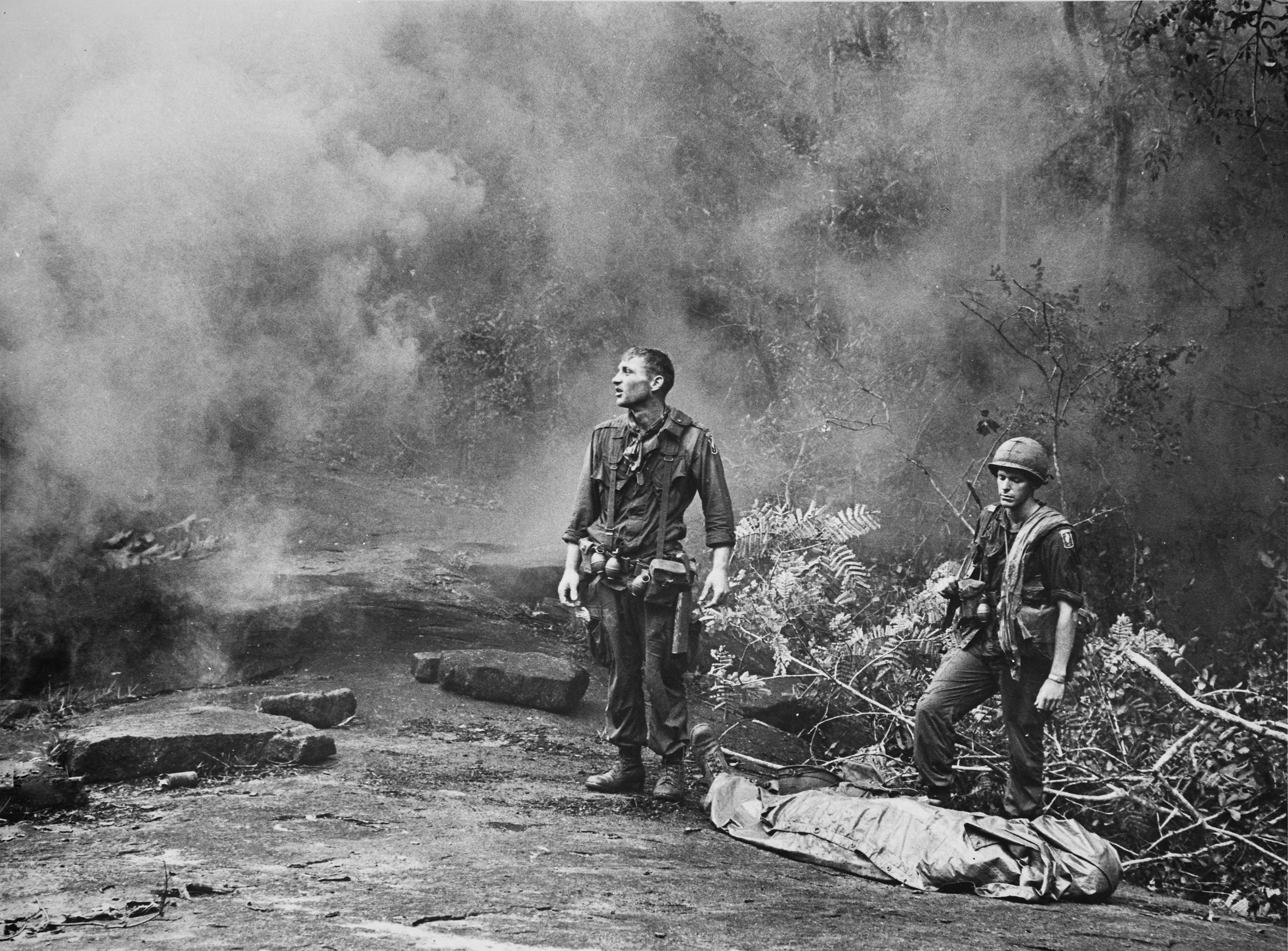
Fallen Soldier at Long Khanh Hill in Vietnam, 1966

In response to the Tricontinental Conference and its revolutionary ideas, the United States engaged in its own effective counter-revolutionary behavior via the Central Intelligence Agency. Although the United States already had a history of anti-Communist intervention, the Tricontinental was seen as a collective reaction from former colonies, unmatched in history, that seemed to require more radical methods of repression. The United States undertook this challenge, allegedly calling upon the CIA to clandestinely assassinate potential dissidents. These included, most notably, Che Guevara in 1967.

=== New International Economic Order ===
Because the solidarity demonstrated by the delegates at the Tricontinental included military and financial support for revolutionaries, the conference could not be perceived on the same scale as previous conferences. Washington officials, therefore, considered the meeting a direct threat to America security, a reaction that stemmed partly from the sheer proximity of Cuba to the North American continent. This perceived threat manifested economically as well as militarily in a New International Economic Order (NIEO). The NIEO was proposed after the Tricontinental Conference with the intention of nation-building in the Global South separate from Western influence. It sought to increase the price of raw materials exported out of developing countries, such that the neocolonial practices of former Western colonizers were thwarted. This suggestion for economic reform was not explicitly tied to the Tricontinental Conference, emerging instead out of the 1973 Non-Aligned Movement (NAM) summit, but it built on values and priorities established during the conference. It was campaigned for by Cuba and involved many of the same countries present at the conference. During the 1980s debt crisis that affected many of the Tricontinental delegate countries, NIEO lost the momentum it had gathered after the conference.

=== Latin American failed revolutions ===
Although it stood for the human and sovereign rights of the Global South, many Latin American countries, concerned about American aggression, condemned the conference and lodged a formal letter with the UN expressing their anxieties over the interventionist stance of the conference. Tricontinental support for Black Americans undertaking their own revolutionary struggle on American soil also presented a conflict with the United States that worried Latin American political activists about possible American retaliatory intervention.

The impact of the Tricontinental conference on anti-imperialist revolution is difficult to ascertain. The Tricontinental was unsuccessful in revolutionizing the world against imperialism; its foremost influence manifested in the increased energy for liberation struggles in the Third World, but with varying results. In Latin American countries, such as Peru, Venezuela, Guatemala, and Nicaragua, the Tricontinental Conference and its message sparked revolutionary activity, but these were often initially unfulfilled in the 1970s. Latin American countries such as these would achieve peace in later decades when they could not claim to have been influenced by the Tricontinental Conference

=== African issues ===
In contrast to Latin America, the African continent saw revitalized liberation struggles as a result of the Tricontinental Conference that were more successful. Of these, the Angolan Civil War and the closely connected South African Border War, in which thousands of Cuban soldiers contributed to eventual Namibian independence, were most influenced by Tricontinental commitments. In Southern Africa, the Tricontinental financial pledges toward global liberation struggles came to fruition (Barcia 213). Cuba contributed thousands of soldiers and military resources to the left leaning People’s Movement for the Liberation of Angola (MPLA). Subsequent revolutions in Mozambique, Guinea-Bissau, and Zimbabwe achieved independence in the late 1970s and early 1980s.

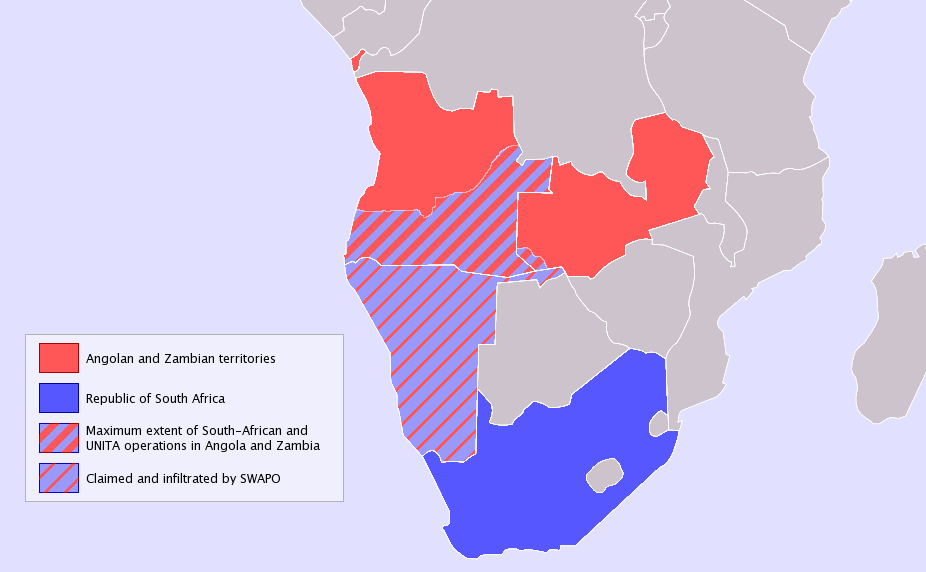
Map of the South Africa Border War

Members of the conference were particularly vocal against South African apartheid. Cuba’s mission in Angola saw confrontation between Cuban troops and South African troops. Because Cuba’s action led to eventual Angolan and Namibian independence, it reduced South Africa’s sphere of influence and political power in the region, contributing to the destabilization of the apartheid regime.

=== International legacy ===
In the 1950s, philosophies of peaceful resistance still operated in many countries seeking independence from colonizers, but the Tricontinental, influenced by the Vietnam War and Algerian War, marked the transition to violent liberation struggles. For Cuba, the Tricontinental also presented an opportunity to position itself on the world stage as a country firmly supportive of anti-colonialism. This was not necessarily a Communist position, although it opposed American capitalist interventionism, but a strictly anti-imperialist one that committed to supporting resistance struggles financially and militarily, as it did in Angola. The spirit of the Tricontinental prevailed throughout the 1970s but began to lose momentum in the 1980s. The debt crisis that began in the 1980s and affected developing countries, particularly in Latin America, provoked the dissolution of the Tricontinental solidarity that had previously united those countries. Liberation movements grew less necessary with the achievement of independence and the leftist superpower that was the USSR drew closer to collapse, leaving former Tricontinental delegates purposeless and without global support.

== See also ==
- Non-Aligned Movement
- Third-worldism
- Organization of Solidarity with the People of Asia, Africa and Latin America
- New International Economic Order
- Che Guevara
- Bandung Conference
- Vietnam War
- Algerian War
- Amílcar Cabral
- South African Border War

== Bibliography ==
- Barcia, Manuel (2009-09-01). "'Locking horns with the Northern Empire': anti-American imperialism at the Tricontinental Conference of 1966 in Havana". Journal of Transatlantic Studies. 7 (3): 208–217. doi:10.1080/14794010903069052. ISSN 1479-4012. S2CID 144602640.
- Hanna, Lani (2020-01-01). "Tricontinental's International SolidarityEmotion in OSPAAAL as Tactic to Catalyze Support of Revolution". Radical History Review. 2020 (136): 169–184. doi:10.1215/01636545-7857344. ISSN 0163-6545. S2CID 213832931.
- Mahler, Anne G. (2018). From the Tricontinental to the Global South: Race Radicalism, and Transnational Solidarity. Durham: Duke University Press. pp. 70–82.
- Mahler, Anne Garland (2015). "The Global South in the Belly of the Beast : Viewing African American Civil Rights through a Tricontinental Lens". Latin American Research Review. 50 (1): 95–116. doi:10.1353/lar.2015.0007. ISSN 0023-8791. JSTOR 43670233. S2CID 143288352.
- Moreno, Jose A.; Lardas, Nicholas O. (1979). "Integrating International Revolution and Detente: The Cuban Case". Latin American Perspectives. 6 (2): 36–61. doi:10.1177/0094582X7900600204. S2CID 145020505.
- "The Tri-Continental Conference and the Ben Barka Affair". NACLA.
- Obregón, L. (2017). Bandung, Global History, and International Law: Critical Pasts and Pending Futures. Cambridge: Cambridge University Press. pp. 232–246.
- Stanley, Issac (2019). Dreaming Revolution: Tricontinentalism, Anti-Imperialism and Third World Rebellion. London: Routledge. pp. 153–167.
- "Tricontinental Conference". www.latinamericanstudies.org.
- Vélez, Federico (2017). Latin American Revolutionaries and the Arab World : From the Suez Canal to the Arab Spring. Routledge. doi:10.4324/9781315563077. ISBN 978-1-315-56307-7.
- Young, Robert J. C. (2005). "Postcolonialism: From Bandung to the Tricontinental". Historein. 5: 11–21. doi:10.12681/historein.70. ISSN 2241-2816.
- Young, Robert J. C. (2018). "Disseminating the Tricontinental". The Routledge Handbook of the Global Sixties. Routledge Handbooks Online. pp. 517–547. doi:10.4324/9781315150918-48. ISBN 978-1-138-55732-1.
- "Legacies of the Tricontinental Conference | Tricontinental Conference".
