= Tricontinental =

Magazine

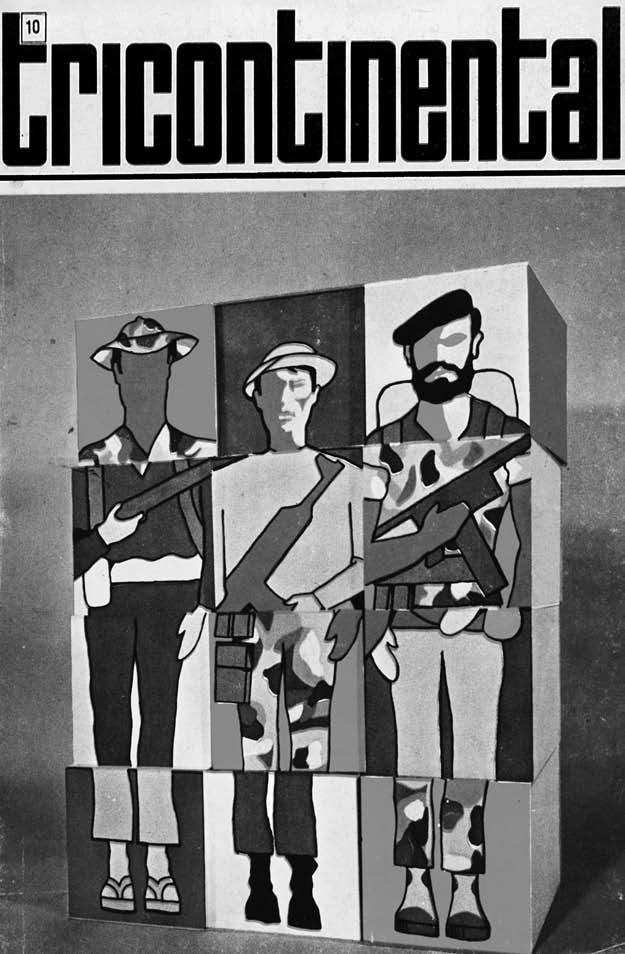
- Cover of the 10th issue, 1969
- Categories: Political magazine
- First issue: 1967
- Language: English, Spanish, Portuguese
- Website: https://thetricontinental.org/

The Tricontinental is a quarterly political magazine, founded after the Tricontinental Conference 1966. The magazine is the official publication of the Organization of Solidarity with the People of Asia, Africa and Latin America (OSPAAAL), which published it until 2019. The magazine is focused on left-wing politics, Third World solidarity, and anti-imperialism.

== History ==
The Tricontinental debuted in August 1967. Folded propaganda posters were included in individual copies; it ceased publication after the dissolution of the Soviet Union in 1991, when the Cuban economy experienced rapid economic recession, and the continued publication of the magazine became economically infeasible. The publication also suffered from ink shortages.

Tricontinental returned in 1995. In 2000, the decision was made to begin to reprint posters. Production of these materials ceased with the OSPAAAL's closure in 2019.

The magazine is distributed around the world, and at its height, 87 countries received Tricontinental, involving more than 100,000 subscribers, mostly students. At one time, Tricontinental posters were often posted on the walls of student community centres.

== See also ==
- Towards the Third Cinema, a manifesto published in 1969 by Tricontinental
- Tricontinental: Institute for Social Research
