= Organization of Solidarity with the People of Asia, Africa and Latin America =

Cuban political movement

- Organización de Solidaridad de los Pueblos de Asia, África y América Latina
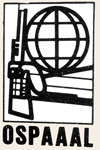
- Abbreviation: OSPAAAL
- Formation: January 3, 1966; 60 years ago
- Headquarters: Havana, Cuba

The Organization of Solidarity of the Peoples of Asia, Africa and Latin America (Spanish: Organización de Solidaridad de los Pueblos de Asia, África y América Latina), abbreviated as OSPAAAL, was a Cuban political movement with the stated purpose of fighting globalisation, imperialism, neoliberalism, and defending human rights. The OSPAAAL was founded in Havana in January 1966, after the Tricontinental Conference, a meeting of over 500 delegates and 200 observers from over 82 countries.

Acting as the "key bridge" to unite liberation struggles and movements in the three continents, OSPAAAL's main objective is the promotion of anti-imperialism. The Organization of American States (OAS) called OSPAAAL "the most dangerous threat that international communism has yet made against the inter-American system".

OSPAAAL's motto was "This great humanity has said: enough! And has started to move forward".

Until 2019, it published the magazine Tricontinental as their main transnational communication tool. After the closing of OSPAAAL by the Cuban Government, the Tricontinental Institute for Social Research seeks to continue the heritage of the Tricontinental conference and the organization. They "stand, in the words of Frantz Fanon, with the wretched of the earth to create a world of human beings."

== History and context ==
The OSPAAAL was born out of the Tricontinental Conference in Havana, which Mehdi Ben Barka was preparing before his October 1965 assassination. OSPAA gathered for the first time in Cairo, Egypt in 1957. 500 delegates from 35 countries represented their national liberation movements and parties rather than states. It was led by Ismaël Touré, the brother of Ahmed Sékou Touré, president of Guinea. Ismaël Touré presided the board responsible of the solidarity funds, assisted by two vice-chairmen: Mehdi Ben Barka of Morocco and Zhu Ziqi of the People's Republic of China. At that time, AAPSO (Afro-Asian People's Solidarity Organisation) was debating the inclusion of Cuba and the rest of the Caribbean and Latin America to the group, a question posed again in Cairo in June 1961 by the new commission, the Commission on Neocolonialism, which was presided by Ben Barka.

We are following the heroic example of Comandante Ernesto "Che" Guevara.

— Venezuelan delegate at the first Tricontinental Conference in 1966.

While the Casablanca Group, founded in 1961, gathered "progressive states" (Egypt, Ghana, Guinea, Mali, Libya, and Morocco), the OSPAAL was an organization of movements, which aimed at creating national economic development plans for the newly independent states and to break national isolation through internationalism. In exile, Ben Barka resided there six months in 1964. Amílcar Cabral, Malcolm X, and Che Guevara lived in the city around that time. Henri Curiel was there organizing "solidarity networks," which trained African National Congress activists. (The ANC had been prohibited in 1960, and Curiel would be murdered in 1978). Ben Barka was going to create an anti-colonialist magazine titled The African Review, but he decided to enlarge the union to Latin America.

After the failed Bay of Pigs Invasion in 1961, Fidel Castro moved even closer to the Soviet Union. In February 1962, Cuba was expelled from the Organization of American States (OAS). On October 3, 1965, Ben Barka declared in a press conference prior to the Havana conference that the "two currents of the world revolution would be represented there: the current born with the October Revolution and the national liberation revolutions' currents."

The fourth congress of the OSPAA, in Accra from May 6 to May 9, 1965, finally agreed on including Latin America and to take in account the founding January 1966 conference in Havana. In July, Medhi Ben Barka, who was presiding the preparatory council, assured the support of the People's Republic of China and the Soviet Union, and defined the objectives of the new organization, summed up as "total liberation:" aid to national liberation movements (in particular to the Palestinian movement), intensification of violent and peaceful struggles on all three continents, support to the Cuban Revolution, suppression of foreign military bases, support of the nuclear disarmament option, and opposition to apartheid and racial segregation. In September, Ben Barka went to Havana to prepare the opening up of the conference on January 3, 1966. However, on October 29, 1965, he was disappeared in Paris, allegedly abducted by Moroccan secret agents. The Havana Conference thus took place without him, and the OSPAAAL was officially founded.

== Activities ==
OSPAAAL cultivated relationships with international trade unions and solidarity groups around the world. OSPAAAL had a working relationship with the Movement for Colonial Freedom (MCF) a London-based transnational solidarity group. Their communication with Barbara Haq, General Secretary of MCF, included sending posters and published materials in exchange for annual reports and publications from MCF.

Due to the tension caused by US imperialism in Southeast Asia, the OSPAAAL Executive Secretariat urgently calls on the peoples and governments of the socialist countries, the progressive and peace- and justice-loving countries and the entire US people and their progressive leaders to reinforce their solidarity and support for the peoples of Viet Nam [sic], Laos and Cambodia, struggle vigorously for an end to the blockade of North Vietnamese ports and of all warlike acts by US air and naval forces against the Indochinese peoples

— OSPAAAL Executive Secretariat, 1972

As part of the campaign efforts of OSPAAAL the Executive Secretariat released official declarations about international anti-colonial struggles. Their strong opposition to US President Nixon’s military actions during the Vietnam War, such as the total blockade of the ports of the Democratic Republic of Vietnam in Operation Pocket Money, lead to them to denounce him as ‘the unscrupulous assassin of millions of Vietnamese; he is as dangerous as the fascist Hitler of World War II’. Following on from the critique of US military action in Vietnam OSPAAAL also called for greater solidarity between countries around the world following victories against US forces in Vietnam, Cambodia, and Laos.

Beyond solidarity with anti-colonial struggles on a nation-state level, OSPAAAL campaigned for individuals involved in independence and anti-imperialist activities. OSPAAAL on behalf of a member organization, the Puerto Rican Socialist Party, called for support for Puerto Rican independence fighter Humberto Pagán. Following his arrest in Canada, OSPAAAL called for ‘all revolutionary and progressive countries, parties and organisations to declare solidarity with Humberto Pagán militantly in every way possible’. Their aim was to highlight the perceived injustice of the court proceedings and to prevent the extradition of Pagán in fear for his safety were he to return to Puerto Rico. After refusing to grant an extradition order, and upon appeal to the Canadian Supreme Court, Humberto Pagán was cleared of all charges and the extradition request was denied.

== Posters ==
The poster was the response to a fundamental aim: that of supporting the struggle of the freedom movements. And this took place not only in many third-world countries; the horizons were soon extended to bring solidarity even to the United States... overcoming the frontiers represented by the triple ‘A’ in the organization’s name (Asia, Africa, Latin America), or simply reporting episodes of violence, brutality and cruelty by the rulers and military forces which underline their colonial and predatory anxieties in far-off lands such as Vietnam or South Africa.

— Olivio Martínez, OSPAAAL artist

From its foundation until the mid-1980s, OSPAAAL produced brightly coloured propaganda posters promoting their cause. Financial difficulty and ink shortages due to the US embargo against Cuba pushed the artists and printers to find ingenious solutions with unorthodox outcomes, although it ultimately forced the organization to stop producing these posters. However, these posters began to be printed again in 2000.

These posters, as they intended to be internationalist, usually had their message written in Spanish, English, French, and Arabic. As opposed to being put up on walls around Cuba, these posters were instead folded up and stapled into copies of Tricontinental, so that they could be distributed internationally. This allowed OSPAAAL to send its message to its subscribers around the world.

All OSPAAAL-Posters from the beginning until 2003 are documented and indexed in the book The Tricontinental Solidarity Poster. One American, Jane Norling, is among the artists who designed posters for OSPAAAL, and is one of eight women who contributed designs for 22 of the approximately 326 OSPAAAL posters.

== See also ==
- Afro-Asian People's Solidarity Organisation
- Latin American Solidarity Organization
- Soviet Afro-Asian Solidarity Committee
- Tricontinental
