= Peter Coyote =

American actor and director (born 1941)

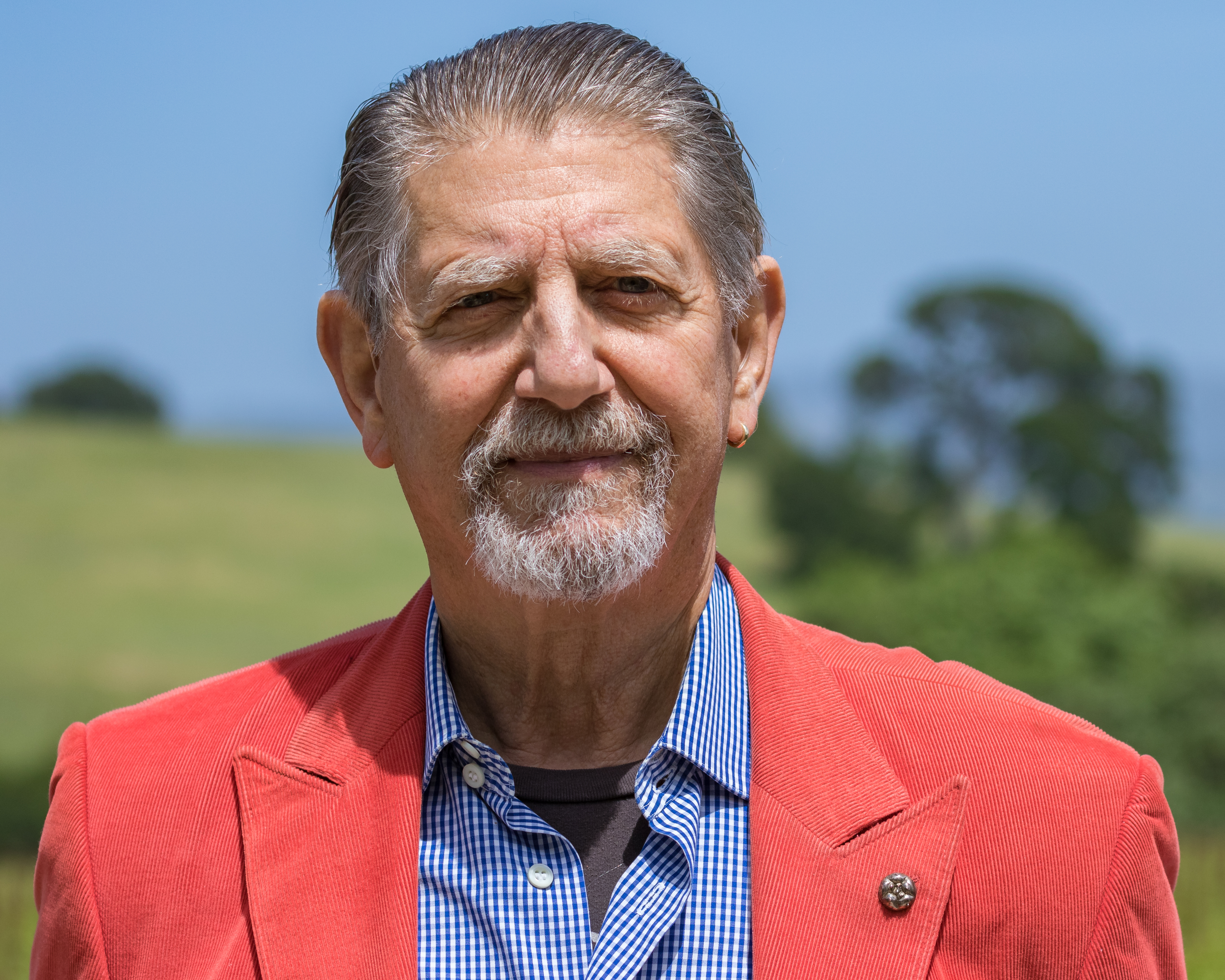
- Coyote in 2019
- Born: Robert Peter Cohon; October 10, 1941 (age 85); New York City, U.S.
- Education: Grinnell College (BA)
- Occupations: Actor; director; screenwriter; author; narrator
- Years active: 1967–present
- Spouses: Marilyn McCann (m. 1975; div. 1998) Stefanie Pleet (m. 1998; div. 2015)
- Children: 2
- Website: petercoyote.com

Peter Coyote (born Robert Peter Cohon; October 10, 1941) is an American actor, director, screenwriter, author, and narrator of films, theater, television, and audiobooks. He is known for his appearances in films such as E.T. the Extra-Terrestrial (1982), Cross Creek (1983), Jagged Edge (1985), Bitter Moon (1992), Kika (1993), Patch Adams (1998), Erin Brockovich (2000), A Walk to Remember (2002), and Femme Fatale (2002).

His voice work includes his narration for the opening ceremony of the 2002 Winter Olympics. He narrated the PBS series The Pacific Century (1992), winning an Emmy. He won a Primetime Emmy Award for Outstanding Narrator in 2015 for his work on Ken Burns's documentary miniseries The Roosevelts: An Intimate History.

Coyote was one of the founders of the Diggers, an anarchist improv group active in Haight-Ashbury during the mid-1960s, including the Summer of Love.

== Early life ==
Coyote was born Robert Peter Cohon on October 10, 1941, in New York City, the son of Ruth (née Fidler) and Morris Cohon, an investment banker. His father was of Sephardic Jewish descent and his mother came from a working-class Ashkenazi Jewish family. Her father, trained as a rabbi in Russia, escaped being drafted into the Imperial Russian Army, and eventually ran a small candy store in the Bronx. Coyote "was raised in a highly intellectual, cultural but unreligious family", involved in left-wing politics. He grew up in Englewood, New Jersey, and graduated from Dwight Morrow High School there in 1959. Coyote later said that he was "half black and half white inside" due to the strong influence of Susie Nelson, his family's African-American housekeeper. Coyote is the maternal uncle of librarian Jessamyn West.

While a student at Grinnell College, Iowa, in 1961, Coyote was one of the organizers of a group of twelve students who traveled to Washington, D.C. during the Cuban Missile Crisis supporting President John F. Kennedy's "peace race". Kennedy invited the group into the White House, the first time protesters had ever been so recognized, and they met for several hours with McGeorge Bundy. The group received wide press coverage. They mimeographed the resulting headlines and sent them to every college in the United States. He was also in a band called the Kittatinny Mountain Boys.

Upon graduation from Grinnell with a Bachelor of Arts in English literature in 1964, he moved to the West Coast, despite having been accepted at the Iowa Writers' Workshop, and commenced working toward a master's degree in creative writing at San Francisco State University.

=== Name change ===
While still at Grinnell, Coyote ingested peyote and had a profound experience with something he recognized as an animal spirit. At the next dawn he came to in a cornfield dotted with paw-prints. A few years later, he came across Coyote's Journal, a poetry magazine, and recognized its logo as the same paw-prints he had seen during his peyote experience. After meeting Rolling Thunder (John Pope), a purported Paiute-Shoshone shaman, who informed him that there were two ways to regard what he had experienced. "You could consider it a hallucination", he said, "and you'll just remain a white man and be ok. Or, you could consider that the Universe opened itself to you, and if you consider it deeply enough, you might become a human being." Peter considered what he had been saying for several months, and then changed his last name to Coyote.

== Countercultural activities ==
After a short apprenticeship at the San Francisco Actor's Workshop, he joined the San Francisco Mime Troupe, a radical political street theater whose members were arrested for performing in parks without permits. Coyote acted, wrote scripts, and directed in the Mime Troupe. Coyote directed the first cross-country tour of The Minstrel Show, Civil Rights in a Cracker Barrel, a controversial play closed by authorities in several cities.

From 1967 to 1975, Coyote was a prominent member of the San Francisco Haight-Ashbury counterculture community and a founding member, along with Emmett Grogan, Peter Berg, Judy Goldhaft, Kent Minault, Nina Blasenheim, David Simpson, Jane Lapiner, and Billy Murcott, of the Diggers, an anarchist group known for operating anonymously and without money. They created provocative "theater" events designed to heighten awareness of problems associated with the notion of private property, consumerism, and identification with one's work. They fed nearly 600 people a day for "free", asking only that people pass through a six-foot by six-foot square known as The Free Frame of Reference. They ran a Free Store, (where not only the goods, but the management roles were free), a Free Medical Clinic, and even a short-lived Free Bank. The Diggers evolved into a group known as the Free Family, which established chains of communes around the Pacific Northwest and Southwest. Coyote was the best known resident of the Black Bear Ranch commune in Siskiyou County, California.

== Discovering Zen ==
Coyote had first discovered Zen in his teens via the works of Jack Kerouac, Gary Snyder, and other Beats. Coyote met Snyder with the Diggers and was impressed with Snyder's "gravitas and elegance, his care and deliberation".

In 1975, Coyote undertook meditation practice and eventually became a dedicated practitioner of American Zen Buddhism, moving into the San Francisco Zen Center. He was later ordained a lay priest in the Sōtō tradition and was ordained as a Zen Priest in 2015.

Coyote performed audiobook recordings of Shunryu Suzuki's Zen Mind, Beginner's Mind and Paul Reps's Zen Flesh, Zen Bones as well as narrating the documentary Inquiry into the Great Matter: A History of Zen Buddhism.

== Transition to a professional career ==
In 1975, Coyote was hired as an artist under the Comprehensive Employment and Training Act, which placed him in community settings. His experiences under CETA led to his becoming part of the San Francisco Arts Commission. In 1976, Governor Jerry Brown appointed him to the California Arts Council, where he served until 1983 (three years as Chair).

== Film and television acting ==
In 1978, Coyote began acting again ("to shake the rust out") appearing in plays at San Francisco's award-winning Magic Theatre. While he was playing the lead in the world premiere of Sam Shepard's True West, a Hollywood agent approached him, and his film career began with Die Laughing (1980). He gave supporting performances in Tell Me a Riddle (1980), Southern Comfort (1981), and as the mysterious scientist "Keys" in E.T. the Extra-Terrestrial (1982). He was seriously considered for the role of Indiana Jones in Raiders of the Lost Ark (1981), and auditioned for the part. Coyote's first starring role was in the science fiction adventure Timerider: The Adventure of Lyle Swann (1982). He also starred in Jagged Edge (1985) and Outrageous Fortune (1987). Since then, he has made more than 120 films for theaters and television and has played starring roles for many directors, including Roman Polanski (Bitter Moon), Pedro Almodóvar (Kika), Martin Ritt (Cross Creek), Jean-Paul Rappeneau (Bon Voyage), Diane Kurys (A Man in Love), and Walter Salles (Exposure). For his 1990 guest appearance on the television series Road to Avonlea, he received his first Primetime Emmy Award nomination.

In addition to his movie work in more recent films such as Sphere, A Walk to Remember, and Erin Brockovich, Coyote has also appeared in many made-for-television movies and miniseries, and he does commercial voice-overs. Coyote was cast in lead roles on several television series: The 4400 in 2004 and The Inside in 2005. After The Inside was canceled, Coyote returned to The 4400 as a special guest star for their two-part season finale, then joined the cast of ABC's series Commander in Chief as the Vice President of the United States, and the next year did a four-episode turn as Sally Field's disreputable boyfriend in Brothers & Sisters.

== Narration ==
In 2005, Coyote served as the narrator for several prominent projects including the documentary film Enron: The Smartest Guys in the Room and the National Geographic-produced PBS documentary based on Jared Diamond's Guns, Germs, and Steel. He also narrated an episode of the series Lost in April 2006. In 2008, he narrated Torturing Democracy, a documentary produced by PBS which details the George W. Bush administration's use of "enhanced interrogation techniques" in the war on terror. He also narrated the 12-hour Ken Burns series on the National Parks, and 15 episodes for the National Geographic Explorer series.

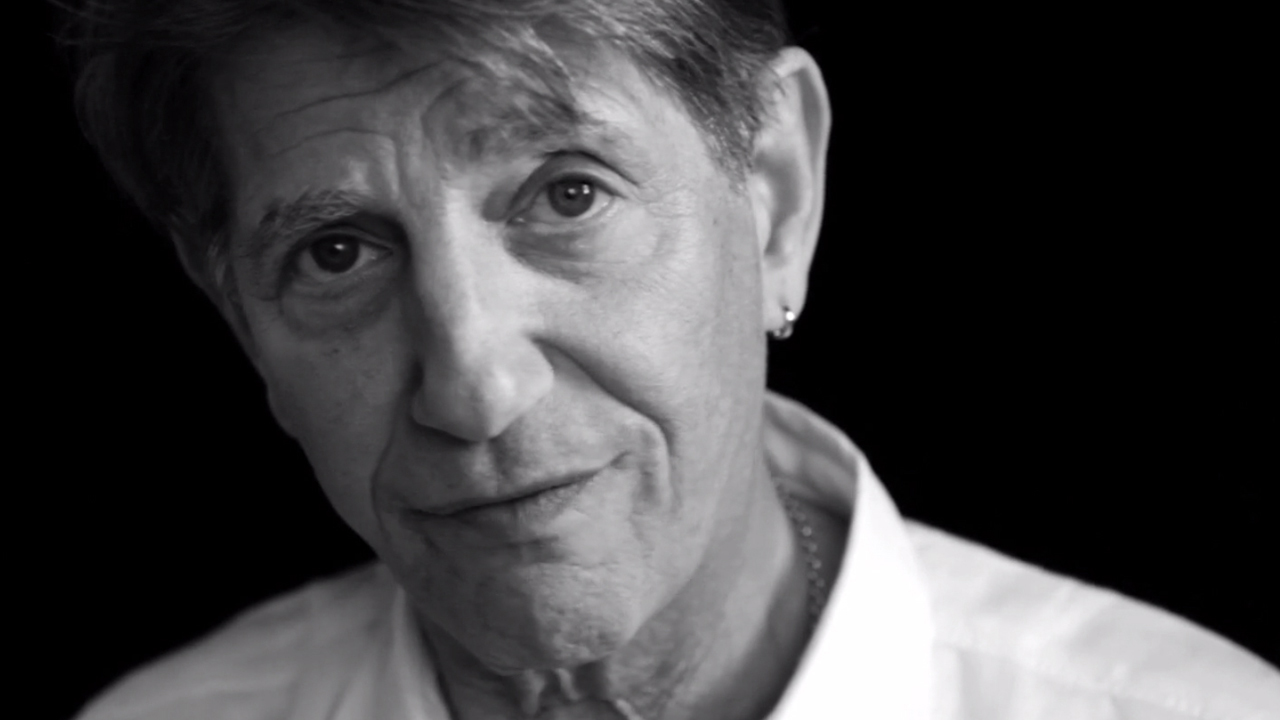
Coyote in 2011

In 2010, he narrated the documentary Solitary Confinement on the effect of long-term isolation, with footage taken from Colorado State Penitentiary where all prisoners are held this way. In 2014, he appeared in the TNT television series Perception, as the father of the main character, Dr. Daniel Pierce, and narrated Burns' The Roosevelts: An Intimate History; the latter saw him win his first Primetime Emmy Award. In 2017, he narrated the 17¼-hour Ken Burns and Lynn Novick PBS documentary series The Vietnam War. In 2019, he narrated Burns' PBS documentary Country Music. Most recently he has provided narration for a number of commercials produced by The Lincoln Project. and narrated the audiobook, Trilogy – Three True Stories of Scoundrels and Schemers by Peggy Adler, which won a gold medal in the 2024 Independent Publisher Book Awards (aka IPPY) Competition [Category #91].

In 2025, Coyote narrated The American Revolution, a PBS documentary series by Ken Burns, Sarah Botstein, and David P. Schmidt.

== Writing ==
Coyote's left-wing politics are evident in his articles for Mother Jones magazine, some of which he wrote as a delegate to the 1996 Democratic National Convention; in his disagreements with David Horowitz; and in his autobiography Sleeping Where I Fall. In 2006, Coyote developed a political television show for Link TV called "The Active Opposition" and in 2007 created Outside the Box with Peter Coyote starting on Link TV's special, Special: The End of Oil – Part 2.

Many of Coyote's stories from the 1967 to 1975 counter-culture period are included in his memoir, Sleeping Where I Fall, published by Counterpoint Press in April 1998. One of the stories incorporated into his book is "Carla's Story," about a 16-year-old mother who lived communally with Coyote, and who, after learning of her husband's murder, became a drug addict, then a prostitute, had her children stolen, and continued to spiral downhill until she turned her life around. This story was published in Zyzzyva, and awarded the 1993–1994 Pushcart Prize. He also states he was a close friend of singer Janis Joplin. Coyote has a website, which features the titles of all his movies and extended samples of much of his writing. He is a member at RedRoom.com, a website for authors.

In April 2015, his memoir The Rainman's Third Cure: An Irregular Education was released, where he "provides portraits of mentors that shaped him—including his violent, intimidating father, a bass player, a Mafia Consiglieri, and beat poet Gary Snyder, who introduced him to the practice of Zen."

In September 2021, Four Way Books released a collection of Coyote's poetry entitled Tongue of a Crow. The poems span five decades and cover his life as "an activist, actor and Zen Buddhist priest."

In March 2024, Inner Traditions published Zen in the Vernacular: Things As It Is. The book is based on lectures Coyote gave on Facebook during the COVID 19 pandemic. Kirkus Reviews states that he writes "very directly about human iniquities ranging from the Holocaust to the systemic racism of modern-day American law enforcement. The calm, inexorably sensible way Coyote links the deeper principles of Buddhism to secular social awareness is cumulatively convincing. He never browbeats, and he never allows even his non-Buddhist readers any easy excuses." They conclude that Coyote's book presents "a quietly uplifting, practical view of Buddhism."

== Filmography ==
=== Actor ===
- Alcatraz: The Whole Shocking Story (1980) as Lt. Micklin
- Die Laughing (1980) as Davis
- Southern Comfort (1981) as Sergeant Poole
- Isabel's Choice (1981 TV film) as Wynn Thomas
- Timerider: The Adventure of Lyle Swann (1982) as Porter Reese
- E.T. the Extra-Terrestrial (1982) as Keys
- Endangered Species (1982) as Steele
- Out (1982) as Rex
- Strangers' Kiss (1983) Stanley, the Director
- Cross Creek (1983) as Norton Baskin
- Slayground (1983) as Stone
- Heartbreakers (1984) as Arthur Blue
- The Legend of Billie Jean (1985) as Det. Larry Ringwald
- Jagged Edge (1985) as Thomas Krasny
- The Blue Yonder (1985) as Max Knickerbocker
- Outrageous Fortune (1987) as Michael Sanders
- Un homme amoureux (1987) as Steve Elliott
- Echoes in the Darkness (1987 TV mini-series) as William Bradfield Jr.
- Heart of Midnight (1988) as Sharpe/Larry
- The Man Inside (1990) as Henry Tobel
- A Grande Arte - American title is Exposure (1991) as Mr. Peter Mandrake
- Keeper of the City (1991) as Frank Nordhall
- Road to Avonlea (1991) as Romney Penhallow
- Bitter Moon (1992) as Oscar
- Kika (1993) as Nicholas
- That Eye, the Sky (1994) as Henry Warburton
- Breach of Conduct (1994) as Col. Andrew Case
- Moonlight and Valentino (1995) as Paul
- Buffalo Girls (1995) as Buffalo Bill Cody
- Unforgettable (1996) as Don Bresler
- Murder in My Mind (1997) as Arthur Lefcourt
- Road Ends (1997) as Gene Gere
- Sphere (1998) as Captain Harold C. Barnes
- Two for Texas (1998 TNT movie for TV) as Jim Bowie
- Patch Adams (1998) as Bill Davis
- Route 9 (1998) as Sheriff Dwayne Hogan
- Random Hearts (1999) as Cullen Chandler
- Execution of Justice (1999) as Harvey Milk
- The Basket (1999) as Martin Conlon
- More Dogs Than Bones (2000) as Det. Darren Cody
- Erin Brockovich (2000) as Kurt Potter
- Jack the Dog (2001) as Alfred Stieglitz
- Midwives (2001) as Stephen Hastings
- Femme Fatale (2002) as Watts
- A Walk to Remember (2002) as Rev. Sullivan
- Founding Brothers (2002) as Thomas Jefferson (voice)
- Bon Voyage (2003) as Alex Winckler
- Northfork (2003) as Eddie
- The Hebrew Hammer (2003) as JJL Chief Bloomenbergensteinenthal
- Deadwood (2004) as General Crook
- Law & Order: Trial by Jury (2005) as Mike LaSalle
- Independent Lens (2005–2009) as Narrator
- The Inside (2005) as Special Agent Webster
- Deepwater (2005) as Herman Finch
- A Little Trip to Heaven (2005) as Frank
- Return of the Living Dead: Necropolis (2005) as Uncle Charles
- Return of the Living Dead: Rave to the Grave (2005) as Uncle Charles
- Commander in Chief (2005–2006) as Warren Keaton
- The 4400 (2004–2006) as Dennis Ryland
- Behind Enemy Lines II: Axis of Evil (2006) as President Manning
- Law & Order: Criminal Intent (2001–2011). Episode aired 15 November 2007, Season 07, Episode 07 as Lionel Shill
- Brothers & Sisters (2007) as Mark August
- Five Dollars a Day (2008) as Bert Kruger
- Dr. Dolittle: Tail to the Chief as President Sterling
- All Roads Lead Home (2008) as Hock
- NCIS (2008) as Ned Quinn
- The Lena Baker Story (2008) as Elliot Arthur
- FlashForward (2009) as President Dave Segovia
- This Is Not a Movie (2010) as CEO of Propaganda / screenwriter
- Law & Order: Los Angeles (2010-2011) as District Attorney Jerry Hardin
- Last Will (2011) as Judge Garner
- The Gundown (2011) as Tom Morgan
- Stage Left: A Story of Theater in the Bay Area (2011) as Himself
- La Rançon de la gloire (2014) as John Crooker
- Good Kill (2014) as Langley (voice)
- Blue Bloods (2015) as Senator McCreary
- Eva & Leon (2015) as Le père d'Eva
- No Deposit (2015) as Police Chief Williams
- The Disappearance (2017) as Henry Sullivan
- 1 Mile to You (2017) as Prin. Umber
- The Etruscan Smile (2018) as Professor
- The Comey Rule (2020) as Robert Mueller
- The Real Activist (2020) as Himself
- The Girl Who Believes in Miracles (2021) as Sam Donovan

=== Narrator ===
List of Peter Coyote documentaries

- The UFO Experience, a television documentary directed by Ronald K. Lakis in which Coyote appeared and also narrated (1982)
- Contrary Warriors (1986)
- Zen Mind, Beginner's Mind (1988)
- Waldo Salt: A Screenwriter's Journey (1990)
- Hatchet by Gary Paulsen
- The Education of Little Tree by Forrest Carter
- The Breathtaker by Alice Blanchard
- The Teachings of Don Juan: A Yaqui Way of Knowledge by Carlos Castaneda
- The Studio System, American Cinema, New York Center for Visual History (1994)
- National Geographic: Cyclone! (1995)
- The West Produced by Ken Burns and directed by Stephen Ives (1996)
- 21st Century Jet: The Building of the Boeing 777 (1996)
- Survivors of the Skeleton Coast (1997)
- When Disasters Strike II (1997)
- Video Justice: Crime Caught on Tape (1997)
- World's Scariest Police Chases Pilot episode (1997)
- TITANIC: Breaking New Ground (1998)
- The History of Sex (1999)
- Rome: Power & Glory (1999)
- National Geographic: The Battle For Midway produced by Michael Rosenfeld (1999)
- In the Light of Reverence (2001)
- The Color of War (2001)
- Out of the Blue (2002)
- The Shapes of Life: Origins (2002)
- Seth Eastman: Painting the Dakota (2002)
- The Four Agreements: A Practical Guide to Personal Freedom by Don Miguel Ruiz
- The Fifth Agreement: A Practical Guide to Self-Mastery by Don Miguel Ruiz
- Oil on Ice (2004)
- The Voice of Knowledge : A Practical Guide to Inner Peace (Toltec Wisdom) by Don Miguel Ruiz (2004)
- Kursk: A Submarine In Troubled Waters by Jean-Michel Carré (2004)
- National Geographic: Surviving Everest (Peter Coyote, Liesl Clark, 2004)
- National Geographic: Guns, Germs, and Steel (Jared Diamond, 2005)
- Enron: The Smartest Guys in the Room (2005)
- Understanding: Extraterrestrials
- The Tribe (2005)
- National Geographic Explorer – Journey to an Alien Moon produced by Mark Mannucci
- National Geographic: Lost Treasures of Afghanistan produced by James Barrat (2006)
- National Geographic: The Gospel of Judas produced by James Barrat (2006)
- The War Prayer (2006)
- Fog City Mavericks (2007)
- Hippies (2007)
- Stealing America: Vote by Vote (2008)
- Torturing Democracy (2008)
- What If Cannabis Cured Cancer
- Illicit: The Dark Trade (2008)
- National Geographic Explorer: Congo Bush Pilots producer/director/writer by Tony Gerber (2008)
- Gray Eagles (2009)
- National Geographic Explorer: "Easter Island Underworld". (2009)
- National Geographic Explorer : The Virus Hunters (2009)
- National Geographic Explorer : Inside Guantanamo Bay (2009)
- The National Parks: America's Best Idea directed by Ken Burns (2009)
- Full Color Football: The History of the American Football League (2009)
- Reclaiming Their Voice: The Native American Vote in New Mexico & Beyond (2009)
- For the Rights of All: Ending Jim Crow in Alaska
- The Top 100: NFL's Greatest Players (2010)
- Connected: An Autoblogography About Love, Death, & Technology (2011)
- I Am Fishead: Are Corporate Leaders Psychopaths?
- NHL 36: Patrick Kane (2011)
- NHL 36: Patrice Bergeron (2011)
- Prohibition by Ken Burns (2011)
- White Water, Black Gold (2011)
- NHL 36: Niklas Lidstrom (2012)
- NHL 36: Mike Richards (2012)
- NHL 36: James Neal (2012)
- The Dust Bowl (2012) Host and narrator of PBS miniseries directed by Ken Burns
- PBS: The Ghost Army (2013)
- Oregon Experience: Hanford Oregon Public Broadcasting (2013)
- Big Bend: Life on the Edge (2013)
- PBS: The Roosevelts: An Intimate History by Ken Burns (2014)
- Pretty Slick by James Fox (2014)
- Sands of War (2015)
- The Illusionists by Elena Rossini (2015)
- PBS (KUED): Unspoken: America's Native American Boarding Schools (2016)
- Managing Risk in a Changing Climate (2017)
- Paying the Price for Peace: The Story of S. Brian Willson (2018)
- The Vietnam War by Ken Burns and Lynn Novick (2017)
- PBS: Moscone: A Legacy of Change (2018)
- The Etruscan Smile (2018)
- 25 Steps (2018)
- PBS: Country Music by Ken Burns (2019)
- The Phenomenon by James Fox (2020)
- PBS: Hemingway by Ken Burns (2021)
- Geospatial Revolution: Mapping the Pandemic, Penn State Public Broadcasting (2022)
- PBS: Benjamin Franklin by Ken Burns (2022)
- PBS: The U.S. and the Holocaust by Ken Burns (2022)
- Moment of Contact by James Fox (2022)
- PBS: The American Buffalo by Ken Burns (2023)
- Bad Faith (2024)
- PBS: The American Revolution (TV series) by Ken Burns (2025)
- The Climate Restorers (2025)

== Bibliography ==
- Coyote, Peter (1999), Sleeping Where I Fall: A Chronicle, Counterpoint Press, ISBN 978-1582430119
- Corrigan, Michael (2008). A Year and a Day: A Grief Journal. Idaho State University. ISBN 9780937834763. Includes Peter Coyote's emails to Michael Corrigan after Corrigan lost his wife.
- Coyote, Peter (2015), The Rainman's Third Cure: An Irregular Education, Counterpoint Press, ISBN 978-1619024960
- Coyote, Peter (2021), Tongue of a Crow, Four Way Books, ISBN 9781945588952
- Coyote, Peter (2021), The Lone Ranger and Tonto Meet the Buddha: Masks, Meditation, and Improvised Play to Induce Liberated States, Inner Traditions – Bear & Company, ISBN 978-1644113561
- Coyote, Peter (2024), Zen in the Vernacular: Things As It Is, Inner Traditions, ISBN 978-1-64411-975-4

=== Illustrator ===
- Emmett Grogan (1990) Ringolevio: A Life Played for Keeps, autobiography
