= Jim Dodge =

American novelist and poet

- Born: 1945 (age 80–81); Santa Rosa, California, United States
- Occupations: Novelist, poet
- Writing career
- Period: 1983–present
- Genre: American literature

Jim Dodge (born 1945) is an American novelist and poet whose works combine themes of folklore and fantasy, set in a timeless present. He has published three novels—Fup, Not Fade Away, and Stone Junction—and a collection of poetry and prose, Rain on the River.

== Biography ==
Dodge was born in 1945 and grew up as an Air Force brat. As an adult he spent many years living on an almost self-sufficient commune in West Sonoma County, California. He has had many jobs, including apple picker, carpet layer, teacher, professional gambler, shepherd, woodcutter, and environmental restorer. He received his Master of Fine Arts in Creative Writing/Poetry from the University of Iowa Writers Workshop in 1969. He has been the director of the Creative Writing program in the English Department at Humboldt State University in Arcata, California since 1995. He lives in Manila, California, with his wife and son.

Some of Dodge's nonfiction essays focus on bioregionalism.

== Books ==
- Fup (1983), City Miner Books ISBN 0-933944-04-7. A duck, named Fup, lives on a farm with an old man who believes he is immortal due to the homemade whiskey he drinks. The recipe for the whiskey, also known as "Ol' Death Whisper", was bestowed upon him by a dying Indian.
- Not Fade Away (1987). "Floorboard" George Gastin is part of an insurance scam to wreck a pure white, mint condition '59 Cadillac originally intended as a gift for The Big Bopper as a token of an admirer's love. Floorboard George has other ideas and when he disappears with the car, gangsters and cops are soon in hot pursuit. On the road he meets crazy characters, hitch-hikers and demented preachers as he covers many miles—and states of mind—in his quest to find the true spirit of rock 'n' roll.
- Stone Junction (1990). Daniel Pearse's journey from childhood to adulthood amid magic, mayhem and mysticism all guided by a mysterious organization named AMO, the Alliance of Magicians and Outlaws. A series of apprenticeships teaches Daniel meditation, safecracking, poker, and the art of becoming invisible. The first edition has a blurb by Thomas Pynchon on the dust jacket. The 1998 edition includes a more lengthy Pynchon introduction.
- Rain on the River (2002), Grove Press. Selected poems and prose from 1970 to 2001.

== Essays ==
- "Living By Life: Some Bioregional Theory and Practice". CoEvolution Quarterly, Winter 1981, pp. 6–12. (pdf version)
- "Routes" in Peter Berg, ed. Reinhabiting a Separate Country: A Bioregional Anthology of Northern California. 1978. Planet Drum Foundation, San Francisco.
