= Diggers (theater) =

Community anarchist group in San Francisco, California, US

The Diggers
- Formation: 1966; 60 years ago
- Founders: Emmett Grogan; Peter Coyote; Peter Berg; Billy Landout
- Dissolved: 1968
- Type: Community-action group
- Purpose: To create a mini-society free of money and capitalism
- Headquarters: Haight-Ashbury, San Francisco, California, U.S.
- Services: Free music concerts; Works of political art; Free food; Medical care; Transport; Temporary housing; Free Stores; Happenings: Death of Money Parade, Intersection Game, Invisible Circus, Death of Hippie/Birth of Free
- Publication: The Digger Papers
- Website: www.diggers.org

The Diggers were a radical community-action group of activists and street theatre actors operating from 1966 to 1968, based in the Haight-Ashbury neighborhood of San Francisco. Their politics have been categorized as "left-wing;" more accurately, they were "community anarchists" who blended a desire for freedom with a consciousness of the community in which they lived. The Diggers' central tenet was to be "authentic," seeking to create a society free from the dictates of money and capitalism.

The Diggers were closely associated and shared a number of members with the guerrilla theater group San Francisco Mime Troupe. They were formed out of after-hours Mime Troupe discussions between Emmett Grogan, Peter Coyote, Peter Berg, and Billy Landout.

The Diggers fostered and inspired later groups like the Yippies.

== Origins ==
The Diggers took their name from the original English Diggers (1649–1650) who had promulgated a vision of society free from buying, selling, and private property. During the mid- and late 1960s, the San Francisco Diggers organized free music concerts and works of political art, provided free food, medical care, transport, and temporary housing and opened stores that gave away stock. Some of their events included the Death of Money Parade, Intersection Game, Invisible Circus, and Death of Hippie/Birth of Free.

== Publishing ==
One of the first Digger activities was the publishing of various broadsides, which were printed by sneaking into the local Students for a Democratic Society office and using their Gestetner printer. The leaflets were eventually called The Digger Papers, and soon morphed into small pamphlets with poetry, psychedelic art, and essays. The first issue of The Digger Papers was published in Fall 1965. Peter Berg was one of the regular contributors to the publication.

The Digger Papers originated such phrases as "Do your own thing" and "Today is the first day of the rest of your life."

They often included statements that mocked the prevailing attitude of the counterculture promoted by less-radical figures like the Haight-Independent Proprietors (HIP), Timothy Leary, and Richard Alpert. The first paper mocked the acid community, saying "Time to forget because flowers are beautiful and the sun's not yellow, it's chicken!" They rarely included authors' names, though some had pseudonyms like "George Metevsky," a reference to the "Mad Bomber" George Metesky. (After some HIP members tried to find out who the Diggers were, Grogan and Landout responded with a telegram: "REGARDING INQUIRIES CONCERNED WITH THE IDENTITY AND WHEREABOUTS OF THE DIGGERS; HAPPY TO REPORT THE DIGGERS ARE NOT THAT.")

The 1% Free poster, showing two Chinese Tong assassins under the Chinese character for "revolution," was thought to be demanding a 1% tithe from merchants, but that was not the case. The poster was a challenge, implicitly suggesting that "free" people were the minority, and inciting others to step up.

=== The Communications Company (ComCo) ===
Pretty little 16-year-old middle-class chick comes to the Haight to see what it’s all about and gets picked up by a 17-year-old street dealer who spends all day shooting her full of speed again and again, then feeds her 3,000 mikes & raffles off her temporarily unemployed body for the biggest Haight Street gang bang since the night before last. The politics and ethics of ecstasy. Rape is as common as bullshit on Haight Street. Kids are starving on the Street. Minds and bodies are being maimed as we watch, a scale model of Vietnam. (Note: This text is excerpted from a communique titled "Uncle Tim'$ [sic] Children", dated April 16, 1967. "Uncle Tim" is a reference to Timothy Leary. See image here and transcription here.)

— Chester Anderson, from a ComCo communique as qtd. by Joan Didion

Writers Chester Anderson and Claude and Helene Hayward helped found the publishing arm of the Diggers, known as the Communications Company (ComCo). Using "two 'beautiful' Gestetner mimeograph machines that had been nefariously obtained through the offices of Ramparts magazine," the Communications Company distributed daily (and sometimes hourly) broadsides on the streets of the Haight-Ashbury district during the early part of 1967 and the Summer of Love. ComCo was a member of the Underground Press Syndicate, a network of countercultural newspapers and magazines.

Through the Communications Company, Anderson circulated a number of his own bitter broadside polemics in the Haight, including, in April 1967, "Uncle Tim'$ Children," with its infamous, often-quoted line, "Rape is as common as bullshit on Haight Street."

Richard Brautigan's poem "All Watched Over by Machines of Loving Grace" was first published, in March 1967, by the Communication Company on an 8.5-by-11-inch (216 by 279 mm) mimeographed broadside with both the title and imprint handwritten. The first run included a picture of a megaphone, and a second printing had an image of people working on a large computer, rotated to run vertically beside the poem, with simple line drawings of animals all over the page. In April of the same year, the Communication Company published it again as the title poem in the collection by the same name. It included 36 typewritten yellow pages measuring 8.75-by-7-inch (222 by 178 mm), in a print run of 1,500, all of which were given away for free. Brautigan then gave permission to The Diggers to include the poem in the final edition of The Digger Papers, published in August 1968.

Also in March 1967, ComCo distributed Willard S. Bain's Informed Sources: Day East Received, a satirical allegory of the assassination of John F. Kennedy in the form of fictional news wire bulletins, in an edition of about 500 mimeographed copies.

The Communications Company also published Harry Driggs' pioneering underground comic The Life and Loves of Cleopatra (June 1967), an obscene 28-page narrative inspired by the Elizabeth Taylor film Cleopatra, and which featured artwork that today would be seen as child pornography. The Diggers gave away the comic in their free store at the corner of Cole and Carl in Haight-Ashbury.

Joan Didion described the role Chester Anderson and ComCo played in Haight-Ashbury in her 1967 essay for The Saturday Evening Post, "Slouching Towards Bethlehem", which was later included in the book of the same name.

== Parties, theater events, and happenings ==
The Diggers threw free parties with music provided by the Grateful Dead, Janis Joplin, Jefferson Airplane and other bands. They also staged street theater events, such as driving a truck of semi-naked belly dancers through the Financial District, inviting brokers to climb on board and forget their work.

On December 17, 1966, the Diggers held a happening called "The Death of Money" in which they dressed in animal masks and carried a large coffin full of fake money down Haight Street, singing "Get out my life, why don’t you babe?" to the tune of Chopin's "Funeral March" (or "Death March").

This was a precursor to the happening "The Death of Hippie," staged in October 1967, in the Haight-Ashbury neighborhood. Masked participants carried a coffin with the words "Hippie—Son of Media" on the side. This event was meant to mark the end of the hippie era of Haight-Ashbury. The event was staged so as to make any media outlet that simply described the happening to unintentionally transmit the Diggers' message that Hippies were a media invention. This was called "creating the condition you describe". The Diggers skillfully used this technique for media relations.

== Free stores, food, medical care ==
The Diggers opened numerous free stores in Haight-Ashbury which offered discarded but usable items, free for the taking or giving. The first free store was in a six-car garage on Page Street that they found filled with empty picture frames; they tacked these up outside the building and called it the Free Frame of Reference.

The Diggers provided free food service in the Panhandle of Golden Gate Park every day at four o'clock, feeding about 100 people with a stew from donated meat and vegetables that was served from behind a giant yellow picture frame, also called the Free Frame of Reference, which people were required to step through before being served.

This was superseded by the Trip Without a Ticket on Frederick Street. It was unclear how the stores were funded.

The Diggers also opened a free medical clinic, initially by inviting volunteers from the University of California, San Francisco medical school up the hill from the neighborhood.

The free food and medical clinics were immediate responses to conditions caused by the enormous influx of young people during the heyday of the hippie scene, conditions that the San Francisco government was ignoring.

=== Digger Bread ===
The Diggers also popularized whole wheat bread: their Digger Bread was baked in coffee cans at the Free Bakery in the basement of Episcopal All Saints Church on 1350 Waller Street. In cooperation with All Saints Church and later via the Haight Ashbury Switchboard at 1830 Fell Street, they arranged free "crashpad" housing for homeless youth drawn to the Haight-Ashbury area.

== Division of labor ==
The Diggers' division of labor between men and women has been criticized as sexist, with male members primarily forming ideas while female members were tasked with most of the practical work to realize these ideas. For instance, in providing free food, the men socialized and promoted the events, while the women did most of the collecting, cooking and serving. Decision-making in the organization was controlled by male Diggers, who either came up with or took credit for new ideas, while female Diggers, who provided much of the organization's income via welfare checks and social assistance, were sidelined. This stratification "typifies prefeminist-era radicalism in the sixties."

== Leaving San Francisco ==
Running soup kitchens and medical clinics, however, was not the authentic, long-term concern of the Diggers' founders. After passing those institutions on to a local church and David E. Smith to continue, the Diggers moved out of the city, creating various land bases in California, including Forest Knolls, Olema, Covelo, Salmon River, Trinidad, and Black Bear Ranch. There they integrated with other groups — The Free Bakery, the Up Against the Wall Motherfuckers, and the Gypsy Truckers — creating The Free Family.

That larger group still exists informally, and many of the Diggers' children and grandchildren remain in contact with one another, and many are still involved with progressive causes.

== In media ==
Joan Didion chronicled her encounters with various Diggers in 1967 in the title essay of her 1968 book, Slouching Towards Bethlehem.

David Talbot prominently features the Diggers and their influence on the city’s 1960s counterculture in Season of the Witch: Enchantment, Terror, and Deliverance in the City of Love, his historical account of San Francisco’s cultural and political transformation over the years.

Various alternative communities like those of the Diggers were covered in a feature-length documentary film by Will Vinton, later known for his ClayMation studio in Portland, Oregon. This early-1970s documentary (1974 according to one source) was titled Gone for a Better Deal, but it has never been released in any video format.

Haight-Ashbury Golden-Gate park poet Ashleigh Brilliant, later known for his pot-Shots epigrams, released a CD of his songs and parodies about "life in the Haight," including two songs about the Diggers.

A fictionalized version of the Diggers was featured in Haleh Roshan's play Free Free Free Free.

Jennifer Egan's novel The Invisible Circus involves the Diggers.

== See also ==
- Counterculture
- Gift economy
- Zippies
