= Joan Mankin =

American actress & clown (1948–2015)

- Mankin in 2013
- Born: May 16, 1948; Minneapolis, Minnesota, U.S.
- Died: September 26, 2015 (aged 67); Little Hollywood, San Francisco, California, U.S.
- Occupations: Actor, clown
- Years active: 1970 - 2014

Joan Mankin (May 16, 1948 – September 26, 2015) was an actor and clown prominent in the San Francisco Bay Area, from the early 1970s through 2014. Mankin started her professional career in San Francisco in 1970 with a production of the San Francisco Mime Troupe's An Independent Female. Thereafter, she appeared in major roles in many Bay Area theater companies including the American Conservatory Theater, Aurora Theatre Company, Berkeley Rep, San Francisco Playhouse and California Shakespeare Theatre as well as the feminist Lilith Theater in the late 1970s early 1980s, of which she was Artistic Director for two years. In 2006 she had a major singing role in the Los Angeles Ahmanson Theatre's production of The Black Rider: The Casting of Magic Bullets.

One of her most notable personas was as 'Queenie Moon' a lead clown and juggler for Pickle Family Circus and Make-A-Circus. Besides performing she also taught theater arts and clowning in San Francisco at Clown Conservatory and in Northern California at Dell'Arte International School of Physical Theatre. She also played a prominent role in the 1998 celebration of the 150th anniversary of the Seneca Falls 1848 Women's Rights convention, and her participation with a group of young women - with whom she staged an original play - became the subject of a film by Louise Vance. She also had a number of supporting television and movies roles.

Her last role was as the Narrator in the West Coast premiere of Di Megileh of Itzik Manger with the New Yiddish Theatre.

== Personal life ==
Mankin was born in Minneapolis, Minnesota, the daughter of Shirley (née Labovich) Mankin, a social worker, and Arthur H. Mankin, an electrical engineer and entrepreneur. She received an A.B. degree from the University of Chicago in 1969. She subsequently received an MA degree in theater arts from San Francisco State University. After leaving the San Francisco Mime Troupe she worked in the San Francisco shipyards, where she met Daniel Macchiarini, a North Beach, San Francisco sculptor and jeweler whom she subsequently married. They had a daughter, Emma Mankin-Morris, who was born in 1980. In June 2014, she was diagnosed with motor neuron disease, which manifested itself both as frontotemporal dementia (FTD) in her brain and as amyotrophic lateral sclerosis (ALS) in her body. When word of her illness spread through the San Francisco performance community, numerous colleagues came together to organize tributes and fundraisers, both to support her medical care and to fund research on the diseases that afflicted her. These events continued both before and after her death September 26, 2015, in her home in the Little Hollywood neighborhood of San Francisco.
