= San Francisco Mime Troupe =

Political satire theater group

- Formation: 1959
- Type: Theatre group
- Purpose: Comedy; Political satire; Melodrama
- Location: San Francisco, California, United States
- Notable members: Peter Coyote; Saul Landau; Bill Graham
- Website: www.sfmt.org

The San Francisco Mime Troupe is a theatre of political satire which performs free shows in various parks in the San Francisco Bay Area and around California, founded in 1959. Despite its name, the group does not perform silent mime, but each year creates an original musical comedy that combines aspects of commedia dell'arte, melodrama, and broad farce with topical political themes. In 1987, the group was awarded the Regional Theatre Award at the 41st Tony Awards.

== Origins ==
The group was founded in 1959 by Ronald G. Davis as a medium of expression of his divergent theatrical concepts. The group debuted on October 29, 1959, with Games—3 Sets, and two other plays. By 1961, the group transitioned to the commedia dell'arte format to more thoroughly comment on perceived political repression in the United States, the growing civil rights movement and military and covert intervention abroad.

In the mid-1960s the group started to rely less on the direct commedia dell'arte format and transitioned into having an objective of "teaching, directing towards change and to be an example of change". It also began integrating elements of jazz into its musical composition, eventually leading to the inclusion of a jazz band within the troupe. Their first outdoor performance was in May 1962 at Golden Gate Park. The group also gained notoriety for its numerous altercations with law enforcement, which resulted in performing at benefits to raise money for legal fees. The group was also associated and shared members with the Diggers. In 1967, a benefit called "Appeal IV" featured the bands the Grateful Dead, Jefferson Airplane, Quicksilver Messenger Service and Moby Grape.

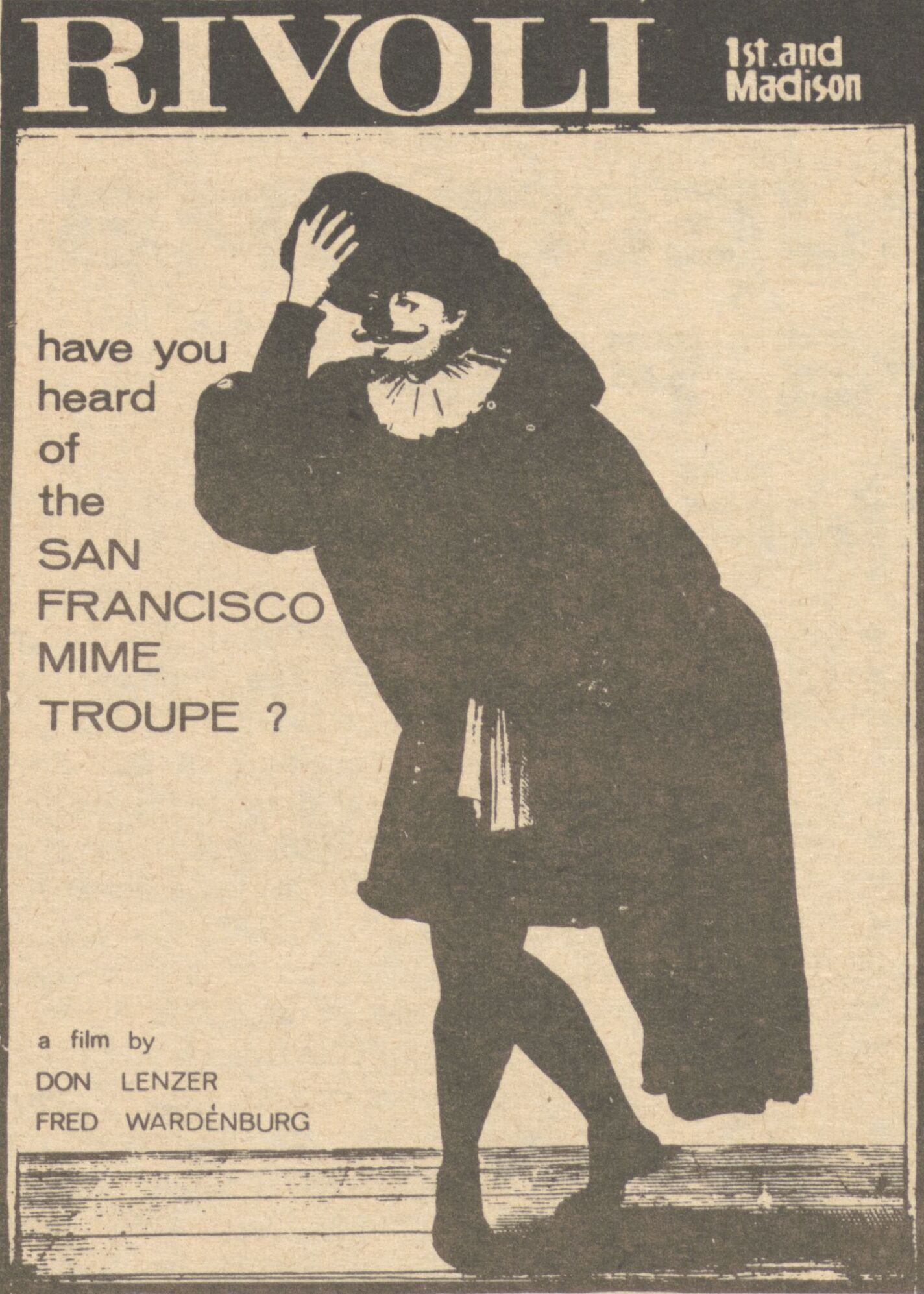
Advertisement for a documentary film about the San Francisco Mime Troupe, Seattle, 1968

They also traveled to Canada and played at Simon Fraser University in 1966 with A Minstrel Show or Civil Rights in a Cracker Barrel by Gary Davis and Saul Landau.

The music for Minstrel Show was composed and performed by Steve Reich, who worked with the troupe for at least two seasons. The troupe has always been known to employ the best composers and musicians in the area, who work intimately with the actors, writers, and whole theatrical operation. By the early 1970s, the troupe had earned a reputation for opposing capitalism, sexism, and war.

== Post-Davis history ==
In the early 1970s Davis left the troupe when it re-formed as a collective, the members of which operate as the artistic director, at which time the troupe produced one of its most successful shows, The Independent Female (1970). In the 1980s, the group's productions retaliated against the Reagan administration.

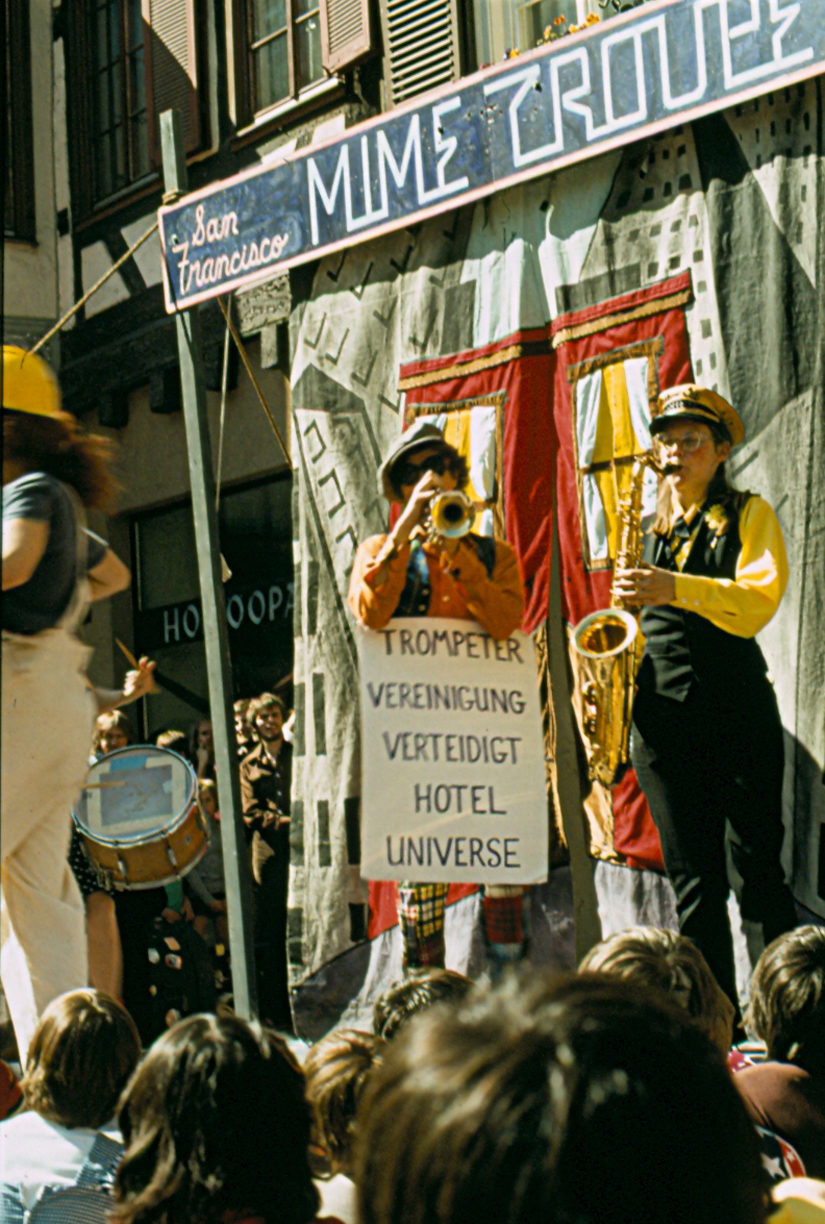
Performing at the Club-Voltaire-Festival in Tübingen, Germany, circa 1980s

As well as the park-based shows, the Mime Troupe also tours nationally and internationally, having performed throughout Europe, Asia, South and Central America. The group also facilitates community workshops. They are a nonprofit organization. The season traditionally starts on Fourth of July weekend and ends on Labor Day weekend.

Notable members include: Saul Landau, Nina Serrano, Steve Reich, John Connell, William T. Wiley, Wally Hedrick, Victoria Hochberg, John Broderick, Peter Coyote, Luis Valdez, Barry Shabaka Henley, Bruce Barthol, Joan Mankin, Emmett Grogan, Bill Graham, and Ed Holmes.

Posters for several of the 1970s productions were designed by Jane Norling, and are accessible online.

== Awards ==
The Troupe has won three OBIEs, and in 1987, the troupe's Brechtian style of guerrilla theatre earned them a special Tony Award for Excellence in Regional Theater. Red State, the troupe's 2008 fable about a small Midwest town that, after years of being ignored, demands accountability for their tax dollars, was nominated for a San Francisco Bay Area Theatre Critics Circle Award for Best New Script, as was their 2009 production, Too Big to Fail, which detailed how credit and the philosophy of profit at all costs trap mesmerized citizens in a cycle of debt, while endlessly enriching the capitalists who cast the spell.

== Productions ==
=== 1950s & 1960s ===
- 1959: Games—3 Sets
- 1959: Mime And Word
- 1960: 11th Hour Mime Show
- 1961: Act without Words
- 1961: Event I
- 1961: Purgatory and Krapp's Last Tape
- 1962: The Dowry
- 1963: Ubu King
- 1963: Event II
- 1963: Film: Plastic Haircut
- 1963: Ruzante's Maneuvers
- 1963: The Root
- 1964: Chorizos
- 1964: Event III
- 1964: Mimes and Movie
- 1964: Tartuffe
- 1965: The Exception and the Rule
- 1965: Candelaio
- 1965: Chronicles of Hell
- * 1965: The Minstrel Show or Civil Rights in a Cracker Barrel
- 1965: Jim Crow in a Cracker Barrel
- 1966: The Miser
- 1966: Film: Mirage And Centerman
- 1966: Jack Off!
- 1966: Olive Pits
- 1966: Search & Seizure
- 1966: What's That Ahead?
- 1967: L'Amant Militaire
- 1967: The Condemned
- 1967: The Vaudeville Show
- 1968: Gutter Puppets (Meter Maid)
- 1968: Little Black Panther
- 1968: Ruzzante or the Veteran Gorilla Marching Band is Formed
- 1969: The Congress of Whitewashers or Turandot
- 1969: The Third Estate

=== 1970s ===
- 1970: Ecoman
- 1970: Los Siete
- 1970: Seize the Time
- 1970: Telephone Man or Ripping off Ma Bell
- 1970: The Independent Female
- 1971: Clown Show
- 1971: The Dragon Lady's Revenge
- 1972: American Dreamer
- 1972: Frozen Wages
- 1972: High Rises
- 1973: The Mother
- 1973: San Francisco Scandals of 1973
- 1974: The Great Air Robbery
- 1975: Frijoles or Beans To You
- 1975: Power Play
- 1976: False Promises/Nos Engañaron
- 1977: Hotel Universe
- 1978: Elektrobucks
- 1979: We Can't Pay, We Won't Pay
- 1979: Squash
- 1979: T.V. Dinner

=== 1980s ===
- 1980: Fact Person
- 1981: Americans or Last Tango in Huahuatenango
- 1981: Factwino Meets the Moral Majority
- 1981: Ghosts
- 1982: Factwino vs. Armagoddonman
- 1982: Hotel Universe
- 1983: Secrets in the Sand
- 1983: The Uprising At Fuente Ovejuna
- 1984: Steeltown
- 1985: Crossing Borders
- 1985: Factwino: The Opera
- 1986: Spain/36
- 1986: The Mozamgola Caper
- 1987: The Dragon Lady's Revenge
- 1988: Ripped Van Winkle
- 1989: Seeing Double

=== 1990s ===
- 1990: Rats
- 1990: Uncle Tom's Cabin
- 1991: Back to Normal
- 1991: I Ain't Yo Uncle
- 1992: Social Work
- 1993: Offshore
- 1994: Big Wind
- 1994: Escape to Cyberia
- 1994: Revenger Rat Meets the Merchant of Death
- 1995: Coast City Confidential
- 1996: Gotta Get A Life
- 1996: Soul Suckers from Outer Space
- 1996: 13 Days
- 1997: Killing Time
- 1997: Inside Out
- 1997: The Independent Female
- 1997: Teen City
- 1998: The Artist Must Take Sides
- 1998: Damaged Care
- 1999: City For Sale
- 1999: 40th Retrospective

=== 2000s ===
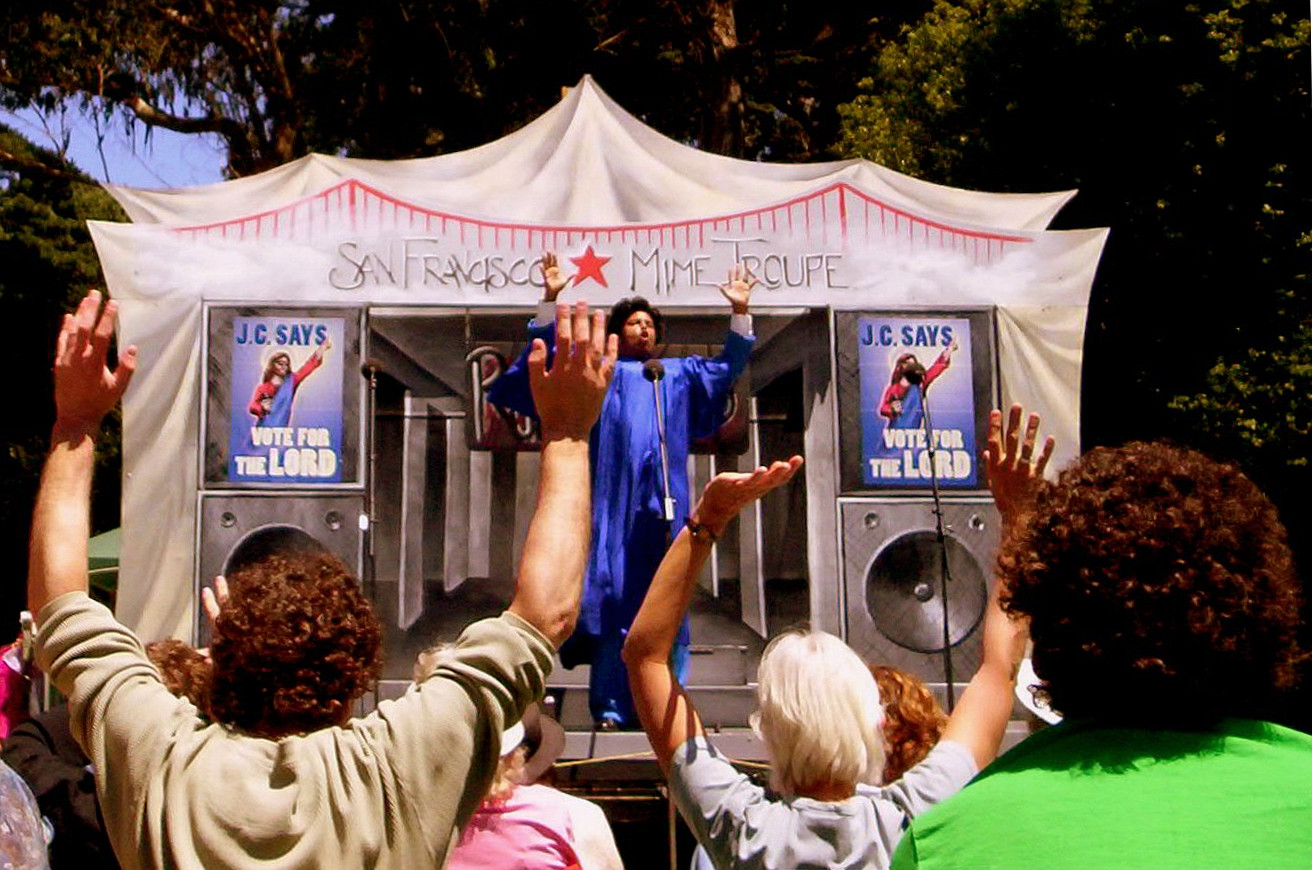
2006 performance of Godfellas

- 2000: Eating it
- 2001: 1600 Transylvania Avenue
- 2002: Mr. Smith Goes to Obscuristan
- 2003: Veronique of the Mounties
- 2004: Showdown at Crawford Gulch
- 2005: Doing Good
- 2006: Godfellas
- 2007: Making a Killing
- 2008: Red State
- 2009: Too Big to Fail

=== 2010s ===
- 2010: Posibilidad or Death of the Worker
- 2011: 2012 - The Musical!
- 2012: For the Greater Good, or The Last Election
- 2013: Oil & Water
- 2014: Ripple Effect
- 2015: Freedomland
- 2016: Schooled
- 2017: Walls
- 2018: Seeing Red
- 2019: Treasure Island

=== 2020s ===
- 2020: Tales of the Resistance: Volume 1 (Note: Radio play due to the COVID-19 pandemic)
- 2021: Tales of the Resistance: Volume 2
- 2022: Back to the Way Things Were
- 2023: Breakdown
- 2024: American Dreams
- 2026: WRECKAGE: A Musical Tragicomedy

== Albums ==
- 1972: Fillmore – The Last Days
- 1983: The Album
- 1984: Steel Town

== See also ==
- Living Theater
- Bread & Puppet
- Teatro Campesino
- Political drama
- St. Stupid's Day
- Beach Blanket Babylon

== Sources ==
- Davis, R.G. (1975). The San Francisco Mime Troupe: The First Ten Years. Palo Alto, CA: Ramparts Press. ISBN 0-87867-059-9.
