= The Digger Papers =

1960s publication in San Francisco, United States

- Staff writers: Chester Anderson; Peter Berg
- Publisher: Diggers/The Communications Company
- First issue: Fall 1965
- Final issue: August 1968
- Based in: San Francisco, California, U.S.

The Digger Papers was a free collective publication of the Diggers, one of the 1960s improvisational theatre groups in San Francisco's Haight-Ashbury district. The magazine was first published in Fall 1965. Peter Berg was one of the regular contributors to the publication.

One of the first Digger activities was the publishing of various broadsides, which were printed by sneaking into the local Students for a Democratic Society office and using their Gestetner printer. The leaflets were eventually called The Digger Papers, and soon morphed into small pamphlets with poetry, psychedelic art, and essays. They often included statements that mocked the prevailing attitude of the counterculture promoted by less radical figures like the Haight-Independent Proprietors (HIP), Timothy Leary, and Richard Alpert. The first paper mocked the acid community, saying, "Time to forget because flowers are beautiful and the sun's not yellow, it's chicken!" The Digger Papers originated such phrases as "Do your own thing" and "Today is the first day of the rest of your life." Articles rarely included authors' names, though some had pseudonyms like "George Metevsky," a reference to the "Mad Bomber" George Metesky.

In the early part of 1967, writers Chester Anderson and Claude & Helene Hayward helped form the Communications Company (ComCo), the publishing arm of the Diggers. Using two "Gestetner mimeograph machines that had been nefariously obtained through the offices of Ramparts magazine," ComCo took over publication of The Digger Papers.

The last issue of The Digger Papers, published in August 1968, featured a reprint of Richard Brautigan's poem, "All Watched Over by Machines of Loving Grace."
