= John Connell (artist) =

American artist (1940–2009)

John Connell (25 June 1940 – September 27, 2009) was an American artist. His works included sculpture, painting, drawing, and writing.

== Life and work ==
Connell was born in Atlanta, Georgia. He attended Brown University, in Providence, RI (1958–1960), the Art Students League, NY (1960–1961) and New York University (1962) where he studied Chinese print making. His first show was in New York in 1962.

I painted these rooms that were like drooling little flashes of leaves---a quick stroke. I made paper rooms that you would walk into and they would kind of rustle. That was an attempt at an environment. It wasn't terribly complete ... kind of like the shell. Actually, I didn't think of those as 'environments'. I didn't have that word then.

In the mid-1960s, he moved to California, where he worked as the set designer for the San Francisco Mime Troupe. In the 1970s, 1980s and 1990s, he worked primarily in the Southwestern United States, where he painted large murals and was visible in New Mexico's most respected art galleries, being part of the Santa Fe artist group Nerve and gaining a reputation for his large installations. He is particularly well known for his drawings, some of which are done in charcoal and spray paint and can be as large as twenty feet high and thirty feet wide.

Connell used plaster-of-Paris in the 1980s, and later turned to tar, paper and wax, in large figurative sculptures. He also used bronze, cement, wood, and chicken wire. His works on paper sometimes include elements of collage. In the early 1980s, he mostly gave up using commercial paints and began making his own out of iron oxide and pigments. In later paintings, he used ashes, mud and earth. His work has also included elements of writing and occasionally audio tape.

Connell's influences included Hokusai, Rembrandt, Balzac, Dante, Giacometti and De Kooning. Buddhism is a central theme, and he cited wabi as his aesthetic.

== Death ==
Connell died on September 27, 2009, in Mariaville, Maine.

== Projects ==
Some of his better-known projects include:

- The Construction of Kuan-Yin Lake (1982–1989): A multimedia project that included sculpture, painting, writing and audio and was partially funded by the National Endowment for the Arts.
- The Raft Project (1989–1994) : A giant sculpture/painting project with painter Eugene Newmann. It was commonly perceived as being a takeoff on Géricault's The Raft of the Medusa.

== Public collections holding his work ==
- Albright-Knox Art Gallery, Buffalo, New York
- Albuquerque Museum, Albuquerque, New Mexico
- Amon Carter Museum, Fort Worth, Texas
- Arkansas Art Center, Little Rock, Arkansas
- Bates College Museum of Art, Lewiston, Maine
- Blanton Museum of Art, Austin, Texas
- The Harwood Museum of Art, Taos, New Mexico
- The Hess Collection, Napa Valley, California
- Marjorie Barrick Museum of Art, Las Vegas, Nevada
- Manetti Shrem Museum of Art, Davis, California
- Metropolitan Museum of Art, New York
- Mobile Museum of Art, Mobile, Alabama
- New Mexico Museum of Art, Santa Fe, New Mexico
- Roswell Museum and Art Center, Roswell, New Mexico
- Phoenix Art Museum, Phoenix, Arizona
- Scottsdale Center for the Arts, Scottsdale, Arizona
- University of Arizona Art Museum, Tucson, Arizona
- University Art Museum, Albuquerque, New Mexico
