= Ronald G. Davis =

Theatre director

Ronald G. Davis (1933–2026) was an American mime and theater director. He was the founder of the San Francisco Mime Troupe.
