= Generation on Fire: Voices of Protest from the 1960s =

2006 nonfiction book on US history

- Author: Jeff Kisseloff
- Subject: 1960s U.S. History
- Genre: Oral history
- Publisher: University of Kentucky Press
- Publication date: December 29, 2006
- Media type: Hardcover, ebook
- ISBN: 9780813124162

Generation on Fire: Voices of Protest from the 1960s, An Oral History by Jeff Kisseloff is a nonfiction collection of oral histories from 1960s activists and counterculture figures, published in 2006 by University of Kentucky Press.

== Background ==
Jeff Kisseloff is a journalist and oral historian who before publishing this book, had previously published two other oral histories. During the 1960s, he was too young to directly participate in anti-segregation and antiwar protests. He began this project with a focus on the history of rock 'n roll but was drawn to the descriptions of activism in the interviews and began asking about political views. He then lost his agent and his next agents had difficulties finding a publisher, but ultimately the book was published by University of Kentucky Press. Kisseloff describes the book as "a tribute to those Americans who stood up and said no to war, greed, racism, sexism, homophobia, pollution, censorship, lame music, and bad haircuts".

== Overview ==
The book is based on fifteen interviews with a variety of activists and figures from the 1960s, including Bernard Lafayette, Daniel Berrigan, Bob Zellner, Paul Krassner, Frank Kameny, Elsa Marley Skylark, Peter Berg, Verandah Porche, Gloria Richardson Dandridge, David Cline, Lee Weiner, Marilyn Salzman Webb, and a joint interview with the mother and boyfriend of Allison Krause.

Each chapter begins with an essay about the interview subject along with photographs, and each oral history is written in a narrative format without the interview questions included.

== Critical reception ==
In a review for American Studies, Amy Scott anaylzes the usefulness of the work for instructors, writing, "Interviews with Lafayette, Zellner, and Richardson Dandridge provide numerous examples of how Civil Rights activists endured brutal beatings and risked death to render racial injustice visible, thereby altering the perceptions of activists, white segregationists, and bystanders who witnessed movement activities." Ray Schuck writes in a review for The Journal of Popular Culture, "When Gloria Richardson mentions how she and others put red pepper on their legs to deter attack dogs, you understand the enormity of the struggle for equality" and that the book "should have a spot reserved on the bookshelves of all who want never to forget the price paid for freedom and equality in America."

In The Oral History Review, Zachary M. Schrag writes "it seems not to have occurred to him that conservatives of the era also fought for what they believed was right" and states the lack of interviews with opposing sides "missed the chance to draw parallels between clashing worldviews." Eric J. Morgan, in Material Culture, also asks, "Where, for example, are the forces of Barry Goldwater, the influence of Phyllis Schlafly, or the rise of the Christian Right?" Morgan also describes the collection, despite "some glaring and obviously biased omissions", as "a fine collection of remembrances from one of the most contentious eras in American history."

In a review for The Register of the Kentucky Historical Society, Caroline Hoefferle describes the book as "ideal" for high school and undergraduate history students, and states, "Kisseloff's approach of writing the stories from the perspective of the interviewee may be a little problematic in terms of teaching students how to analyze primary sources, but a short discussion of his journalistic methodology may clear this issue up and make the chapters useful nonetheless." In a review for H-Net, James Eichsteadt extends praise to Kisseloff for the development of the oral histories, including the interview questions chosen and the editing afterwards: "the fact that each interview reads so effortlessly, entertainingly, and with such authenticity is a testament not only to the storytelling abilities of the interviewees, but to Kisseloff's behind-the-scenes work in shaping the final product." Publishers Weekly writes, "While Kisseloff's clumsy introductions to each entry may err on the side of campy, the testimonies themselves more than make up for it in substance and spirit."
