= Paying the Price for Peace: The Story of S. Brian Willson =

2018 documentary film

- Directed by: Bo Boudart
- Written by: Allan Baddock, Susan Utell, Sharon Wood
- Produced by: Bo Boudart, Frank Dorrel
- Starring: S. Brian Willson
- Narrated by: Peter Coyote
- Cinematography: Bo Boudart
- Edited by: Susan Utell
- Music by: Malcolm Payne
- Production company: Bo Boudart Productions
- Distributed by: Cinema Libre Studio
- Release dates: October 2017 (Awareness Film Festival); 1 October 2018 (United States)
- Running time: 96 minutes
- Country: United States
- Language: English

Paying the Price for Peace: The Story of S. Brian Willson is a 2017 American documentary film directed by Bo Boudart that chronicles the life and activism of S. Brian Willson, a Vietnam War veteran and anti-war activist. The film focuses on Willson’s non-violent protest at the Concord Naval Weapons Station in 1987, where he was severely injured by a military train, and explores the broader U.S. peace movement. Narrated by Peter Coyote, it features interviews with prominent activists, including Daniel Ellsberg, Medea Benjamin, and Ron Kovic, and incorporates archival footage and music from artists like Joan Baez and Jackson Browne.

== Synopsis ==
Paying the Price for Peace: The Story of S. Brian Willson documents the transformation of S. Brian Willson from a Vietnam War veteran to a prominent peace activist. The film centers on his 1987 protest at the Concord Naval Weapons Station in California, part of the Nuremberg Actions opposing U.S. military involvement in Central America during the Iran-Contra affair. On September 1, 1987, Willson and other activists blocked railroad tracks expecting the train to stop. Instead, the train, ordered not to stop, accelerated and struck Willson, resulting in the amputation of both legs and severe injuries. In a September 2016 KPFA radio interview, Willson described the protest as a non-violent effort to expose U.S. military support for the Nicaraguan Contras. In a March 2016 KBOO interview, he emphasized the protest’s alignment with his broader commitment to peace activism.

The documentary uses archival footage, news reports, and interviews with activists such as Daniel Ellsberg, Medea Benjamin, and Ron Kovic to contextualize Willson’s activism within the U.S. peace movement, from the Vietnam War to conflicts in Iraq and Afghanistan. It highlights organizations like Veterans for Peace, Codepink, and World Beyond War, emphasizing their roles in anti-war advocacy. The soundtrack, featuring music by Joan Baez, Jackson Browne, and Creedence Clearwater Revival, underscores the film’s themes of resistance.

== Cast ==
- S. Brian Willson – Vietnam War veteran and anti-war activist.
- Medea Benjamin – Co-founder of Codepink.
- Daniel Ellsberg – Whistleblower known for the Pentagon Papers.
- Ron Kovic – Vietnam War veteran and author of Born on the Fourth of July.
- Peter Coyote – Narrator, actor, and activist.
- Leah Bolger – Former U.S. Navy commander and peace activist.
- Blase Bonpane – Activist and host of World Focus.
- Roy Bourgeois – Founder of School of the Americas Watch.
- Phil Donahue – Talk show host.
- Bruce Gagnon – Coordinator of the Global Network Against Weapons & Nuclear Power in Space.
- David Hartsough – Co-founder of Nonviolent Peaceforce.
- Charles Liteky – Former U.S. Army chaplain and peace activist.
- Maggie Martin – Peace and social justice activist.
- Camilo Mejia – Conscientious objector and anti-war activist.
- Daniel Ortega – President of Nicaragua.
- Cindy Sheehan – Anti-war activist.
- Martin Sheen – Actor and activist.
- David Swanson – Anti-war author and journalist.
- Alice Walker – Author and activist.
- Mary Ann Wright – Retired U.S. Army colonel and diplomat.

== Production ==
Director Bo Boudart, inspired by S. Brian Willson’s story, initiated the project to highlight Willson’s activism and the broader peace movement. The film was produced by Bo Boudart Productions. Archival footage was sourced from news reports, Donahue show interviews, and peace activism events, with additional interviews conducted with key figures in the anti-war movement.

== Release ==
Paying the Price for Peace was first screened publicly on March 10, 2016, at the Chalice Unitarian Universalist Congregation in Escondido, California. Additional Bay Area screenings occurred in September 2016, including showings on September 6, 2016, at the Grand Lake Theater in Oakland, California, at 7:00 PM and 9:30 PM, co-sponsored by KPFA and Occupy Oakland, and an event on September 16, 2016, at the Fellowship of Humanity Hall in Oakland, co-sponsored by KPFA, followed by a Q&A with S. Brian Willson. The film officially premiered at the Awareness Film Festival in Los Angeles in October 2017. It was also screened at the United Nations Association Film Festival at Stanford University and the Free Speech Film Festival in Philadelphia. International screenings included a national premiere in Belgium on November 16, 2017, at L’Aventure in Brussels, hosted by GRIP and other peace organizations. A community screening took place on November 11, 2024, at West Shore Unitarian Universalist Church in Rocky River, Ohio, hosted by Veterans for Peace.

Distributed by Cinema Libre Studio, the film was released digitally in 2017 on platforms like Films for Action, followed by Apple TV, Amazon Prime Video, and Vimeo on Demand in 2018. It was made available in full on YouTube by Bayview Entertainment on May 7, 2025.

== Reception ==
The film received generally positive reviews, though its controversial themes restricted its mainstream exposure. People’s World praised its portrayal of Willson’s courage and its contribution to peace discourse. San Francisco Chronicle highlighted the film’s vivid depiction of Willson’s 1987 protest and its impact on anti-war activism. *Truthdig* described it as a “dramatic and informative” work, though noting its appeal may be strongest among those already sympathetic to anti-war causes. Eugene Weekly emphasized its alignment with the International Day of Peace and its role in documenting Willson’s transformation. Street Roots advocated for its use in educational settings to inspire peace advocacy. *Video Librarian* gave it 2.5 out of 4 stars, noting its compelling narrative but limited scope. Vietnam Full Disclosure lauded its “epic story of courage and commitment,” while Mark R. Leeper rated it 7/10, praising its anti-war narrative but noting potential bias.

On Rotten Tomatoes, the film has a user rating of 7/10 based on limited reviews. On Amazon Prime Video, it holds a 4.1/5 rating based on 11 user reviews, though such ratings are not considered reliable by Wikipedia standards.

== Accolades ==
- Grand Jury Award for Best Documentary Feature, Awareness Film Festival, Los Angeles, 2017.
- Best Documentary, Brasov International Film Festival & Market, Romania, 2017.

== See also ==
- School of the Americas Watch
