= Brian Willson =

American Vietnam veteran & peace activist (born 1941)

- Born: S. Brian Willson; July 4, 1941 (age 85)
- Education: private college (B.A.); American University (J.D.)
- Occupations: Lawyer, activist

S. Brian Willson (born July 4, 1941) is a U.S. American Vietnam veteran, peace activist, and attorney.

Willson served in the US Air Force from 1966 to 1970, including several months as a combat security officer in Vietnam. He left the air force as a captain. He subsequently became a member of Vietnam Veterans Against the War and Veterans For Peace. Upon completion of law school at American University in Washington, D.C., he became a member of the District of Columbia Bar. Willson has had a variety of jobs, including penal consultant, prisoner rights advocate, dairy farmer, legislative aide, town tax assessor and building inspector, veteran's advocate, and small businessman.

As a trained lawyer and writer, he has documented U.S. policy in nearly two dozen countries. Since 1986, Willson has studied on-site policies in a number of countries, among them Nicaragua, El Salvador, Honduras, Panama, Brazil, Argentina, Mexico, Colombia, Ecuador, Cuba, Haiti, Iraq, Israel and the Palestinian territories, Japan, and North and South Korea. Documenting the pattern of policies that he says "violate U.S. Constitutional and international laws prohibiting aggression and war crimes," Willson has been an educator and activist, teaching about the dangers of these policies. He has participated in lengthy fasts, actions of nonviolent civil disobedience, and tax refusal along with voluntary simplicity.

In 1987 he was seriously injured while blocking railroad tracks in protest against US weapons shipments to Central America. Willson was hit by a train, ultimately losing both legs below the knee.

== Senate aide ==
He was prisoner rights aide to Massachusetts State Senator Jack Backman, served on Massachusetts Governor Michael Dukakis' homeless veterans and Agent Orange task forces, and worked with Massachusetts Lt. Governor John Kerry on Agent Orange and other veterans' issues, later becoming a volunteer for Kerry's first U.S. Senatorial campaign in 1984. After Kerry's victory, Willson was appointed to his veterans advisory committee.

== Concord protest and injuries ==
On September 1, 1987, while engaged in a protest against the shipping of U.S. weapons to Central America in the context of the Contra wars, Willson and other members of a Veterans Peace Action Team blocked railroad tracks at the Concord, California, Naval Weapons Station. An approaching train did not stop, and struck the veterans. Willson was hit, ultimately losing both legs below the knee while suffering a severe skull fracture with loss of his right frontal lobe. Subsequently, he discovered that he had been identified for more than a year as an FBI domestic "terrorist" suspect under President Reagan's anti-terrorist task force provisions and that the train crew that day had been advised not to stop the train. Three days after Willson lost his legs over 10,000 people gathered in support of Willson, and against arms shipments to Central America.

For years after the incident, anti-war protesters maintained a 24-hour-a-day vigil at the weapons depot, which shipped between 60,000 and 120,000 tons of munitions each year to U.S. forces and allies, a Navy spokesman said.

Willson filed a lawsuit contending that the Navy and individual supervisors were given ample warning of their plan to block the tracks, and that the train crew had time to stop—which the subsequent official Navy report confirmed. The train crew filed a lawsuit against Willson, requesting punitive damages for the "humiliation, mental anguish, and physical stress" they suffered as a result of the incident, which was dismissed. U.S. District Judge Robert Peckham said Willson did not plan to cause the railroad workers any distress, because he assumed the train would stop before hitting him.

Willson agreed in 1990 to settle his lawsuit against the government and train crew for $920,000.

Minneapolis folk-punk group Boiled in Lead dedicated their version of the traditional Irish antiwar ballad "My Son John," from their 1989 album From the Ladle to the Grave, to Willson.

== Organizations ==
Willson helped create Veterans Education Project (VEP) in Massachusetts; Vietnam Veterans Peace Education Network (VVPEN) in New England; National Federation of Veterans For Peace (NFVFP) in 1986 in Washington, DC; Veterans Fast For Life (VFFL) in 1986 on steps of the US Capitol, a water-only fast that concluded after 47 days, which led to the four fasters being placed on a domestic "terrorist" watch list; Veterans Peace Action Teams (VPAT) in 1987, training and sending observation and work teams into Nicaragua and El Salvador, a project that lasted 3 years; Nuremberg Actions at Concord, CA in 1987; Institute For the Practice of Nonviolence in 1988 in San Francisco; and The People's Fast For Justice and Peace in the Americas, a 42-day water fast on the steps of the US Capitol in 1992. Willson was an early member of Veterans for Peace.

== Writing and film-making ==
While working for Massachusetts Senator Jack Backman, he investigated brutality at Walpole State Prison for more than a year, concluding in an official report called "An Exercise In Torture."

In 1988, a documentary, The Healing of Brian Willson was produced by Idanha Films.

In 2016, a documentary, Paying the Price for Peace: The Story of S. Brian Willson was produced and directed by filmmaker Bo Boudart.

His short autobiography, On Third World Legs, was published by Charles Kerr, 1992.

His psychohistorical memoir, Blood on the Tracks: The Life and Times of S. Brian Willson was published by PM Press in 2011.

His third major book, Don't Thank Me For My Service: My Vietnam Awakening to the Long History of U.S. Lies was published in 2018 by Clarity Press.

== Awards ==
Willson is the recipient of many awards for his peace and justice activities, and was awarded the Peace Abbey Courage of Conscience Award at the Kennedy Library and Museum on September 26, 1992.

== Bibliography ==
- Willson, S. Brian (1992). On Third World Legs. Charles H. Kerr. OCLC 26788556.
- Willson, S. Brian (1998). The Slippery Slope: U.S. Military Moves Into Mexico. S.B. Willson. OCLC 77553747.
- Willson, S. Brian (2011). Blood on the Tracks: The Life and Times of S. Brian Willson. PM Press. ISBN 9781604865929. OCLC 747410575.
- S. Brian Willson (November 15, 2018). Don't Thank Me For My Service: My Vietnam Awakening to the Long History of U.S. Lies. SCB Distributors. ISBN 978-0-9998747-4-5.

== See also ==
- Ron Kovic
- Norman Morrison
- Charlie Liteky
- Roy Bourgeois
- Ben Linder
- GI Coffeehouses
- GI Underground Press
- Rachel Corrie
- Addicted To War
- List of peace activists
