= The American Buffalo =

American documentary television mini-series

- Genre: Documentary
- Created by: Ken Burns
- Written by: Ken Burns; Dayton Duncan
- Directed by: Ken Burns
- Narrated by: Peter Coyote
- Country of origin: United States
- No. of episodes: 2

Production
- Running time: 120 minutes (each episode)
- Production companies: Florentine Films; WETA-TV

Original release
- Network: PBS
- Release: October 16, 2023

The American Buffalo is a 2023 two-part documentary television mini-series about the American bison directed by Ken Burns.

== Episodes ==
No.	Title	Directed by	Written by	Original release date
1	"Blood Memory"	Unknown	Unknown	October 16, 2023
2	"Into the Storm"	Unknown	Unknown	October 16, 2023
