= Emmett Grogan =

American anarchist (1942–1978)

- Grogan, photographed by John Dominis.
- Born: Eugene Leo Grogan; November 28, 1942; Bay Ridge, Brooklyn, New York, U.S.
- Died: April 1, 1978 (aged 35); Coney Island, Brooklyn, NY
- Other name: Kenny Wisdom
- Occupations: Activist, Author
- Known for: The Diggers
- Notable work: Ringolevio, a Life Played for Keeps (1972); Final Score (1976)
- Spouse: Louise Latraverse
- Children: 1 son

Emmett Grogan (born Eugene Leo Grogan, November 28, 1942 – April 1, 1978) was a founder of the Diggers, a radical community-action group of Improvisational actors in the Haight-Ashbury district of San Francisco. The Diggers took their name from the English Diggers (1649–1650), a radical movement opposed to feudalism, the Church of England and the British Crown.

== Biography ==
Grogan's distrust of the mainstream media made it difficult for reporters to acquire more than a few details of his life. He was born on November 28, 1942, as Eugene Leo Grogan into an Irish-American family in the Bay Ridge neighborhood of Brooklyn, New York. According to his publisher, New York Review Books, "Grogan grew up on New York City’s mean streets, getting hooked on heroin before he was in his teens, kicking the habit and winning a scholarship to a swanky Manhattan private school, pursuing a highly profitable sideline as a Park Avenue burglar, then skipping town to enjoy the dolce vita in Italy." After high school, he attended Duke University for one year before moving to San Francisco.

The San Francisco Diggers evolved out of two radical traditions that thrived in the Bay Area in the mid-1960s: the bohemian/underground art/theater scene, and the New Left/civil rights/peace movement. The Diggers combined street theatre, direct action, and art happenings in their social agenda of creating a Free City. Their most characteristic activities were distributing free food ("Free because it's yours!") every day in Golden Gate Park, and distributing "surplus energy" at a series of Free Stores, where everything in the store was free.

The Diggers coined various slogans that became part of the counterculture and even the larger society, such as, "Do your own thing," and "Today is the first day of the rest of your life."

Grogan's 1972 autobiography Ringolevio, a Life Played for Keeps, is regarded by some as the best and only authentic book written about the underground culture of the 1960s. In the book, Grogan refers to himself by the alias Kenny Wisdom. In his 1990 introduction to Ringolevio, Peter Coyote, another founding member of the Diggers, states that Grogan's choice of the alias is "no accident", as the protagonist stood in for the young Grogan's "undirected self".

Grogan was also the author of Final Score, a crime novel published in 1976.

== Criticism of counterculture ==
Grogan shunned media attention and became increasingly suspicious of those who sought publicity. In Ringolevio, Grogan discussed the 1967 Human Be-In, criticizing counterculture luminaries Timothy Leary, Jerry Rubin, and especially Abbie Hoffman.

Grogan thought the HIP (Haight Independent Proprietors) merchants, led by Ron and Jay Thelin, who had sponsored events like the Human Be-In, were the primary beneficiaries of the events: "The HIP merchants were astounded by their own triumph by promoting such a large market for their wares. They became the Western world's taste makers overnight..." He objected to the "Summer of Love" enticing of young people to the Haight-Ashbury to experience hippie life, noting that an influx of residents would cause an "immigration crisis" and the kids who came expecting an already-formed Utopia would end up living a desperate hand-to-mouth existence on the streets. He also decried the HIP merchants' "HIP Job Co-Op," revealing that much of the work they offered was sweatshop labor. He pointed out that unskilled and clerical jobs would be taken away from poor residents who depended on such work to survive.

== Death ==
On April 6, 1978, 35-year-old Grogan was found dead on a New York City Subway train on the F train in Coney Island; he had suffered a heart attack. Close friend and Digger co-founder Peter Coyote stated in his foreword to Grogan's autobiography Ringolevio that his death was due to a heroin overdose.

Bob Dylan dedicated his 1978 album Street Legal to Grogan. Richard Brautigan dedicated his poem "Death Is a Beautiful Car Parked Only" to Grogan.

== Personal life ==
Grogan was married to the French-Canadian actress Louise Latraverse; they had one son.
