= Summer of Love =

1967 social phenomenon in San Francisco

- Part of the Counterculture of the 1960s and the hippie movement
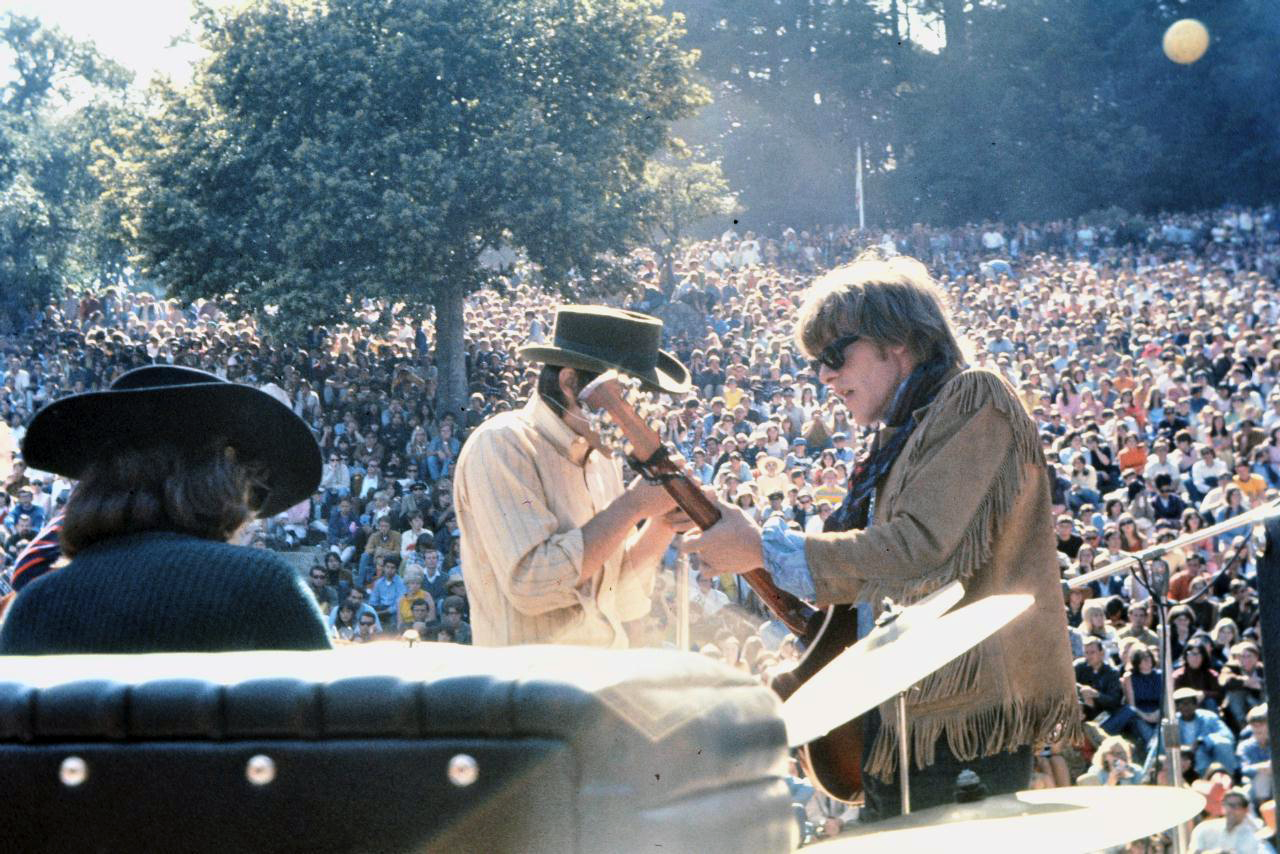
- Spencer Dryden, Marty Balin, and Paul Kantner of Jefferson Airplane performing at the Fantasy Fair, early June 1967
- Date: 1967
- Location: Haight-Ashbury, Golden Gate Park, San Francisco
- Participants: ~100,000 (estimated)
- Outcome: A surge in 1960s counterculture in the United States; Inspiration for the Second Summer of Love in the United Kingdom in 1988

The Summer of Love was a major social phenomenon that occurred in San Francisco during the summer of 1967. As many as 100,000 people, mostly young people, hippies, beatniks, and 1960s counterculture figures, converged in San Francisco's Haight-Ashbury district and Golden Gate Park.

More broadly, the Summer of Love encompassed hippie culture, spiritual awakening, hallucinogenic drugs, anti-war sentiment, and free love throughout the West Coast of the United States, and as far away as New York City. An episode of the PBS documentary series American Experience referred to the Summer of Love as "the largest migration of young people in the history of America".

Hippies, sometimes called flower children, were an eclectic group. Many opposed the Vietnam War, were suspicious of government, and rejected consumerist values. In the United States, counterculture groups rejected suburbia and the American way and instead opted for a communal lifestyle. Some hippies were active in political organization, whereas others were passive and more concerned with art (music, painting, poetry in particular) or spiritual and meditative practices. Many hippies took interest in Indian religions, such as Hinduism and Buddhism.

== Background ==
=== Culture of San Francisco ===
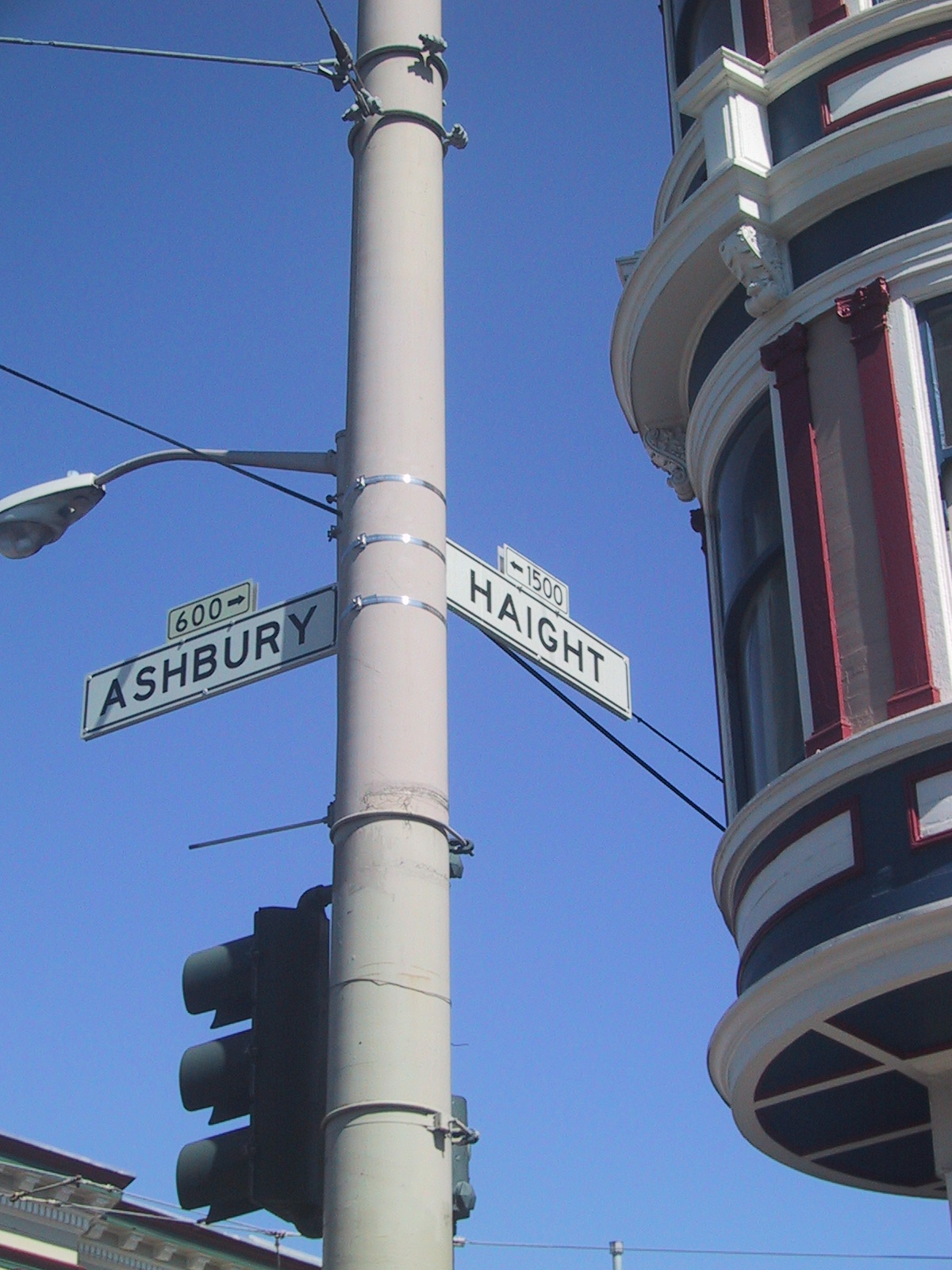
Intersection of Haight Street and Ashbury Street, the upper Haight neighborhood, San Francisco, celebrated as the central location of the Summer of Love

Inspired by Jack Kerouac's On the Road (1957) and the Beat Generation of authors of the 1950s, who had flourished in the North Beach area of San Francisco, those who gathered in Haight-Ashbury during 1967 allegedly rejected the conformist and materialist values of modern life and adhered to the psychedelic movement; there was an emphasis on sharing and community. The Diggers established a Free Store, and Haight Ashbury Free Clinics was founded on June 7, 1967, where medical treatment was provided.

=== Human Be-In and inspiration ===
The prelude to the Summer of Love was a celebration known as the Human Be-In at Golden Gate Park on January 14, 1967, which was produced and organized by artist Michael Bowen.

It was at this event that Timothy Leary voiced his phrase, "turn on, tune in, drop out". This phrase helped shape the entire hippie counterculture, as it voiced the key ideas of 1960s rebellion. These ideas included experimenting with psychedelics, communal living, political decentralization, and dropping out of society. The term "dropping out" became popular among many high school and college students, many of whom would abandon their conventional education for a summer or more of hippie culture.

The event was announced by the Haight-Ashbury's hippie newspaper, the San Francisco Oracle:

A new concept of celebration beneath the human underground must emerge, become conscious, and be shared, so a revolution can be formed with a renaissance of compassion, awareness, and love, and the revelation of unity for all mankind.

The gathering of approximately 30,000 at the Human Be-In helped publicize hippie fashions.

=== Planning ===
The term "Summer of Love" originated with the formation of the Council for the Summer of Love during the spring of 1967 as a response to the convergence of young people on the Haight-Ashbury district. The council was composed of the Family Dog hippie commune, The Straight Theatre, The Diggers, The San Francisco Oracle, and approximately 25 other people, who sought to alleviate some of the problems anticipated from the influx of young people expected during the summer. The council also assisted the Free Clinic and organized housing, food, sanitation, music and arts, along with maintaining coordination with local churches and other social groups. Psychedelic poster artist Bob Schnepf was commissioned by Chet Helms to create the official Summer of Love poster, which became a lasting icon of the era.

== Beginning ==
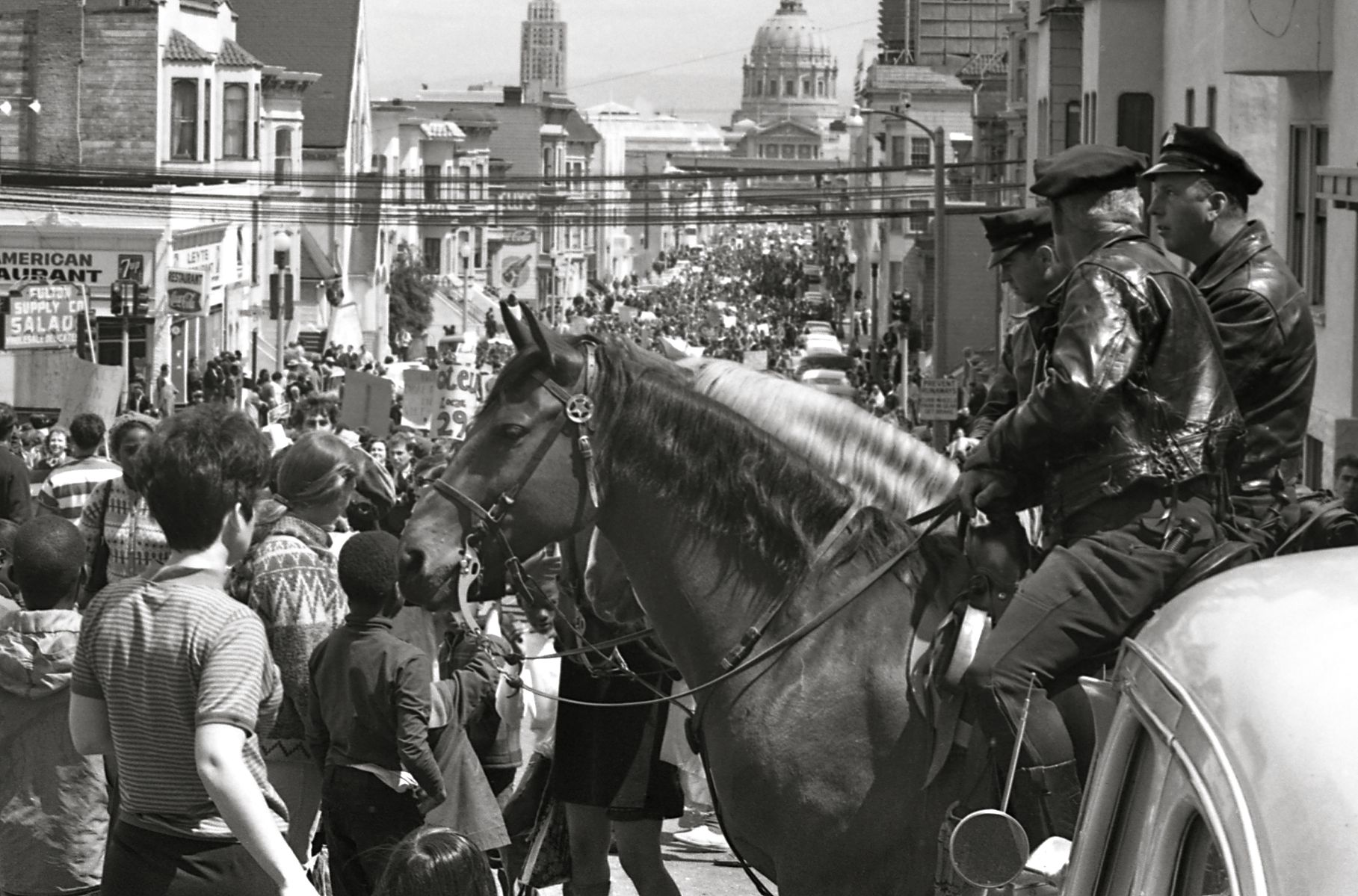
Spring Mobilization against the War in Vietnam march, from Second and Market Street to Kezar Stadium, looking towards City Hall, on Fulton Street, in San Francisco, on April 15, 1967

=== Youth arrivals ===
College students, high school students, and runaways began streaming into the Haight during the spring break of 1967. John F. Shelley, the then-Mayor of San Francisco and the San Francisco Board of Supervisors, determined to stop the influx of young people once schools ended for the summer, unwittingly brought additional attention to the scene, and a series of articles in the San Francisco Examiner and San Francisco Chronicle alerted the national media to the hippies' growing numbers. By spring, some Haight-Ashbury organizations including Diggers theater and about 25 residents responded by forming the Council of the Summer of Love, giving the event a name.

"You only had to walk out your door to join the fun"—Mike Lafavore

=== Popularization ===
The media's coverage of hippie afflux in the Haight-Ashbury drew the attention of youth from all over America. Hunter S. Thompson termed the district "Hashbury" in The New York Times Magazine. On February 6, 1967, Newsweek printed a four-page four-color article titled "Dropouts on a Mission". On March 17, 1967, Time magazine printed an article "Love on Haight". On June 12, 1967, Newsweek printed "The Hippies are Coming". The activities in the area were reported almost daily.

The event was also reported by the counterculture's own media, particularly the San Francisco Oracle, the pass-around readership of which is thought to have exceeded a half-million people that summer, and the Berkeley Barb.

The media's reportage of the "counterculture" included other events in California, such as the Fantasy Fair and Magic Mountain Music Festival in Marin County and the Monterey Pop Festival, both during June 1967. As many as 40,000 people may have attended the Magic Mountain festival. At Monterey, approximately 30,000 people gathered for the first day of the music festival, with the number increasing to 60,000 on the final day. Additionally, media coverage of the Monterey Pop Festival facilitated the Summer of Love as large numbers of hippies traveled to California to hear favorite bands such as the Who, Grateful Dead, the Animals, Jefferson Airplane, Quicksilver Messenger Service, the Jimi Hendrix Experience, Otis Redding, the Byrds, and Big Brother and the Holding Company featuring Janis Joplin.

In August of 1967, George Harrison visited San Francisco to visit the group of Haight-Ashbury hippies. He walked around the area strumming his guitar and interacted with the group. Many of the hippies asked him questions and were very excited to meet him as well as feeling that they had a kinship to him. He later described this experience in not the best light, as to him this environment was horrible and filled with bums.

=== "San Francisco (Be Sure to Wear Flowers in Your Hair)" ===
The musician John Phillips of the band the Mamas & the Papas wrote the song "San Francisco (Be Sure to Wear Flowers in Your Hair)" for his friend Scott McKenzie. It served to promote both the Monterey Pop Festival that Phillips was helping to organize, and to popularize the flower children of San Francisco. Released on May 13, 1967, the song was an instant success. By the week ending July 1, 1967, it reached number four on the Billboard Hot 100 in the United States, where it remained for four consecutive weeks. Meanwhile, the song charted at number one in the United Kingdom and much of Europe. The single is purported to have sold more than seven million copies worldwide.

=== Diggers ===
The radical activist group called the Diggers embedded themselves in San Francisco in 1966. The group were anarchists who wanted to help other youth find liberation in the city. In addition to their free store, the group created a free publication called The Digger Papers in which they spread their message. In The Digger Papers the group provided information on resources for food, shelter, drug use, and human rights information. Their message was to develop a free society, everything they created or endorsed was free, and to further their messages about life and how to live it.

== Events ==
=== New York City ===
In Manhattan, near the Greenwich Village neighborhood, during a concert in Tompkins Square Park on Memorial Day of 1967, some police officers asked for the music's volume to be reduced. In response, some people in the crowd threw various objects, and 38 arrests ensued. A debate about the "threat of the hippie" ensued between Mayor John Lindsay and Police Commissioner Howard R. Leary. After this event, Allan Katzman, the editor of the East Village Other, predicted that 50,000 hippies would enter the area for the summer.

=== California ===
As many as 100,000 young people from around the world flocked to San Francisco's Haight-Ashbury district, as well as to nearby Berkeley and to other San Francisco Bay Area cities, to join in a popularized version of the hippie culture. A Free Clinic was established for free medical treatment, and a Free Store gave away basic necessities without charge to anyone who needed them.

The Summer of Love attracted a wide range of people of various ages: teenagers and college students drawn by their peers and the allure of joining an alleged cultural utopia; middle-class vacationers; and even partying military personnel from bases within driving distance. The Haight-Ashbury could not accommodate this influx of people, and the neighborhood scene quickly deteriorated, with overcrowding, homelessness, hunger, drug problems, and crime afflicting the neighborhood.

=== Denver ===
Chet Helms, Barry Fey and others who were constructing The Family Dog Denver in the summer of 1967 also held a Human Be-In, in Denver's City Park, with the goal of harnessing the Summer of Love vibe to promote Helm's new Family Dog Productions venture, which opened in September, 1967. 5,000 people attended the Be-In, with performances by bands like the Grateful Dead, Odetta and Captain Beefheart. Ken Kesey and Timothy Leary were also reportedly in attendance. As Denver native Bruce Bond states in the 2021 documentary The Tale of the Dog, "It's not like the Summer of Love ended in Frisco. It just moved east, to Denver."

== Use of drugs ==
Psychedelic drug use became common. Grateful Dead guitarist Bob Weir commented:

Haight Ashbury was a ghetto of bohemians who wanted to do anything—and we did but I don't think it has happened since. Yes there was LSD. But Haight Ashbury was not about drugs. It was about exploration, finding new ways of expression, being aware of one's existence.

After losing his untenured position as an instructor on the Psychology faculty at Harvard University, Timothy Leary became a major advocate for the recreational use of psychedelic drugs. After starting to take psilocybin in the late fifties, a psychoactive chemical produced by certain mushrooms that causes effects similar to those of LSD, Leary endorsed the use of all psychedelics for personal development. He often invited friends as well as an occasional graduate student to consume such drugs along with him and colleague Richard Alpert, who would eventually become better known as spiritual guru Ram Dass.

On the West Coast, author Ken Kesey, a prior volunteer for a CIA-started LSD experiment in 1959, advocated the use of LSD. Soon after participating, he was inspired to write the bestselling novel One Flew Over the Cuckoo's Nest. Subsequently, after buying an old school bus, painting it with psychedelic graffiti and attracting a group of similarly minded individuals he dubbed the Merry Pranksters, Kesey and his group traveled across the country, hosting "acid tests" where they would fill a large container with a diluted low dose form of the drug and give out diplomas to those who passed their test.

Along with LSD, cannabis started to be much used during this period. However, new laws were subsequently enacted to control the use of both drugs. The users thereof often had sessions to oppose the laws, including The Human Be-In referenced above as well as various "smoke-ins" during July and August; however, their efforts at repeal were unsuccessful.

== Funeral and aftermath ==
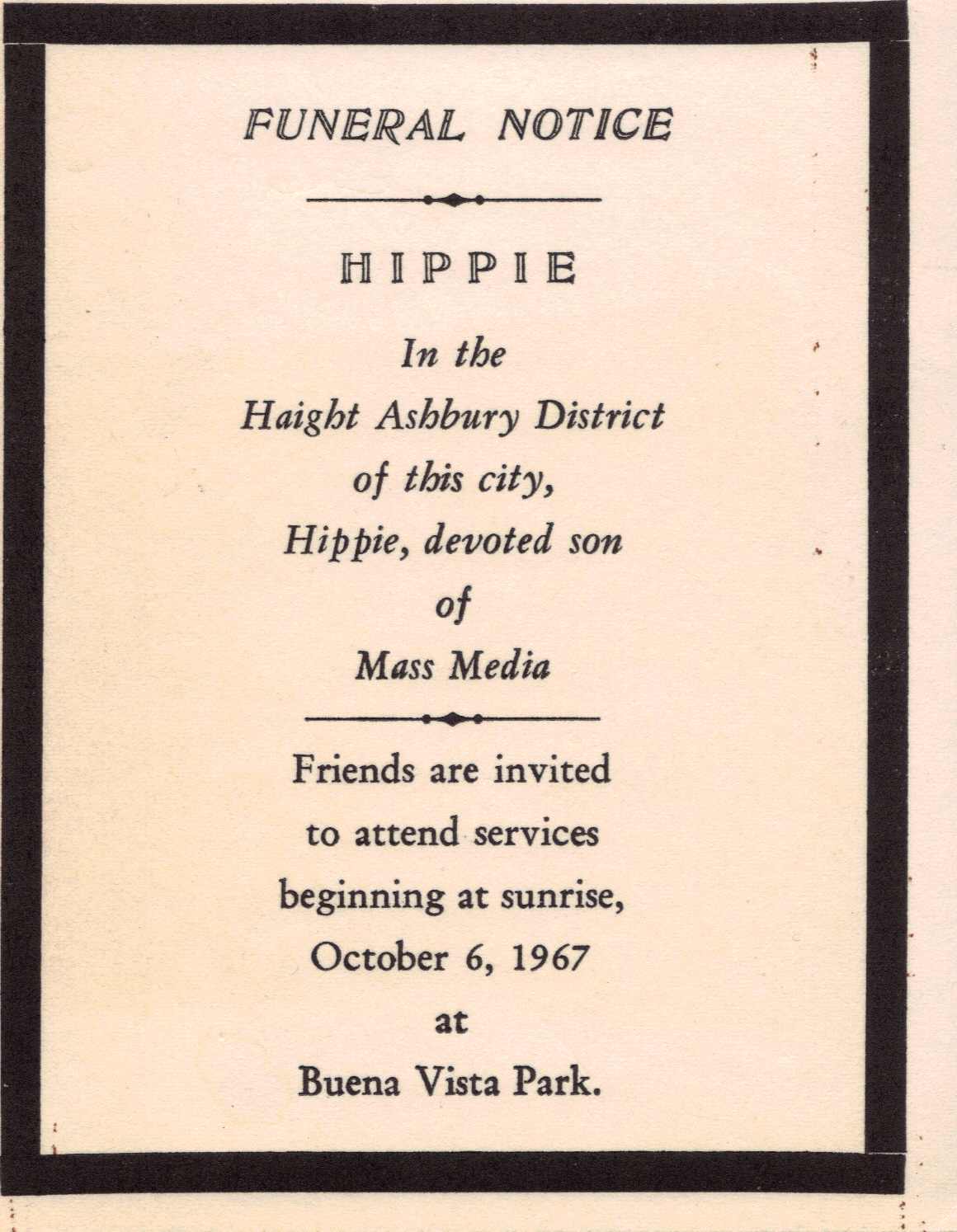
Mock funeral notice

By the end of summer, many participants had left the scene to join the back-to-the-land movement of the late 1960s, to resume school studies, or simply to "get a job". Those remaining in the Haight wanted to commemorate the conclusion of the event. A mock funeral entitled "The Death of the Hippie" ceremony was staged on October 6, 1967, and organizer Mary Kasper explained the intended message:

We wanted to signal that this was the end of it, to stay where you are, bring the revolution to where you live and don't come here because it's over and done with.

In New York, the rock musical drama Hair, which told the story of the hippie counterculture and sexual revolution of the 1960s, began Off-Broadway on October 17, 1967.

== Legacy ==
=== Second Summer of Love ===
The "Second Summer of Love" (a term which generally refers to the summers of both 1988 and 1989) was a renaissance of acid house music and rave parties in Britain. The culture supported MDMA use and some LSD use. The art had a generally psychedelic emotion reminiscent of the 1960s.

=== Soviet "Flower Children" ===
Behind the Iron Curtain, hippies inspired a counter-cultural movement, "Flower Children", nicknamed for the flowers typically worn in their hair. The hippies' boho fashion style, anti-war, and even expressions, such as "Make love, not war," were used by the Flower Children. While they took inspiration from hippies in fashion, beliefs and protest, they used it to protest the particular repression they faced under a pre-perestroika Soviet Union.

=== 40th anniversary ===
During the summer of 2007, San Francisco celebrated the 40th anniversary of the Summer of Love by holding numerous events around the region, culminating on September 2, 2007, when over 150,000 people attended the 40th anniversary of the Summer of Love concert, held in Golden Gate Park in Speedway Meadows. It was produced by 2b1 Multimedia and the Council of Light.

=== 50th anniversary ===
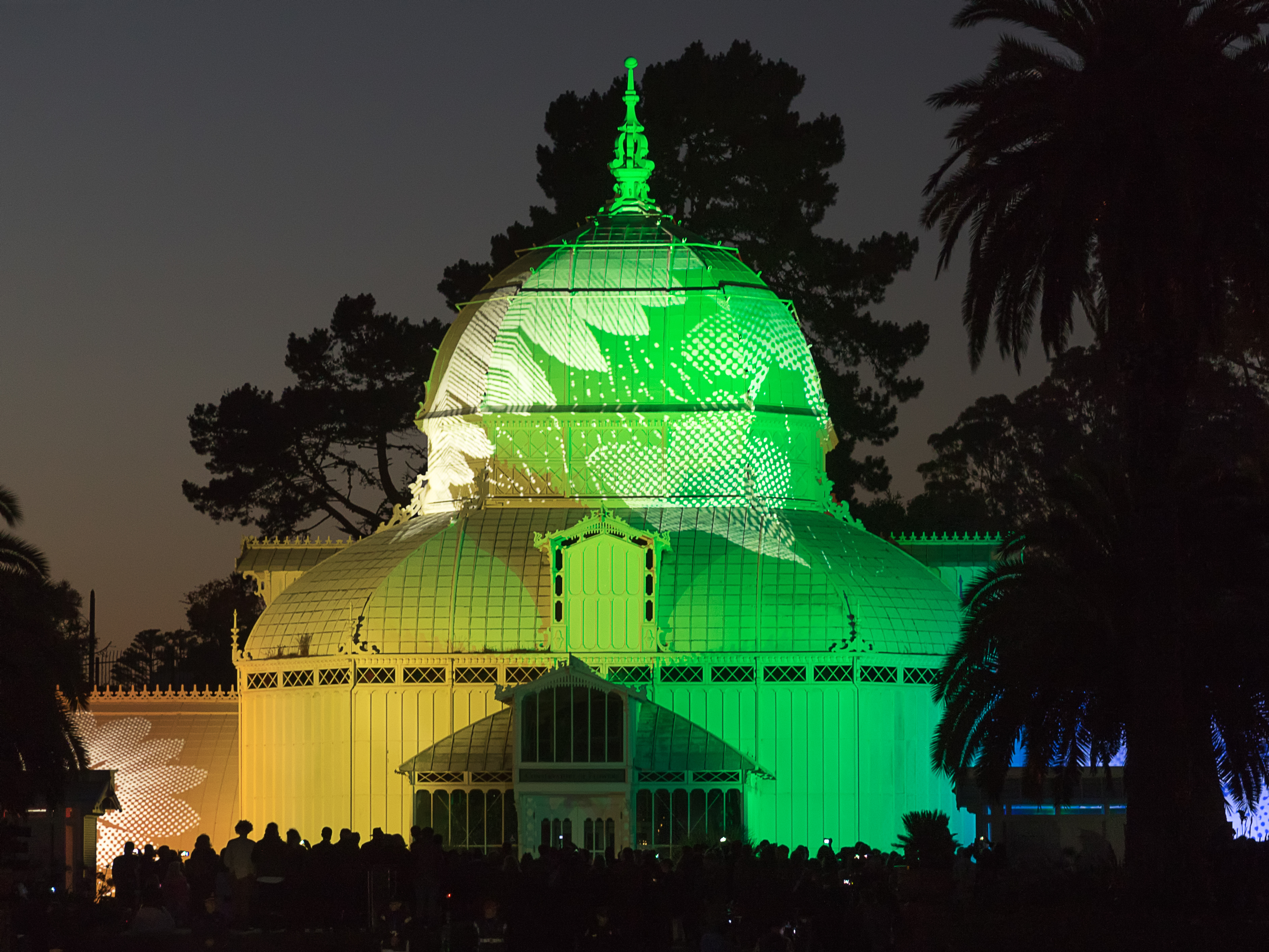
Illumination of the Conservatory of Flowers on June 21, 2017

In 2016, 2b1 Multimedia and The Council of Light, once again, began the planning for the 50th Anniversary of the Summer of Love in Golden Gate Park in San Francisco. By the beginning of 2017, the council had gathered about 25 poster artists, about 10 of whom submitted their finished art, but it was never printed. The council was also contacted by many bands and musicians who wanted to be part of this historic event, all were waiting for the date to be determined before a final commitment. New rules enforced by the San Francisco Parks and Recreational Department (PRD) prohibited the council from holding a free event of the proposed size. There were many events planned for San Francisco in 2017, many of which were 50th Anniversary-themed. However, there was no free concert. The PRD later hosted an event originally called "Summer Solstice Party," but it was later renamed "50th Anniversary of the Summer of Love" two weeks before commencement. The event had fewer than 20,000 attendees from the local Bay Area.

In frustration, producer Boots Hughston put the proposal of what was by then to be a 52nd anniversary free concert into the form of an initiative intended for the November 6, 2018, ballot. The issue did not make the ballot; however, a more generic Proposition E provides for directing hotel tax fees to a $32 million budget for "arts and cultural organizations and projects in the city."

During the summer of 2017, San Francisco celebrated the 50th anniversary of the Summer of Love by holding numerous events and art exhibitions. In Liverpool, the city has staged a 50 Summers of Love festival based on the 50th anniversary of the June 1, 1967, release of the album Sgt Pepper's Lonely Hearts Club Band, by the Beatles.

== See also ==
- Counterculture of the 1960s
- 1967 in music
- Acid rock
- Allen Ginsberg
- David Peel
- Deadhead
- Central Park be-ins
- Commune
- Grateful Dead
- Hippies
- Jefferson Airplane
- George Harrison
- John Lennon
- Neil Young
- Nick St. Nicholas
- Psychedelia
- Psychedelic rock
- Season of the Witch: Enchantment, Terror, and Deliverance in the City of Love
