= Saint Stupid's Day Parade =

Annual parade in San Francisco, California

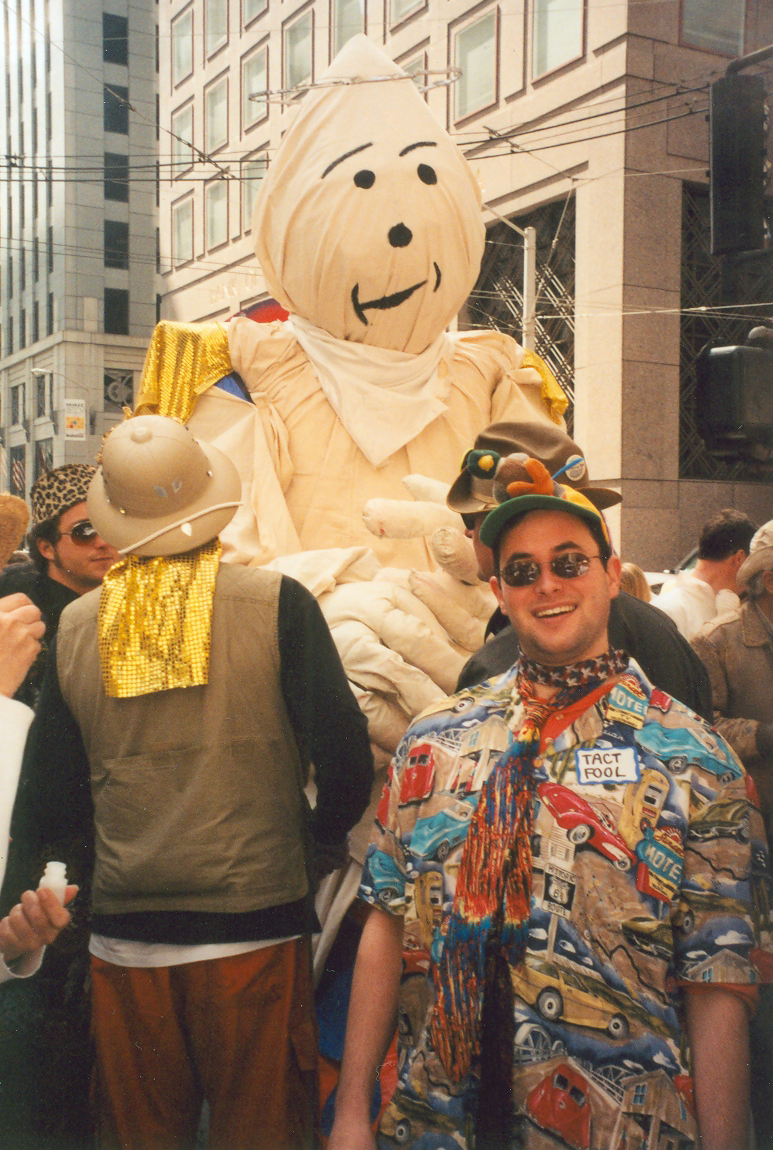
At the annual Saint Stupid's Day Parade on April 1, 2001

The Saint Stupid's Day Parade is an annual parade in San Francisco on April 1. It was founded by Ed Holmes (Bishop Joey of the First Church of the Last Laugh) in the late 1970s with the understanding that one of the unifying bonds in society is stupidity. If April 1 falls on a weekday, the parade starts at the foot of Market Street and follows a route through the financial district. If April 1 falls on a weekend, the parade starts at the Transamerica Pyramid, proceeds up Columbus Avenue and ends at Washington Square. The parade begins at noon. The parade includes free lunch, confetti, flags and costumes.
