= Season of the Witch: Enchantment, Terror, and Deliverance in the City of Love =

2012 book by David Talbot

- First edition
- Author: David Talbot
- Genre: History
- Published: 2012
- Publisher: Free Press

Season of the Witch: Enchantment, Terror, and Deliverance in the City of Love is a history book by author David Talbot. The book describes the history of San Francisco from the 1960s to the early 1980s utilizing a “kaleidoscopic narrative” and tells the story of how "the 1967 Summer of Love gave way to 20 or so winters of discontent."

== Contexts ==
Season of the Witch is broken down into three sections, each one depicting a different period within the city.

=== Enchantment ===
The story starts off with what San Francisco is best known for within its history: hippie kids and their drugs that lead to the birthplace of many social movements and the rise of the Counter Culture.

=== Terror ===
This section discusses multiple violent events the City endured. Including the Hells Angels involvement in the chaos at the Alatmont Free Concert; the Zodiac and Zebra serial killers; the assassination of George Moscone and Harvey Milk, and the political ascension of Dianne Feinstein to the City’s mayoralty.

=== Deliverance ===
The book concludes with the riots that followed and the AIDS epidemic that was just heating up.

=== Appendix: The Best Songs Recorded by San Francisco Bands, 1965-1985 ===
Talbot concludes the book with what he considers to be the best and most influential songs recorded during 1965–1985. Songs by San Francisco natives like The Grateful Dead and Jefferson Airplane are included in this list.

== One City One Book ==
The San Francisco Public Library selected Season of the Witch as their One City One Book 2015 selection.

== Published ==
Season of the Witch was published by Free Press (NYC) on May 8, 2012.

== Reviews ==
Season of the Witch received starred reviews in Publishers Weekly and Kirkus Reviews, and was hailed as "enthralling, news-driven history" (San Francisco Chronicle), "energetic, highly entertaining storytelling" (Boston Globe), and "an enthralling – and harrowing – account of how the 1967 Summer of Love gave way to 20 or so winters of discontent" (Washington Post).
