= Little Hollywood, San Francisco =

Little Hollywood
- Neighborhood of San Francisco
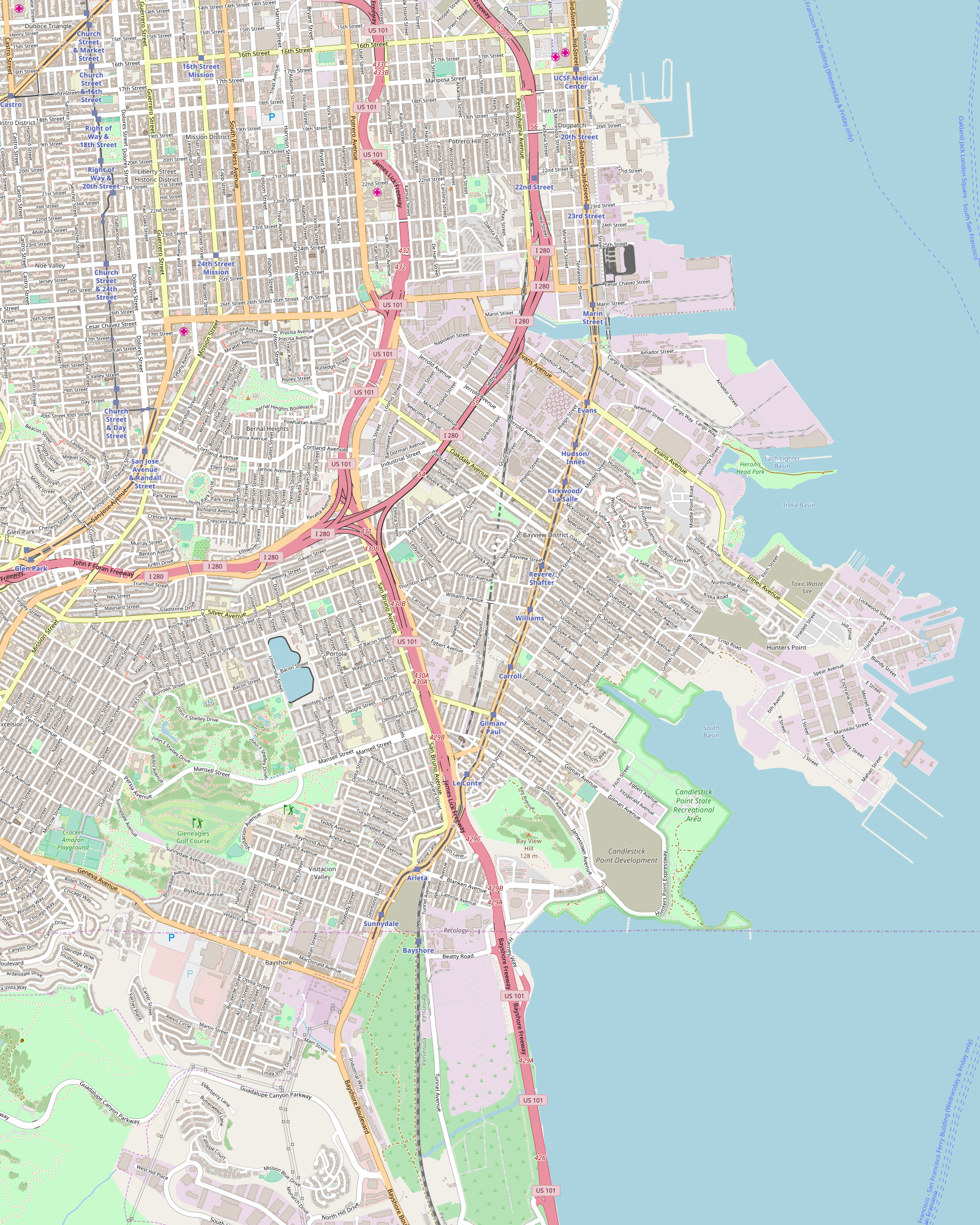
- Location within San Francisco Little Hollywood (San Francisco County) Little Hollywood (San Francisco Bay Area)
- Coordinates: 37.71145°N 122.39843°W

Government
  - Supervisor: Shamann Walton
  - CA Assembly: Matt Haney (D)
  - State Senator: Scott Wiener (D)
  - U.S. Rep.: Kevin Mullin (D)

Area
  - Total: 0.25 km^{2} (0.098 sq mi)

Population (2016)
  - Total: 1,165
  - Density: 4,600/km^{2} (12,000/sq mi)
- Time zone: UTC-8 (PST)
  - Summer (DST): UTC-7 (PDT)
- ZIP Code: 94134
- Area codes: 415/628

Little Hollywood is a small neighborhood in the southeastern edge of San Francisco. It is centered around Blanken Avenue between Bayshore Boulevard and U.S. Route 101.

== History ==
The area was developed by the Crocker Estate Company in the early 1920s in what was then called the "Bayshore Tract" — "'where land and water meet,' a reference to nearby Candlestick Cove."

The name is derived from the architectural style of the first houses built in the neighborhood back in the late 1920s and early 1930s, many of them resembling homes in the Hollywood Hills.

== Attractions and characteristics ==
Little Hollywood Park is located on Lathrop Avenue. The park was dedicated to resident Clarence Fleming in 1983 for helping establishing the park.

The Bayshore Caltrain station is just south of the neighborhood, on Tunnel Avenue.

The neighborhood is adjacent to the Recology trash collection and processing site. A sculpture garden was established on the southern hill dividing the neighborhood from the site in 1992. It features artworks made from discarded material found at the trash center.

Local legend claims Classical Hollywood star Mae West once owned a getaway home at the corner of Blanken and Tocoloma avenues, dubbed "Casa Bahia Loma." However, little evidence have been found supporting this claim. It was reported that the Mission Revival styled home was actually built by the owner of the Lucky Lager brand of beer in 1933 for his brewmaster. The brewery was about a mile north on Bayshore Boulevard.

== Gallery ==
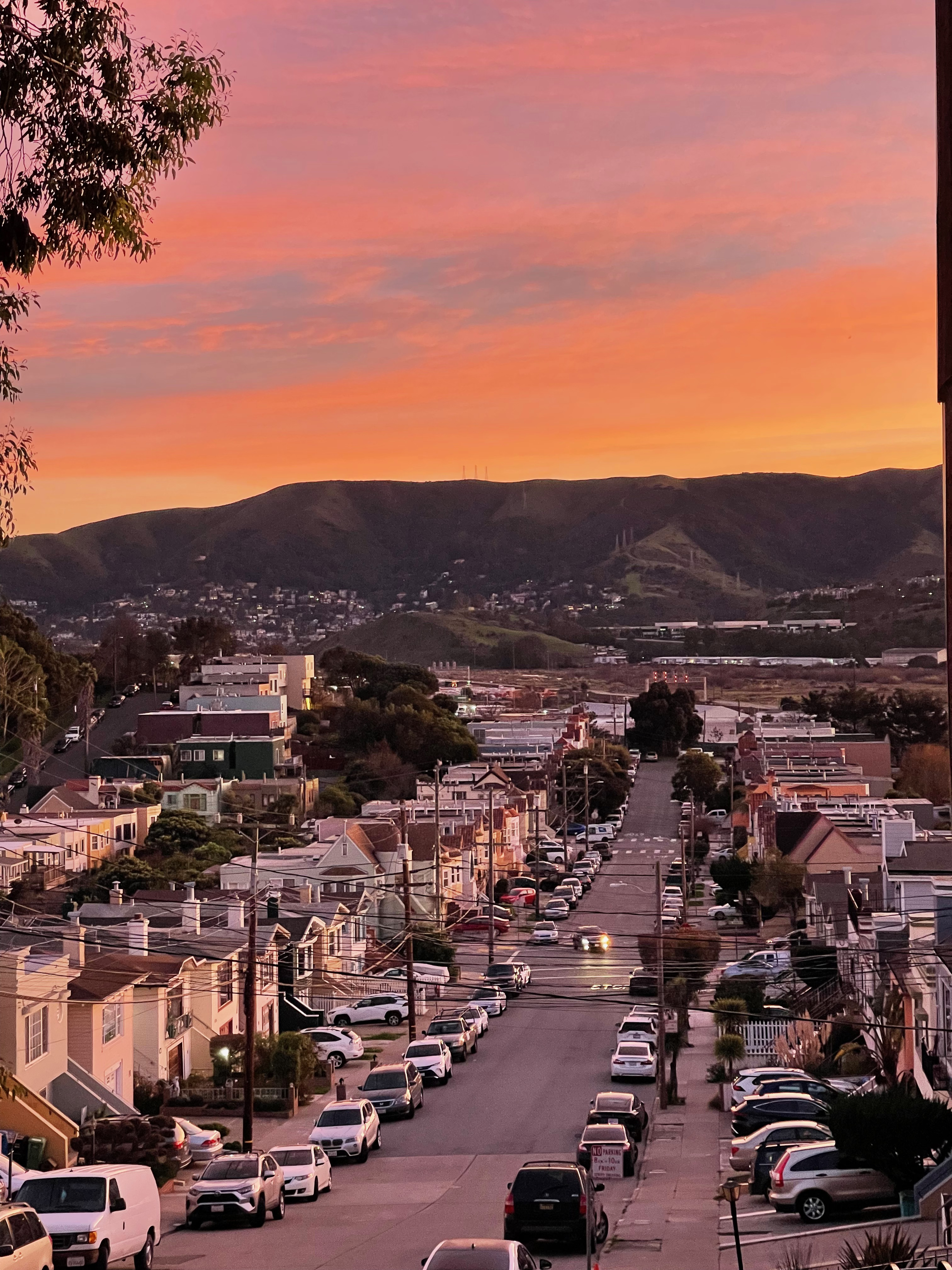
A southward view of Peninsula Ave., taken from Hester Ave. at sunset

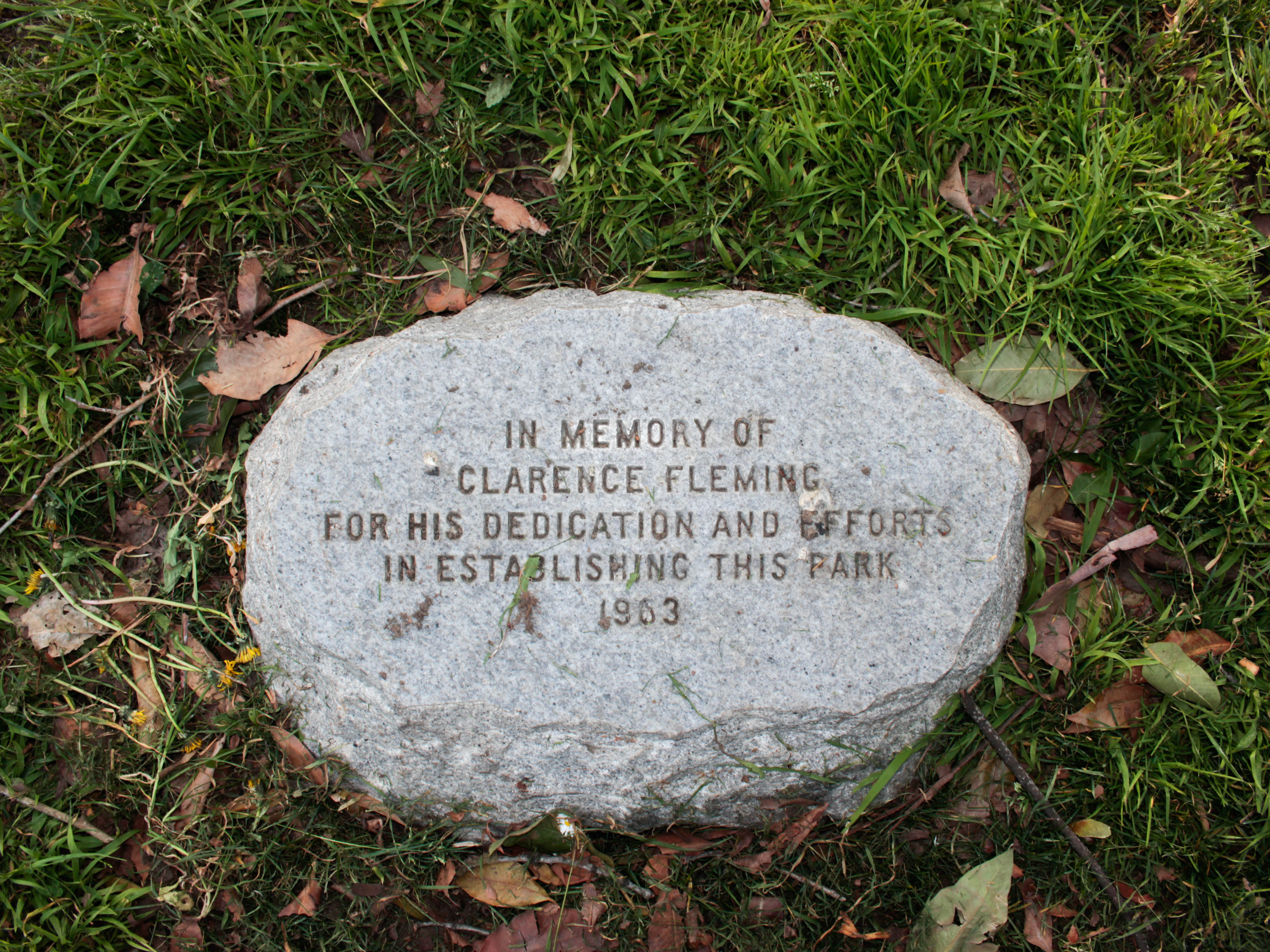
Clarence Fleming Memorial Stone at Little Hollywood Community Park
