= Peter Berg (bioregionalist) =

American writer

Peter Stephen Berg (October 1, 1937 – July 28, 2011) was an environmental writer, best known as an advocate of the concept of bioregionalism. In the early 1960s, he was a member of the San Francisco Mime Troupe and the Diggers. He is the founder of the Planet Drum Foundation.

== Early life and education ==
Born on October 1, 1937, in Jamaica, Queens, New York, Berg was raised in Florida after moving there at age six, which was where he first became interested in the environment as a child. He began attending the University of Florida at age 16, after winning a scholarship to study psychology. He dropped out at age 17, hitchhiked to San Francisco, and then enlisted and served in the army. After his discharge, he moved back to New York. After becoming active in the civil rights movement, he hitchhiked to San Francisco in 1964.

In San Francisco, he joined the San Francisco Mime Troupe and met Judy Goldhaft. He also became a founder of the Artists Liberation Front and the Diggers. According to the San Francisco Chronicle in 2011, he "was the primary writer for the Diggers, penning terse, scathingly funny anticapitalist position papers and exhorting the city to prepare for the coming mass arrival of young hippies now known as the Summer of Love." In The Sixties: Years of Hope, Days of Rage, Todd Gitlin recounts Berg leading a small group of Diggers in June 1967 to disrupt a speech by Tom Hayden at a gathering for the Students for a Democratic Society, with Berg declaring "Property is the enemy, burn it, destroy it, give it away," while other Diggers shut out the lights and recited poetry. In 2007, Berg told CBS News, "The media, to a large extent had created this 'hippie' who was a person making a 'V for Victory' sign with a silly grin, and wearing 50 buttons that said this and that. That wasn't what a lot of us were doing."

== Bioregionalism and Planet Drum ==
In 1969, Berg, Goldhaft, and their daughter traveled around the United States. In the 2006 book Generation on Fire: Voices of Protest from the 1960s, Berg told oral historian Jeff Kisseloff, "More and more it occurred to me that the most important question to consider was the position of human beings in natural systems." After Berg attended the 1972 United Nations Conference on the Environment, he developed bioregionalism as a concept. He defined a bioregion as "a geographic area defined by natural characteristics, including watersheds, landforms, soils, geological qualities, native plants and animals, climate, and weather...[which] includes human beings as a species in the interplay of these natural characteristics." He wrote books and essays about how the concept relates to environmental sustainability.

He founded Planet Drum in 1973, which became an organization that engages in education programs and urban garden and sustainability projects. Planet Drum networks bioregional groups, both in the United States and internationally.

== Personal life and death ==
Judy Goldhaft was his life partner. After suffering from lung cancer, he died from pneumonia in 2011.

== Selected work ==
- Envisioning Sustainability, Discovering Your Life-Place: A First Bioregional Workbook (2009)
- A Green City Program for the San Francisco Bay Area and Beyond, Planet Drum Foundation/Bookpeople, ISBN 0914728717 (1987)
- Figures of Regulation: Guides for Re-Balancing Society with the Biosphere (1982)
- Reinhabiting a Separate Country: A Bioregional Anthology of Northern California (1978)
