= Kansas Bowling =

American filmmaker and actress

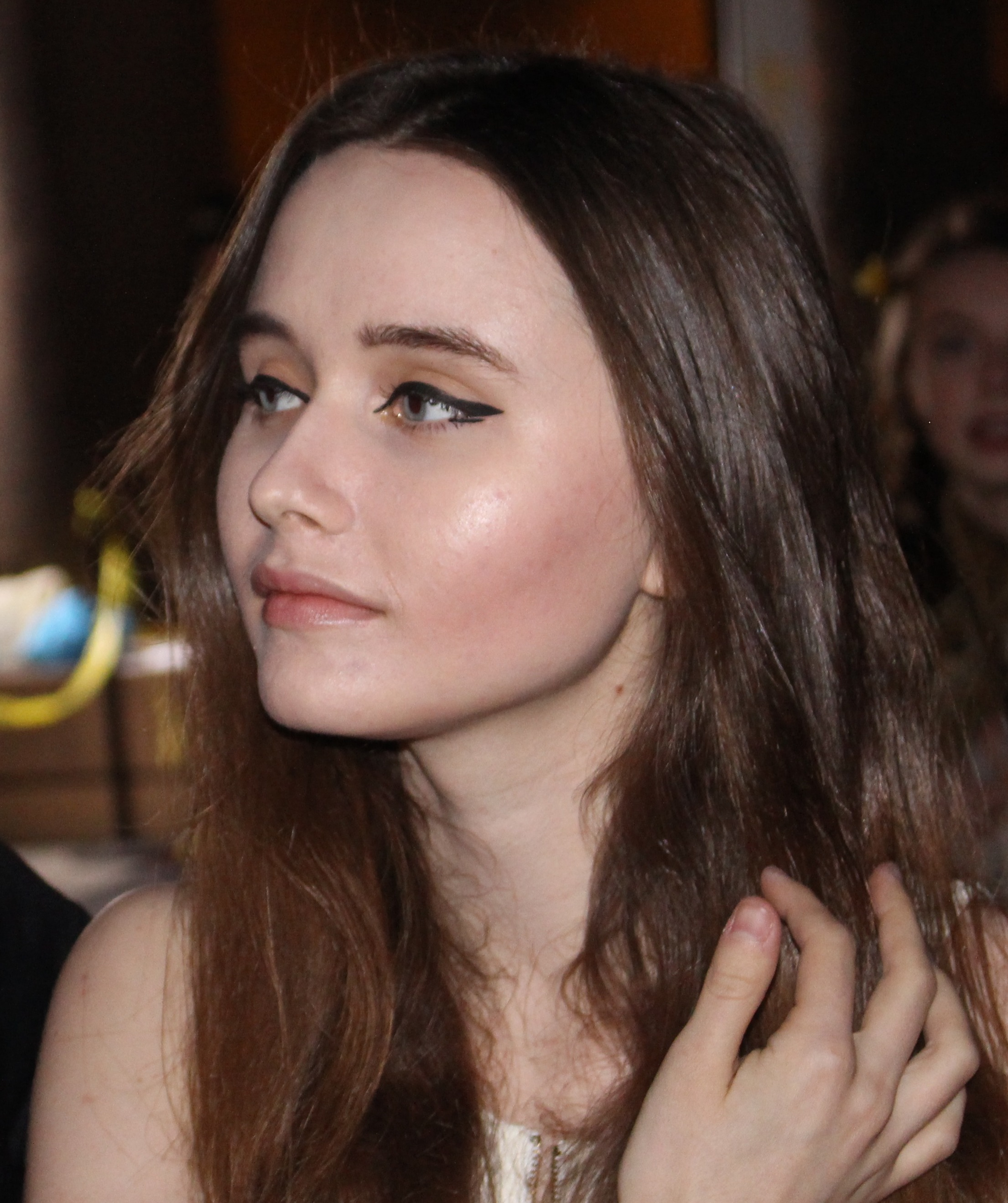
- Bowling in 2016
- Born: August 2, 1996 (age 30); Los Angeles, California, U.S.
- Occupations: Film director; screenwriter; cinematographer; actress
- Years active: 2015–present
- Known for: B.C. Butcher, Cuddly Toys

Kansas Bowling (born August 2, 1996) is an American film director, screenwriter, cinematographer, and actress. She is best known for directing B.C. Butcher (2016) and Cuddly Toys (2022) and acting in Once Upon a Time in Hollywood (2019).

== Early life ==
Bowling was born and raised in California. Her parents are Arin Thompson and luxury real estate agent William Preston Bowling of Phoenix, Arizona. At age 13, she received a Super 8 film camera as a Christmas gift and immediately started shooting short films with her sister.

== Career ==
=== B.C. Butcher ===
Bowling directed B.C. Butcher (2016) starring Kato Kaelin, Rodney Bingenheimer, Natasha Halevi, and Kadeem Hardison. The film was produced by Lloyd Kaufman and distributed by Troma Entertainment on Blu-ray and their streaming service Troma Now on VHX.

The movie had its theatrical premiere on March 3, 2016, at Grauman's Egyptian Theatre in Hollywood, California. The premiere had a musical performance by Count Smokula and Ron Jeremy.

Bowling was the first inductee into the Troma Institute For Gifted Youth and listed as one of W Magazine's 42 up-and-comers in their April 2016 "Next in Line" issue.

=== Music videos ===
Bowling has directed over 30 music videos for various artists (shot on 8mm or 16mm film).

In the music video for Kat Meoz's "Here I Wait", Bowling shot the only existing footage of Richard Brautigan's papier-mâché bird Willard who was the subject of his 1975 novel Willard and His Bowling Trophies.

On April 13, 2018, Drangsal released a video through Universal Germany for their song "Magst Du Mich" directed by and starring Bowling and her sister Parker Love Bowling.

On August 15, 2018, Rolling Stone released a video Bowling directed for the Death Valley Girls' song "Disaster (Is What We're After)". The video is four minutes of musician Iggy Pop eating a hamburger. The video is an homage to Jørgen Leth's 1982 film 66 Scenes of America, where Andy Warhol eats a hamburger. Yahoo Entertainment named it one of their favorite videos of the year.

On October 2, 2018, Stereogum premiered another video Bowling directed for the Death Valley Girls for their song "One Less Thing (Before I Die)". Bowling attended the home-made rocket launch for the daredevil and limo driver Mad Mike Hughes and filmed his successful attempt at launching in the sky.

=== Acting ===
Bowling and her sister Parker Love Bowling starred in Jared Master's biblical period film Absolute Vow. In 2018, Bowling produced and acted in the short film Swamp Women Kissing Booth which was the first film to feature actress Kathleen Hughes, star of It Came from Outer Space, in a starring role since 1958. In 2020, Bowling starred as the protagonist, Nancy Banana alongside Bill Weeden in the parody film, Psycho Ape!, and will return for the upcoming sequel.

In 2019, she portrayed Sandra Good, a member of the Manson family, in Quentin Tarantino's Once Upon a Time in Hollywood.

Bowling appeared in Glenn Danzig's Verotika as well as Glenn Danzig's sophomore feature Death Rider in the House of Vampires, alongside Julian Sands and Devon Sawa.

In early 2020, The Killers debuted a short film to coincide with the release of their new album Imploding the Mirage starring Bowling and Griffin Dunne. Two music videos were edited of the short film for the songs "Caution" and "My Own Soul's Warning".

Bowling was featured in Joe Begos' Christmas Bloody Christmas which was released theatrically December 2022.

In 2023, the 1990s throwback slasher film The Third Saturday in October Part V premiered featuring Bowling in the lead role. Bowling is also in the lead role of the 2023 aerobics slasher film Murdercise.

=== Cuddly Toys ===
As of 2023, Bowling has been touring the United States theatrically with her film Cuddly Toys. The film has been described as a "saccharine nightmare" about taboo matters on girlhood told in a "shockumentary" style. The film stars Cynda McElvana, Brissa Monique, Parker Love Bowling, Caroline Williams, Schooly D, Don Devore, Mickey Madden, Charlotte Kemp Muhl, Charlotte Sartre, Dylan Greenberg, D.C. Douglas, Sune Rose Wagner, and Keith Allison.

=== Writing ===
Kansas Bowling has written and published two books with publisher Far West Press. Her first book A Cuddly Toys Companion details the making of her film Cuddly Toys. The second is titled Prewritten Letters For Your Convenience, which she wrote with her sister, Parker Love Bowling, when they were children and published as adults.

== Personal life ==
She is the older sister of actress Parker Love Bowling.

In 2019, Bowling sued musician Ariel Pink after he hired her to go on tour with him to film his concerts and did not pay her. Pitchfork reported that as of 2020, the case has been settled in court.

Bowling previously dated musician Don Devore.

She currently lives in Nevada.

== Filmography ==
Film

Year	Title	Writer	Director	Actor	Producer	Role
2003	Klepto	No	No	Yes	No	Nick's daughter
2016	B.C. Butcher	Yes	Yes	Yes	Yes	Model
2016	The Bridemaker	No	No	Yes	No	Bride
2017	Absolute Vow	No	No	Yes	Yes	Bithiah
2017	Curious Females	No	No	Yes	No	Tara
2017	Ghostroads – A Japanese Rock N Roll Ghost Story	No	No	Yes	No	Radio Engineer
2018	Swamp Women Kissing Booth	No	No	Yes	Yes	Sissy
2018	Reagitator: Revenge of the Parody	No	No	Yes	No	Nancy the Demon Cheerleader
2018	Primitiva	Yes	No	Yes	Yes	Katrina
2019	Verotika	No	No	Yes	No	Young Peasant Girl
2019	Once Upon a Time in Hollywood	No	No	Yes	No	"Blue"
2019	Beyond the Law	No	No	Yes	No	Chastity
2020	Psycho Ape!	No	No	Yes	No	Nancy Banana
2020	Tales From the Grave: The Movie	No	No	Yes	No	Emma
2021	Death Rider in the House of Vampires	No	No	Yes	No	Rider's Dead Sister
2022	Cuddly Toys	Yes	Yes	Yes	Yes	Professor Kansas Bowling
2022	Christmas Bloody Christmas	No	No	Yes	No	Liddy
2023	Third Saturday in October Part V	No	No	Yes	No	Maggie
2023	Murdercise	No	No	Yes	No	Phoebe
2024	Psycho Ape 2	No	No	Yes	No	Nancy Banana
2024	Spirit Riser	No	No	Yes	No	
2025	No! You're Wrong. or: Spooky Action at a Distance	No	No	Yes	No	Mary
2026	Dire Duplicity	No	No	Yes	No	
TBA	Creek Encounters	No	No	Yes	No	Evie Tucker
TBA	Bad Brain	No	No	Yes	No	TBA
TBA	Untitled True Crime Project	Yes	Yes	Yes	Yes	TBA

Television

Year	Title	Episode	Writer	Director	Actor
2017	Party Legends	"Breaking Bad Vibes" (S1E3)	No	No	Yes

Music videos

Year	Song	Artist	Credit
1998	"Believe"	K's Choice	Actor
2010	"Farmer's Daughter"	Crystal Bowersox	Actor
2014	"So Long"	Alyeska	Director
2015	"You Needed to Know"	CTZNSHP	Director
2016	"Post Teenage Angst"	Kill My Coquette	Director
2016	"Disco"	Death Valley Girls	Director
2016	"Muffins"	Them Guns	Actor
2016	"Zombie Movie"	Peter Litvin	Actor
2016	"I Just Sued the School System!"	Prince Ea	Actor
2016	"Bloom"	Papa M	Director
2017	"Spin Spin"	Tilli	Director
2017	"Flesh Flower Dream"	Tilli	Director
2017	"Always"	The Fontaines	Director
2017	"Dd"	Taffy	Director
2017	"Forever Blue"	The Moonkids	Director
2017	"L.A. Don't Love You"	Kat Meoz	Director
2017	"Murkiii"	Taffy	Director
2017	"Never Slow Down"	Livingmore	Director
2017	"The Jester"	Silas Nello	Director
2017	"Christmas in Hollywood"	Kat Meoz	Director
2018	"Disaster (Is What We're After)"	Death Valley Girls	Director
2018	"The Resort Beyond the Last Resort"	Collapsing Scenery	Director
2018	"Burn Down the Cornfield"	Collapsing Scenery	Director
2018	"Modern World"	Collapsing Scenery	Director
2018	"Here I Wait"	Kat Meoz	Director
2018	"Magst du mich"	Drangsal	Director
2018	"(One Less Thing) Before I Die"	Death Valley Girls	Director
2018	"Trashworld"	Surfbort	Director
2018	"More Dead"	Death Valley Girls	Actor
2018	"Diamond Nights"	Lauren Rocket	Director
2019	"Falling"	CRX	Director
2019	"Get Close"	CRX	Director
2019	"The Bold One"	Kristeen Young	Director
2020	"Imploding the Mirage: The Short Film"	The Killers	Actor
2020	"Caution"	The Killers	Actor
2020	"My Own Soul's Warning"	The Killers	Actor
2020	"Beam Me Up"	Lauren Rocket	Director
2021	"Corpse Grinding Man”	Harley Poe	Actor
2021	"My Sweet Lord”	George Harrison	Actor
2022	"You Already Know”	Collapsing Scenery	Director
2022	"Feathers in the Clouds”	James Marlon Magas	Director
2022	"Violence”	Headkrack	Director
2023	"Morbid Symptoms”	Collapsing Scenery ft. Tippa Lee, Avalon Lurks, and L'Espiral	Director
2023	"Shakin'”	Basic Elements	Actor

== Awards and nominations ==
Year	Award	Work	Category	Result
2020	Screen Actors Guild Award	Once Upon a Time in Hollywood	Outstanding Ensemble Cast in a Motion Picture	Nominated
2020	Independent Horror Movie Awards	Psycho Ape	Best actress	Nominated
2021	New Jersey Horror Con and Film Festival	Psycho Ape	Best actress	Nominated
2022	Lausanne Underground Film and Music Festival	Cuddly Toys	Best film	Nominated
2022	LA Live Film Festival	Headkrack: Violence	Best music video	Won
2023	GenreBlast Film Festival	Murdercise	Best actress	Nominated
