= Cuddly Toys (film) =

American independent film from 2022

- Promotional Poster
- Directed by: Kansas Bowling
- Written by: Kansas Bowling
- Produced by: Parker Love Bowling; Don De Vore; Jacob Epstein; Rob Gabriele; Joe Gallagher; Andres Garzas; Dylan Mars Greenberg; Thomas Kuo; Kalvin Madsen; Kat Meoz; Tim Pronovost; Adam Rutkowski; Daniel Trujillo; Zack Weiner
- Starring: Kansas Bowling; Cynda McElvana; Brissa Monique; Parker Love Bowling
- Cinematography: Andres Garzas
- Edited by: Kansas Bowling
- Production companies: Bitter Suite Films; Uncensored new york Crown International Pictures (Note: Logo only)
- Distributed by: Vinegar Syndrome
- Release date: 2022
- Running time: 103 minutes
- Country: United States
- Language: English

Cuddly Toys is an American independent mockumentary film written and directed by Kansas Bowling, who stars in the film alongside Parker Love Bowling, Cynda McElvana, and Brissa Monique.

A parody of white coater films, the film was shot on 16 mm film and finished in a 2K digital intermediate. It was released on Blu-ray by Vinegar Syndrome.

== Premise ==
The film is narrated by Professor Kansas Bowling as she explains the horrors of being a teenage girl to concerned parents. It is presented in the style of 60's and 70's white coater films.

== Cast ==
- Kansas Bowling as Professor Kansas Bowling
- Cynda McElvana as Maude
- Brissa Monique as Angel
- Parker Love Bowling as Cuddly Toy / Sueann
- Angel O'Connor Owens as Fay
- Marion Moseley as Harriet
- Nina Ljeti as Mickey
- Mickey Madden as Joe
- Don De Vore as Omnipresent Male
- Dylan Mars Greenberg as Wolf Sword Dice Nu Metal H
- Charlotte Sartre as Victoria
- Sune Rose Wagner as Dr. Wagner
- D.C. Douglas as Reverend Maxwell
- Keith Allison as The Groom
- Caroline Williams as Mrs. Martin
- Natasha Halevi as Luella the Pageant Host
- Schoolly D as Mmmissile
- Charlotte Kemp Muhl as Heather

== Production ==
Cuddly Toys was shot on Super 16 mm film using an Aaton LTR camera. It was filmed in various cities across the United States and Mexico.

== Release ==
The film received a Blu-ray release through Vinegar Syndrome. A limited-edition slipcover release was produced, with 3,000 units made available.

The release includes bonus features such as a commentary track with the director and behind-the-scenes featurettes.

== Reception ==
Yahoo gave it a favorable 8/10 stating, "It's not screeching bleak, cold truth at its intended viewers or dryly reciting statistics but serving it to them it in an oddball manner that draws as much from the era of YouTube & TikTok as it does from that less-than-golden era." Morbidly Beautiful wrote of the film: "If the unique and unsettling Cuddly Toys doesn't haunt you long after viewing, there may be merely stuffing where a beating heart should be." Swamp Flix gave a 3/5 review, writing, "...I can't totally dismiss the bratty outsider-art feminism of this D.I.Y. bombthrower. (...) Despite ostensibly being structured as an academic lecture, it also does a good job of avoiding direct moralist instruction, both by muddling its Feminism 101 talking points with shocks of edgelord irony and by intercutting its testimonials and re-enactments in a deliberately messy, experimental editing style. Somewhere in all its shock-value leering of underage sex & misogynist violence, there's an earnest, soul-deep interest in the inner lives of American teen girls, recalling Lauren Greenfield's portraiture of Californian teens in the 1990s."
