= Reagitator: Revenge of the Parody =

- Directed by: Dylan Greenberg
- Written by: Dylan Greenberg
- Starring: Amanda Flowers; Jurgen Azazeal Munster; Aurelio Voltaire; Alan Merrill; Schoolly D Kansas Bowling
- Music by: Matt Katz Bohen
- Distributed by: Disck Pictures
- Release date: July 1, 2017
- Running time: 118 minutes
- Country: United States
- Language: English

Reagitator: Revenge of the Parody is a 2017 American horror comedy film directed by Dylan Greenberg about a mad doctor. It is based on H.P. Lovecraft's Herbert West--Reanimator.

== Synopsis ==
A beautiful aristocrat (Amanda Flowers) is resurrected by mad doctor Orbert Wescraft (Jurgen Azazel Munster) at the request of her obsessed husband (Alan Merrill). When she rebels against the Doctor and joins a cult of the undead, it's pandemonium as the sinister creatures resurrect a giant monster to destroy all mortals. Two wacky journalists (Yolpie Kaiser, Mickala McFarlane) a mad teenage girl bent on revenge (Sofe Cote) and a perma tripping boy genius (Max Husten) must save the world.

== Cast ==
- Amanda Flowers as Claudia Merryweather
- Jurgen Azazeal Munster as Dr. Orbert Wescraft
- Aurelio Voltaire as Verum the LoveSick Butler
- Alan Merrill as Alan Merryweather
- Schoolly D as The President of the United States
- Kansas Bowling as Nancy the Demon Cheerleader
- Sofe Cote as Margaret East
- Elizabeth D'Ambrosio as Maude East
- Lloyd Kaufman as The Chief of Police
- Mr. Lobo as Narrator / The Author
- Howie Pyro as End of the World Man
- Purple Pam as Deputy Pam
