= Renegade Film Festival =

Annual event held in the Atlanta, Georgia area that specializes in genre film

- Industry: film-exhibition
- Founded: 2017
- Founder: Vanessa Ionta Wright
- Headquarters: Marietta, Georgia, United States of America
- Website: renegadefilmfest.com

The Renegade Film Festival is an annual event held in the Atlanta, Georgia area that specializes in genre film and showcases diverse and independent cinema from marginalized voices. The festival spotlights short and feature films that are typically independently produced and would not otherwise receive theatrical release. In addition to film screenings, the festival hosts panel discussions, workshops, and networking events designed to support and empower independent filmmakers.

The festival has also appeared in Adrian Tofei's top 100 genre festivals list and the MovieMaker top 50 genre festivals list.

== History ==
The Renegade Film Festival was formerly known as the Women in Horror Film Festival, which was founded in 2017. The festival was originally dedicated to specifically celebrate and support female filmmakers and writers in the horror genre. In 2021, the festival rebranded as the Renegade Film Festival in order to expand its scope and mission to include all marginalized voices and genres.

The Renegade Film Festival's mission is to promote inclusion and visibility in independent cinema, and to bring balance and equality to the film industry. The festival welcomes films made by filmmakers from diverse backgrounds, including women, people of color, members of the LGBTQ+ community, and those with disabilities. It seeks to provide a space for these filmmakers to showcase their work, connect with other filmmakers, and engage with audiences.

The festival has attracted many notable guests and judges, including: Heather Langenkamp, Robert Kurtzman, Lynn Lowry, Trina Parks, Marianne Maddalena, Adam Marcus, Amanda Wyss, Sean Gunn, and Andre Gower.

The festival has been held in different locations in the Atlanta area, with a recent focus on Marietta.

== Awards ==
The Renegade Film Festival gives out awards called Lizzies in a number of categories for short films, feature films, and unproduced screenplays.

== Notable Films ==
Some notable films that played the festival include:

2023: Give Me An A, The Once and Future Smash, Retro Freaks, Stag, End Zone 2

2022: Freaky, Take Back the Night, Maya, Souvenirs, The Winter Hunger

2020: Black Lake, The Dark Red, Cold Wind Blowing, Mass Hysteria

2018: Echoes of Fear, Bugs: A Trilogy

2017: New Nightmare, Eye For an Eye, Rave Party Massacre, Buzzard Hollow Beef, Ruin Me

== See also ==
- List of fantastic and horror film festivals
