= Fatale Collective =

Group of female horror directors

Fatale Collective is a group of female horror directors that premiered their film anthology, Fatale Collective: Bleed, in 2019. The collective was founded by Lola Blanc, Megan Rosati, Francesca Maldonado, and Danin Jacquay. Natasha Halevi and Linda Chen are also founding directors.

In 2019, Fatale Collective: Bleed premiered at FilmQuest, where it won the "Director's Award for Cinematic Achievement". It also screened at Fantastic Fest and Brooklyn Horror Film Festival.

On May 8, 2020, Fatale Collective: Bleed appeared in the horror publication Fangoria.

Fatale Collective: Bleed received distribution with Screambox in 2021.
