= Little Heroes (film) =

1999 American film

Little Heroes is a 1999 American family comedy television film directed by Henri Charr and starring Brad Sergi and Thomas Garner as two bumbling kidnappers tasked with abducting the 8-year-old son (Camryn Walling) of a tobacco company employee who is about to testify against his employers in court. The film's plot revolves around the two family dogs constantly thwarting the two kidnappers.

== Cast ==
- Thomas Garner as Carny
- Brad Sergi as Slick
- Camryn Walling as Charlie Burton
- Dean Howell as Harry Burton
- Kristine Mejia as Shelly Burton
- Erica Shaffer as Ms Bakman
- Mimi Planas as Maria
- Jeffrey Asch as Pizza delivery man
- John Colton as Tobacco company CEO

Other actors with minor roles in the film include Tirion Mortrell, Scott St. James, Heinrich James, Benoit Badot, Amber J. Lawson, Tony Lipari and Kevin Weiler

== Sequels ==
The film has two follow ups, Little Heroes 2 (2000) and Little Heroes 3 (2002). Both sequels were also television films.

== Home video release ==
Little Heroes was released on VHS and DVD. It was also released in the UK on a double feature VHS, the VHS including Little Heroes and A Kid Called Danger (1999). The two sequels Little Heroes 2 (2000) and Little Heroes 3 (2002) were also released on DVD. In the UK they were distributed on DVD under the titles Dog Story: Little Heroes 2 and Top Dogs: Little Heroes 3.

In 2019, Little Heroes and Little Heroes 2 were re-cut into Paws to the Rescue.
