= Beach Fever =

1987 film by Alexander Tabrizi

- Directed by: Alexander Tabrizi
- Story by: Francis X. Cronan; Larry W. Talbot
- Produced by: Nelson Anderson; Yakov Bentsvi; Aaron Biston
- Starring: Kato Kaelin; Rodney Ueno; Judea Brittain; Jeffrey Asch; Aaron Biston
- Release date: 1987
- Running time: 90 minutes
- Country: United States
- Language: English

Beach Fever is a 1987 English-language American comedy film that was directed by Alexander Tabrizi. It stars Kato Kaelin and Rodney Ueno with Nina Arvesen. Primarily set on the beaches of California, the film's central plot involves a father sending his son to America to find the best "pick up line" for his father. Then stumbling on a special formula that attracts girls, the plot thickens when a mad dash on the beach for this special cologne causes problems for Chat and Sake. The film was produced by Nelson Anderson, Yakov Bentsvi and Aaron Biston, written by Francis X. Cronan and Larry W. Talbot.

== Plot ==
A young Japanese entrepreneur is set on a quest by his wealthy father to find the world's best opening line in order to "get the girl". But when they stumble upon a sure-fire love potion, mayhem ensues.

== Cast ==
- Kato Kaelin as Chat Frederick IV
- Rodney Ueno as Sake
- Judea Brittain as Sandy
- Jeffrey Asch as Ernie
- Aaron Biston as Mario
- Nina Arvesen as Decent Girl number 2
