= Avital Ash =

American actor

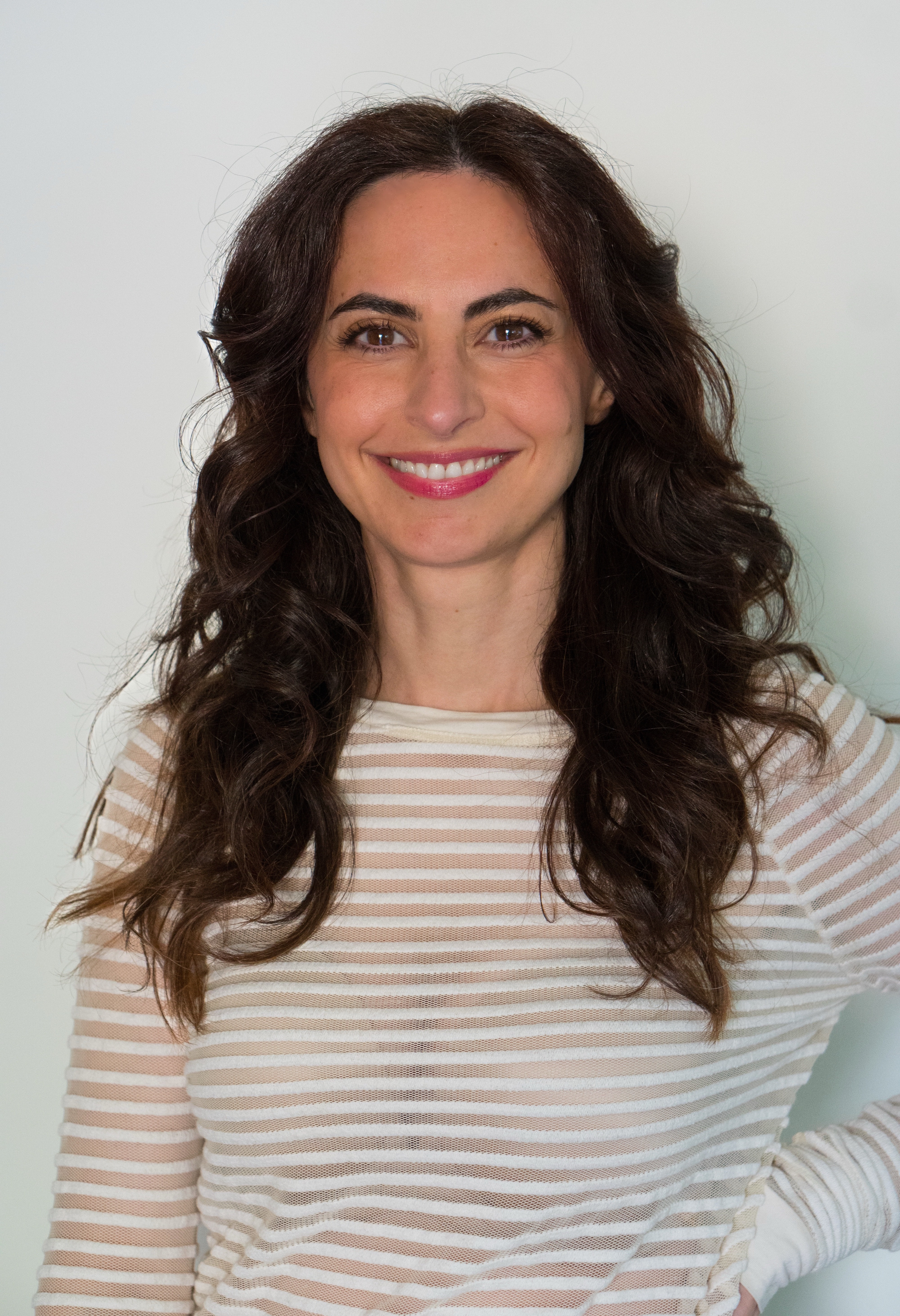
- Born: Avital Dana Ash; Miami, Florida
- Occupations: Comedian, actor, writer
- Notable work: Barry; Haunted Hotel
- Spouse: Amir Blumenfeld (m. 2023)
- Website: avitalash.com

Avital Ash is an American comedian, writer, filmmaker, and actor. She is best known for her solo show Avital Ash Workshops Her Suicide Note, which debuted at the Edinburgh Festival Fringe in 2023 and received positive reviews from The Telegraph, The Scotsman, Broadway World, The Guardian, Beyond the Joke, and Chortle.

Ash is also known for her viral stand-up clips and comedy content online, which have been featured by outlets including Vulture, BuzzFeed, and Paste.

She is also noted for her screenwriting and acting work, including as a writer for Netflix’s animated series Haunted Hotel and as writer, director, and actor of “God’s Plan,” a segment of the genre anthology film Give Me an A.

She voices a lead role in the video game Oxenfree and has appeared on television in Barry and FX’s Cake. She co-hosts the horror-comedy podcast He’s Right Behind You and frequently collaborates with her husband, comedian Amir Blumenfeld.

== Early life ==
Ash was raised in an Orthodox Jewish family in the United States.

She has spoken publicly about using comedy to navigate faith, mental health, and identity.

== Career ==
=== Stage ===
In 2023, Ash premiered her solo show Avital Ash Workshops Her Suicide Note at the Edinburgh Festival Fringe.

Blending stand-up and storytelling, the show explores themes of depression, sexuality, and memory through a mix of dark humor and candid reflection.

The production received widespread critical acclaim. The Scotsman called it "exceptionally funny," praising how it "strikes a deft balance between the blackest humour and pathos... a calling card for Ash’s glowing talent." The Telegraph praised her ability to "take the rawest subject matter and bring to it an unsentimental eye for a razor-sharp joke... keeping you on the edge of your seat," while The Guardian noted the show’s "oil-slick black humour." Chortle described it as "profoundly affecting," written and performed by "a smart, poetic, witty woman able to convert harrowing first-hand experiences into a show that's both heart-rending and funny." Distractify described it as "a beautiful fusion of tragedy and comedy... a genuinely brave performance."

The show was listed among the "Best Shows at the Fringe" by iNews and highlighted by Attitude as one of the festival’s LGBTQ+ acts to watch.

Ash performed the show in Los Angeles, New York, Glasgow, Berlin, and London, including a sold-out run at the Soho Theatre where BroadwayWorld described it as "challeng[ing] the line between storytelling and comedy, mak[ing] for a fascinating hour."

=== Television and film ===
Ash wrote for the first season of the Netflix animated series Haunted Hotel and is a writer on its newly announced second season.

Her web series 7P/10E inspired the CBS pilots My Time/Your Time and Real Life, produced by How I Met Your Mother creators Carter Bays and Craig Thomas, as reported by Variety and Deadline.

Ash also wrote, directed, and acted in Give Me an A, a female-directed anthology film created in response to the overturning of Roe v. Wade. The project premiered at Fantastic Fest in 2022 and later screened at the Overlook Film Festival in 2023.

Critics called Give Me an A “a battle cry and a warning of the future that works through complex emotions,” and “designed to challenge audiences... extremely effective... passionate, authentic, and important in a way that few anthologies are.” Reviewers highlighted Ash’s segment “God’s Plan” among the comedic standouts and described it as escalating to a “comedically absurd” scenario that delivers “movie justice.” Another review called the anthology “a wild ride … reacting to the overturning of Roe v Wade through horror, dark comedy, and sci-fi.”

=== Digital media ===
Ash co-hosts the horror-comedy podcast He’s Right Behind You and has appeared as a guest on Doughboys, Too Scary; Didn't Watch, Bananas, The Headgum Podcast, The Novelizers, Segments, Trust Me, Perfect Person, Dumb People Town, Just a Tip with Megan Batoon, Lady to Lady, and Lee Asher’s World.

She created and starred in the pandemic-era web series Passover.gay (originally titled Antisocial Distance), covered by Forbes and TVBrittanyF.

Ash also wrote and starred in a short-form web series, produced by Disney-owned Maker Studios and distributed in Australia via 9Now. She has also released viral sketches highlighted by Vulture.

=== Stand-up ===
Ash regularly performs stand-up in Los Angeles and at festivals.

== Personal life ==
Ash lives in Los Angeles, California, with her dog Phoebe and is married to comedian Amir Blumenfeld.
