= Cassandra Rawlins =

Fictional character from the American soap opera The Young and the Restless

- The Young and the Restless character
- Portrayed by: Nina Arvesen
- Duration: 1988–1991
- First appearance: March 3, 1988
- Last appearance: April 5, 1991
- Created by: William J. Bell
In-universe information
- Occupation: Owner Ra-Tech, the company
- Spouse: George Rawlins (1988); Adrian Hunter (1989–90); Brad Carlton (1991)
- Other relatives: Brittany Norman

Cassandra Rawlins is a fictional character from the American soap opera The Young and the Restless. She was portrayed by Nina Arvesen from March 3, 1988, to March 4, 1991. Hall was the character's maiden name.

== Casting ==
Kimberlin Brown, who would later be cast as Sheila Carter, auditioned for the role of Cassandra.

== Development ==
Doug Davidson, who portrayed Cassandra's love interest Paul Williams, revealed that Paul and Cassandra's love story was one of his favourites, explaining, "So much went into it" and William J. Bell had seen the "chemistry" between Arvesen and Davidson and "ran with it!" Davidson later revealed that Paul's storyline with Cassandra was one of two storylines that he was most often asked about by fans.

== Storylines ==
In the beginning, much of origin was a mystery. Paul Williams hired a woman by the name of Cassie as an interior designer for decorating his home and business office. Cassie got the opportunity to show Paul her creative flair for decorating and Paul would later become romantically involved with Cassie until when later he discovered she had a deep dark secret. Paul soon discovers Cassie real identity was Cassandra Hall Rawlins and she was married to George Rawlins the owner of Ra-Tech, a wealthy successful business owner.

George Rawlins discovered Paul was having an affair with his wife and had a massive heart attack. At the hospital George was informed he had a terminal illness and only had a few months to live. So George hired a hitman to kill him and frame Paul Williams for his murder. he faked his death with the help of his father. Carl Williams and Victor Newman suspected that Cassandra was The Black Widow Killer.

Paul's father, Police Detective Carl Williams was in charge of the murder investigation. Victor suspected that Cassandra was a lethal black widow, he successfully seduced her, and for a while, Cassandra tried to string along both Victor and Paul. Paul was arrested for the murder of George Rawlins, but when Paul got out of jail on bail, he and his father, decided to fake Paul's suicide in a plot to trap Cassandra.

Paul and Carl followed Cassandra to Bermuda where they discovered she had another lover, Adrian Hunter. They tormented Cassandra with visions of Paul as a ghost. Horrified and ridden with guilt, Cassandra returned to Genoa City. Soon after, Cassandra confessed that on the night that George was murdered, she was knocked unconscious, and when she awoke, there was a gun in her hand, and her husband was dead. Adrian, who was George's actual killer (hired by George), was angry that he had not been paid his fee. He followed Cassandra back to the states and devised a plan to get all of the money in George's estate.

Claiming to love her and convincing her that he would protect her if she were to be convicted of her husband's murder, Adrian manipulated Cassandra to sign over the rights to her estate and then devised a plan to kill her, making it appear as a suicide. He drugged her, tied her to a chair, and rigged a gun with melting ice to fire at her at a designated time. He then left the premises to create his alibi in another location. The gun fired, and Cassandra was killed... or so we thought. It turned out that Paul and Victor discovered Adrian's plot and saved Cassandra before the gun fired. Then they staged the scene to make it appear as if Adrian's plan was successful and were able to record a confession. Then Cassandra "rose from the dead" and Adrian was arrested for all of his crimes.

Paul and Cassandra mutually decided that they had been through too much to make their relationship work. Cassandra set her sights on Brad Carlton, but he only had eyes for Ashley Abbott who had just turned down his marriage proposal. So Cassandra offered Brad a job at Ra-Tech, the company she inherited from George. Brad accepted Cassandra's offer, and agreed to go skiing with her in Aspen to work out the details. On the way, Cassandra slipped him a drug and detoured to Las Vegas, where a groggy Brad married Cassandra in a quickie ceremony. When Brad finally regained consciousness he found himself in bed with his new wife Cassandra at a resort in Aspen, where they were stranded in a snowstorm. Brad was livid. He was missing a pressing appointment with Traci Abbott to discuss their remarriage. When Brad and Cassandra returned home, Traci was heartbroken to learn of her ex-husband's marriage to Cassandra. Brad eventually convinced Traci that he didn't love Cassandra.

With Traci's help, Brad got out of this marriage. At the divorce hearing, Brad and Cassandra agreed to part amicably without laying claim to each other's financial interests. Immediately after the hearing, Cassandra called Paul Williams, telling him that he was the man she really loved, and rushed off to see him. Before they could connect, however, Cassandra was struck by a truck and died at the scene.

At the reading of Cassandra's will, Paul was surprised to learn she had made him her sole heir however, before Paul could celebrate becoming a multi-millionaire, he found out that the judge who presided over Brad and Cassandra's divorce had died before he signing their divorce decree meaning that Brad and Cassandra were still married, and Brad was the legal heir to Cassandra's fortune, including the mansion and Ra-Tech. Brad accepted it all with no regard for Paul.

== Reception ==
A writer from Bernews called Cassandra "one of the most captivating and intriguing femme fatales in the history of daytime television".
