= Give Me an A =

Anthology Film

- Directed by: Hannah Alline; Avital Ash; Bonnie Discepolo; Loren Escandon; Valerie Finkel; Natasha Halevi; Caitlin Josephine Hargraves; Danin Jacquay; Sarah Kopkin; Francesca Maldonado; Monica Moore Suriyage; Kelly Nygaard; Megan Rosati; Mary C. Russel; Megan Swertlow; Erica Mary Wright
- Production companies: Fractal Clouds Productions; Give Me an A Film
- Distributed by: XYZ Films
- Release date: September 29, 2022
- Running time: 100 minutes
- Language: English

Give Me an A is a 2022 anthology feature film in response to the overturning of Roe v. Wade. releases by XYZ Films. The film uses 16 short film segments and a wraparound film to weave together each filmmaker's specific response to the Supreme Court decision. The film was created to be a fast reaction and was conceived of and completed in three months, an unusually fast timeline for a feature film.

The film won the Gold Audience Choice Award from Brooklyn Horror Film Festival less than two weeks after the film was completed.

The film's cast includes Alyssa Milano, Virginia Madsen, Gina Torres, Milana Vayntrub, Jennifer Holland, Sean Gunn, Molly C. Quinn, Jason George, and Jackie Tohn.

The film was created and produced by Natasha Halevi. The producing team also includes Giselle Gilbert, Jordan Crucchiola, Jonna Jackson, Jessica Taylor Galmor, Alyssa Matusiak and Stephanie Williams.

== Segments ==
Title	Director	Writer	Ref
Abigail	Natasha Halevi	Natasha Halevi	
Crone	Mary C Russell	Mary C. Russel	
Crucible Island	Valerie Finkle	Danielle Aufiero & Laura Covelli	
DTF	Bonnie Discepolo	Bonnie Discepolo & Trevor Munson	
God's Plan	Avital Ash	Avital Ash	
Good Girl	Danin Jacquay	Danin Jacquay & Matthew Vorce	
Hold Please	Hannah Alline	Hannah Alline	
Medi-Evil	Monica Moore-Suriyage	Rowan Fitzgibbon & Lexx Fusco	
Our Precious Babies	Erica Mary Wright	Annie Bond	
Plan C	Megan Rosati	Megan Rosati	
Sweetie	Caitlin Hargraves	Madison Hatfield	
The Walk	Sarah Kopkin	Sarah Kopkin	
The Last Stong	Loren Escandón	Loren Escandón	
The Voiceless	Meg Swertlow	Meg Swertlow	
Traditional	Francesca Maldonado	Lexx Fusco	
Vasectopia	Kelly Nygaard	Natasha Halevi	
Wraparound - The Cheerleaders	Natasha Halevi	Natasha Halevi	

== Awards and nominations ==
Year	Award	Category	Nominee	Result	Notes
2022	FilmQuest Festival Award	The Minerva Award	Natasha Halevi	Won	
2022	FilmQuest Festival Award	Best Supporting Actress - Feature	Gina Torres	Nominated	
2022	FilmQuest Festival Award	Best Supporting Actress - Feature	Molly C. Quinn	Nominated	
2022	FilmQuest Festival Award	Best Supporting Actor - Feature	Sean Gunn	Nominated	
2022	FilmQuest Festival Award	Best Ensemble Cast - Feature	All Segment Actors	Nominated	
2022	FilmQuest Festival Award	Overall Cinematic Achievement	All Segment Directors	Won	
2022	FilmQuest Festival Award	Best Editing	Stephanie Williams	Nominated	
2022	FilmQuest Festival Award	Best Costumes - Feature	Give Me an A	Nominated	
2022	FilmQuest Festival Award	Best Feature Film	Give Me an A	Nominated	
2022	Other Worlds Austin SciFi Film Festival	Best Feature Film	Give Me an A	Won	
2022	Brooklyn Horror Film Festival	Gold Audience Award	Give Me an A	Won	
2023	Renegade Film Festival	Best Writing	Give Me an A	Won	
2023	Renegade Film Festival	Best Feature Film	Give Me an A	Won	
