= Jeffrey Asch =

American actor

- Other name: Jeff Asch
- Occupation: Television actor

Jeffrey Asch, also credited as Jeff Asch, is an American television actor, known for his role as Maxwell Nerdstrom in the sitcom television series Saved by the Bell. He also made minor appearances in other sitcoms, such as Third Rock from the Sun, Friends, Step by Step, Scrubs, and Family Matters. His first screen credit was in Beach Fever, playing Ernie, in 1987. He also played a pizza delivery man in 1999 family film Little Heroes.

== Filmography ==
=== Film ===
Year	Title	Role	Notes
1987	Beach Fever	Ernie	
1991	Adventures in Dinosaur City	Bigfoot	
1996	Snitch	Jerry	
1999	Little Heroes	Pizza Man	

=== Television ===
Year	Title	Role	Notes
1990-1992	Saved by the Bell	Maxwell Nerdstrom	2 episodes
1996	Family Matters	Loomis	1 episode
1997	Step By Step	Doug Steckler	1 episode
1998	The Magnificent Seven	Jock Steele	1 episode
1998	The Drew Carey Show	Theodore	1 episode
2000	Providence	Marty	1 episode
2001	Friends	Writer	1 episode
2001	3rd Rock from the Sun	Client #1	1 episode
2002	The Agency	Hobby Shop Clerk	1 episode
2002	Scrubs	Dr. Amato	1 episode
2004	Charmed	Wimpy Guy	1 episode
