= Jan Arvesen =

Norwegian diplomat

Jan Arvesen (3 March 1931 – 20 July 2000) was a Norwegian diplomat.

He was born in Ås, and took the cand.jur. degree in 1958. He started working for the Norwegian Ministry of Foreign Affairs in 1959. He was an attaché at the United Nations delegation, served in the Ministry of Foreign Affairs for some time, served in Brazil, and then at the United Nations delegation again from 1969 to 1975. He was a sub-director in the Ministry of Foreign Affairs from 1975, then deputy under-secretary of state from 1976 to 1979. He was the Norwegian ambassador to Mexico from 1979 to 1985 and Costa Rica from 1985 to 1991. After a period as adviser on polar affairs in the Ministry of Foreign Affairs from 1991 to 1995, he was then ambassador to Portugal from 1996 to 1999. He died in July 2000.

Jan Arvesen is the father of actress Nina Arvesen (born 1961) who starred in the soap opera Young and the Restless as Cassandra Hall in the 80's.
