= Haunted Hotel =

American adult animated sitcom

- Promotional poster
- Genre: Animated sitcom; Supernatural; Comedy horror
- Created by: Matt Roller
- Voices of: Will Forte; Eliza Coupe; Skyler Gisondo; Natalie Palamides; Jimmi Simpson
- Music by: Ryan Elder & Joshua Moshier
- Country of origin: United States
- Original language: English
- No. of seasons: 2
- No. of episodes: 18

Production
- Executive producers: Matt Roller; Chris McKenna; Dan Harmon; Steve Levy; Chris Prynoski; Shannon Prynoski; Antonio Canobbio; Ben Kalina
- Producers: Nate Funaro; Angela Belyea
- Editor: Benjamin Morse
- Running time: 24–25 minutes
- Production companies: Magic Giraffe; Harmonious Claptrap; Americano Brutto; Titmouse, Inc.; Netflix Animation Studios

Original release
- Network: Netflix
- Release: September 19, 2025 – present

Haunted Hotel is an American adult animated supernatural sitcom created by Matt Roller that premiered on September 19, 2025. It is produced by Netflix Animation Studios. The series follows a woman and her two kids who struggle to run a haunted hotel, but soon gets help from her estranged brother who happens to be a ghost. The voice cast features Will Forte, Eliza Coupe, Skyler Gisondo, Natalie Palamides, and Jimmi Simpson. In September 2025, the series was renewed for a second season which premiered on October 9, 2026. In October 2026, the series was renewed for a third season.

== Synopsis ==
Katherine Freeling, along with her children Ben and Esther, move into the Undervale Hotel in Upstate New York, which was owned by her deceased brother Nathan. However, it is soon revealed that the place is haunted by the quirky restless spirits of the previous residents, including Nathan, who offers to help Katherine make the hotel's business successful. They meet an immortal demon accompanying Nathan named Abaddon, who is trapped in the body of a young boy from the 1700s and occasionally offers to help the family fend off evil demons, murderers and other entities who come to the Undervale for something in return.

== Voice cast ==
=== Main ===
- Will Forte as Nathan Freeling, Katherine's older brother who is a ghost, having died almost a year prior under circumstances he doesn't remember (it is later revealed that he died by suicide). He is a friendly and optimistic, albeit irresponsible person who tries to help out his sister around the hotel, whether it's trying to get guests to stay, how to end curses, or fighting off evil spirits.
- Eliza Coupe as Katherine Freeling, a recent divorcée and the reluctant new owner of the haunted Undervale Hotel in upstate New York and Nathan's younger sister. Business-minded and sensible, her attempts to keep everything running as smoothly as possible often come to a clash with the supernatural elements of the hotel and her family's various quirks, and forgets to make time for herself. She is still dealing with lingering grief and complicated emotions regarding Nathan and the circumstances of his death, refusing to discuss it with him.
- Skyler Gisondo as Ben Freeling, Katherine's young teen son and Nathan's nephew, who is socially awkward and tries to maintain some normality with his new life at the Undervale. He tries to be responsible and helpful, but is easily distracted by his creative passions or teenage growing pains. He is revealed to be a conduit for ghosts, much to both his intrigue and horror.
- Natalie Palamides as Esther Freeling, Katherine's precocious and mischievous preteen daughter and Nathan's niece, who enjoys using black magic and her new life at the Undervale. She struggles to make friends due to her eccentric behavior, and often butts heads with her mother and brother, but is fiercely loyal to her family. It is also revealed she has made several failed attempts to contact her estranged father, Katherine's ex-husband, and has since found a father figure in her uncle Nathan.
- Jimmi Simpson as Abaddon, an ancient demon who is trapped in the body of a young boy from the 1700s. Egotistical and vindictive, he proves himself to be just as immature and childish as the vessel he inhabits. He fails to understand most modern-day technology or societal expectations, putting him at odds with Katherine's attempts to run the hotel. Despite his selfish, demonic nature, he ultimately has a soft spot for the Freeling family, especially a close bond with Esther, and will help them when circumstances become dire. He enjoys crawling through the hotel's vents for means of travel and frequently sleeps under the kitchen sink. He reveals that he is classified as a demi-demon, which is a third-level demon, with partial lava powers and partial immortality.

=== Recurring ===
- Sunita Mani as Heather, a studious young Indian-American girl who is a classmate and friend to Esther. She shows surprising calmness towards all the supernatural events she walks in on.
- Riki Lindhome as Annabelle Anastasio, an emotionally volatile teenage ghost who died in the 1930s. She resembles a flapper girl and is the girlfriend of Ben. She often is dramatic, and laments having died in clothes she hated.
- Duncan Trussell as Stabby Paul, a deranged serial killer ghost who enjoys stabbing people with a kitchen knife despite not being able to physically harm them with it. He is part of a band with other ghosts in the hotel, declaring that music was his passion, and stabbing was merely a hobby.
- Maria Bamford as Angela, a pale ghost woman from the Victorian era who was killed after breaking her neck from falling off an apple tree on the hotel grounds.
- Matt Roller as Candle Head, a ghost obsessed with candles, and whose body is covered in candle wax.
- Diedrich Bader as Sheriff, the ghost of a sheriff who was shot dead on the hotel property.
- Gaten Matarazzo as Randy, the ghost of a teenager who died in the 1980s after twisting his neck while fleeing from the Pillowcase Killer.
- Randall Park as Joel, the owner of a Midwich copy store who Katherine went on a date with.
- Natalie Morales as Shayna (season 2), a new employee who is hired in the second season. In the first season, she was seen living and roaming the hotel’s attic. She claims her grandfather instructed her that someone from their bloodline must always stay inside the hotel.

=== Guest ===
==== Season 1 ====
- Keith David as Mortoth
- Jenifer Lewis as Jezmeralda
- Paul F. Tompkins as Tony
- Bobby Moynihan as Jeremy
- Eugene Cordero as Charlie
- Melissa Fumero as Enchanted Book
- Jim Rash as Patrick Pumpkin
- Beth Grant as Aunt Rose
- Kumail Nanjiani as Cult Leader Todd

==== Season 2 ====
- Frances Conroy as Catherine Witherkay, a new employee at the hotel.
- Kerri Kenney-Silver as Witch Courtney Vandenberg, a witch who curses the Freelings after Esther steals some of her herbs.
- Patti Harrison as Rebecca, the witch's assistant.
- Kate Micucci as the Cindys, twin ghosts who drowned near the Undervale.
- Debra Wilson as the mermaids which reside in the lake near the Undervale.
- Zooey Deschanel as Bridget, a ghost who resides at Midwich's lighthouse. During a night during full moon on a Friday 13th when ghosts are unbounded from the places where they died, she and Nathan spend the night together.
- Dan Stevens as Dr. Slashface, a headless ghost who challenges Nathan for the position of Ghost Mayor.
- Troy Baker as Dante Crowe, an occult detective (parodying John Constantine) who ghosts can touch.
- Michelle Gomez as Death.
- Justin Long as Ron, Katherine's ex-husband and Ben's and Esther's father.

== Episodes ==
=== Series overview ===
Season	Episodes	Originally released
1	10	September 19, 2025
2	8	October 9, 2026

=== Season 1 (2025) ===
No. overall	No. in season	Title	Directed by	Written by	Original release date
1	1	"Welcome to the Undervale"	Erica Hayes; Christopher Nance	Matt Roller	September 19, 2025
The ghosts at the Undervale Hotel are scaring away potential guests, much to Katherine's frustration. After failing to convince the ghosts to stay away from the guest rooms, she enlists the aid of an exorcist to remove them permanently. Esther is looking for the necklace of a ghost named Annabelle, who died in the 1930s, and whose remains are hidden somewhere in the hotel. She convinces Ben to hook up with Annabelle in the hope that she will reveal the location to him. Ben meets Annabelle and immediately forms a soul bond with her upon touching her hand; the reason for this is that he is a conduit to the netherworld. The exorcist Jezmeralda arrives at the hotel, who immediately starts banishing the ghosts to the netherworld, including Nathan, explaining that the hotel is actually a portal to hell. It is revealed that her true motive for banishing the ghosts was to summon the demon Mortoth from hell and unleash him onto the earth. Mortoth immediately turns on Jezmeralda and attacks her. Before he kills her, she tells Katherine that they can stop him by opening a conduit to the netherworld to bring back the ghosts. Since Ben is a conduit, Esther places a bone necklace from her stash of occult items onto Ben, opening the connection to the netherworld. Nathan and the other ghosts return after Katherine promises them free rein of the hotel, and they defeat Mortoth and send him back to hell.
2	2	"Unfinished Business"	Christopher Nance	Matt Roller	September 19, 2025
Katherine becomes concerned when Esther spends time with Phoebe, a ghost that she deems a bad influence. After Esther is initiated into Phoebe's 'gang' of delinquent ghosts, she resolves to rid the hotel of the ghost by completing her unfinished business- the only way to permanently send a ghost to the afterlife. When Esther discovers her mother in the middle of fulfilling Phoebe's desires, she angrily accuses her mother of stopping her from having friends. Guilty, Katherine tries to make peace with Phoebe, who lures her onto the roof of the hotel in revenge. Before Katherine can fall, Esther saves her, then proceeds to expel Phoebe to the afterlife by returning a stolen shawl to her. Katherine and Esther reconcile, and Esther agrees to give friendship with her school peers another chance. In a subplot, Nathan, Ben, and Abaddon are tasked with restoring electricity to the hotel, the source being an old haunted mill deep in the woods.
3	3	"Randy Slasher"	Christopher Nance	Avital Ash	September 19, 2025
In an attempt to impress his peers, Ben invites several classmates from school for a party at the hotel. Unfortunately, it is the same night that, annually, the mysterious Pillowcase Killer stalks the grounds in search of horny couples to kill. When he is spotted, Nathan tries his best to dissuade the serial killer from harming the teens, but cannot physically stop him. Ben helps his classmates flee with the help of Esther and Randy, the ghost of a teenage boy who died encountering the killer (ironically, the killer had stopped chasing him when Randy confessed to being a virgin, and then he proceeded to fall and fatally break his neck). Meanwhile, Katherine anxiously goes on a blind date, expecting it to go badly, but finds herself having a good time with her date, Joel. They return to the hotel together to have sex, immediately becoming the Pillowcase Killer's next targets. In the chaos to rescue the couple from the killer, Esther bursts in on her mother having sex, and is horrified. Seeing his own childhood trauma in Esther, the Pillowcase Killer relinquishes his weapon to her and leaves in the woods. Esther tells Katherine she is forever traumatized, but acquiesces to a bedtime story.
4	4	"How to Train Your Demon"	Bob Suarez	Sam Nulman	September 19, 2025
After Abaddon wrecks the hotel lobby, Katherine forces him to go to town with her. In town, Katherine encounters highly successful bed and breakfast owner Charlie, who is oblivious to Katherine's dislike of him and sends a guest her way as there are no vacancies in his B&B. Abaddon causes havoc on a playground. Back at the hotel, Abaddon tells Katherine about how he become trapped on earth and how he used to be a gatekeeper in hell. Hoping to redirect Abaddon's urges, Katherine assigns him a new role as doorman, telling him to stop any enemy of the hotel who tries to enter. Abaddon does by kidnapping Charlie when comes to the door, resulting in the furious Katherine chaining him up in the attic. After a guest arrives and is panicked by seeing Charlie tied up, Abaddon escapes and apologizes, though the guest still leaves with Charlie. In the B-plot, after discovering a brutally mutilated deer on the Undervale's porch, Esther comes to believe hotel guest Jeremy is a werewolf, citing howling from his room and fur on his clothes. After he tells Ben he hopes to transform, Esther, Ben, and Nathan are convinced and attack him. However, it turns out he is actually a husky breeder who is upset that his wife kicked him out, with him 'wanting to transform' meaning he wanted to stop breeding huskies for the sake of his marriage. The episode ends with another deer being snatched by mothman, revealing it was the true culprit.
5	5	"Rollyfluffs"	Bob Suarez	Carrie Rosen	September 19, 2025
Esther finds a strange furry creature in the hotel's glade. Capturing it in a jar, she dubs it a "Rollyfluff," and discovers that it loves oranges. However, it hates the sound of harmonicas and attacks Ben when he plays one. In a plot to become popular, Esther gathers more Rollyfluffs and hands them out to kids in school. That night, Esther's Rollyfluff escapes its jar and attacks her before she is rescued by Ben. The following day, the kids at school act strangely with orange-stained fingernails, and Esther discovers that the Rollyfluffs are forcing themselves down kids' throats to possess them and use their bodies to create eggs. After Ben gets taken over, Esther and an unpossessed Heather realize the key to defeating the Rollyfluffs is Ben's harmonica and they run around the school playing the instrument, causing the eggs to explode and the Rollyfluffs exit the kids and flee. Meanwhile, Katherine repairs the hotel's honeymoon suite, which turns out to be sentient and falls in love with her. When Katherine tries to politely reject its advances, the suite turns on her and tries to trap her inside it. After she gets mad and insults the room it loses interest and demolishes itself. In another plot, Nathan struggles to teach Abaddon how to use a computer.
6	6	"Ghost Hunters!"	Meg Waldow	Greg Gallant	September 19, 2025
Katherine checks her email, and Nathan notices that she sent him a message after his death. Katherine refuses to open it and finds another email requesting the hotel be featured on the web series Ghost Hunters, where hosts Lonny and Gib explore haunted buildings. While initially hesitant, Katherine agrees after seeing the high amount of views on their videos. The Freelings hold auditions for ghosts to appear on the show; however, when Katherine inadvertently insults the ghosts, they hide from the camera while Katherine tries fruitlessly to show them to the hosts. Desperate to maintain the Ghost Hunters' interest, Katherine sends them into the Forbidden Wing, from which no human or ghost has ever returned. Nathan discovers that Katherine's email was actually of her ranting about things she disliked about him when he was alive and they start arguing, but stop after realizing the ghost hunters are in danger. Katherine and Nathan rush in to save them and are attacked by a giant spectral anglerfish that eats memories. They escape, but the ghost hunters are left amnesiac. Esther tells Lonny and Jib they are philanthropists and sends them off. Katherine writes Nathan a new letter about things she likes about him, while Esther shows a video she created about Abaddon, which is shown to be watched by a mysterious self-flagellating figure. In the B-plot, Ben finds a magical journal that responds to his writing. Ben forms a close connection with the book, and Annabelle accuses him of having an emotional affair. The book advises Ben to make it up to Annabelle and the two get back together. The spirit in the book tries to tell Ben to finish writing it in so that its curse is broken, but Ben puts it back on the shelf before it can do so.
7	7	"Seven Deadly Bens"	Christopher Nance	Siena East	September 19, 2025
After a repairman leaves his work on the Undervale's broken front door unfinished and Ben is too nervous to confront him, he wishes to be more confident in front of a wardrobe with a mirror. The wardrobe shakes and a clone, who calls himself Confident Ben, emerges. Katherine quickly realizes there are two Bens and tries to reunite them using the wardrobe; however, this instead creates more versions of Ben, each based on an aspect of his personality: Scared Ben, Cat Ben, Dad Ben, Free Spirit Ben, Horny Ben, and Magician Ben. The Ben clones successfully scare the repairman into finishing the job, earning them praise from Katherine while the original Ben feels left out. The clones then decide that the way to fuse back together is to eliminate the worst Ben, who they deem to be the original. The original Ben argues that the split may only stop when there is one Ben left, causing the clones break into an all-out fight, which stops when all of the Bens get injured when only one gets cut (suggesting that they would all die if one is killed). Katherine gives a speech about embracing all parts of Ben, and the Bens are able to reunite using the wardrobe, though the ending reveals that Free Spirit Ben was uninvolved in the fusion as he sets sail across the ocean. In the subplot, Nathan starts phasing through the ground, and he and Esther learn that ghosts lacking purpose will sink to the earth's core. Esther brings in Heather to help determine Nathan's purpose and they ask the hotel ghosts with no success. Nathan starts rapidly descending and nearly falls into the core until he mentions spaghetti night and suddenly stops falling. Nathan realizes his purpose is spaghetti night and rises back to earth.
8	8	"Aunt Rose"	Bob Suarez	Kevin Arrieta; Dan Guterman	September 19, 2025
In a cave just off hotel grounds, Esther reanimates a corpse by inserting an amulet into its chest. The next morning, Katherine announces that her and Nathan's Aunt Rose is coming to visit the hotel, much to the other Freelings' annoyance due to her cruel personality. Nathan gleefully realizes he doesn’t have to interact with Rose as he is dead while Esther brings Ben to the cave where she has chained up the zombie, whom she has called Dan. She reveals that her plan is to have him pose as her father for a meeting with the school's principal. Back at the hotel, after Rose insults Nathan to Katherine, he reveals himself and the existence of ghosts. Rose then tells Katherine she is terminally ill with days left, and that she now plans to die in the hotel and become a ghost. After successfully tricking the principal, Ben is concerned when Esther keeps Dan around despite having served his purpose. Ben frees Dan by cutting his chains, but things quickly go awry when Dan abducts Rose, with Katherine and Nathan hesitating to intervene as Rose is outside the hotel grounds. Esther confesses she has been using Dan as a substitute for her father, who never returns their calls. After a talk with Ben, she removes Dan's amulet and he disintegrates. Rose rises as a ghost, only to fulfill her purpose and move on almost instantly, with Nathan and Katherine concluding that her unfinished business was knowing they would be eternally miserable. In Abaddon's subplot, a doorstop causes him to get stuck behind a door with a spider he names Jarbon.
9	9	"The Esthercist"	Meg Waldow	Alix Bloom	September 19, 2025
Nathan prepares to celebrate the first anniversary of his death like a birthday, while Katherine avoids discussing it with him. Nathan cannot remember his death beyond Katherine having told him he died when he choked on a grape while watching Con Air. Esther accidentally breaks a magic snowglobe, summoning a group of demons, the Spawn of Rabisu. She leads everyone into the fortified parlor room, which is protected by salt circles, and attempts to figure out a plan. Ben attempts to contact the Vatican for help, but is repeatedly left on hold or transferred. Abaddon agrees to find ingredients for an anti-possession talisman before the demons can break in, but keeps returning with useless items. Katherine accidentally breaks the salt ring during an argument with Nathan, allowing a demon to enter and possess Esther. The demon begins revealing the family's personal secrets to each other, causing more arguments between Nathan and Katherine, and eventually, they are forced to flee into a closet. Inside, Katherine finally reveals to Nathan the tragic truth behind his death: he committed suicide. Shattered, Nathan admonishes Katherine for suggesting his not knowing didn't matter, but before they can resolve the issue, the demon destroys Abaddon’s failed talisman and possesses the whole family, sans Nathan and Abaddon. The demon proceeds to walk the family to the lake to drown them, while Nathan follows, spilling his own secrets to the family, and telling Katherine he loves her and won't leave her again. Abaddon manages to fix the snowglobe before the family can drown, banishing the demons back to hell and freeing them from possession. Katherine and Nathan reconcile, with Katherine lamenting that she wished Nathan had called her before he died. The two agree that they have a lot to talk through with each other.
10	10	"The Acolytes of Abaddon"	Meg Waldow	Joshua Corey; Brian Kratz	September 19, 2025
One morning, Esther and Abaddon find a mysterious tablet that has the ability to send people or objects back to the dawn of time. Suddenly, dozens of robed figures arrive at the hotel and stand menacingly in the yard. Katherine goes out to confront them, when their leader, Todd, appears and freely admits they are a cult devoted to Abaddon and have arrived at the hotel to return him to Hell. Despite Nathan's suspicions, he and Ben are quickly taken in by the cult, who are upfront about all of their intentions, although Katherine remains skeptical. Meanwhile, Esther is heartbroken over Abaddon’s intent to leave. The cult performs their ceremony to send Abaddon back to Hell, but reveals they are actually bringing Hell to Earth, causing an apocalypse that results in Katherine, Nathan, Ben, and Esther's deaths, but also restores Abaddon’s powers. Abaddon uses the tablet from earlier in the day to go back to the dawn of time, living through all of Earth's history until he catches up to the present day and tries to stop the apocalypse by murdering Todd. When this fails, he goes through a trial-and-error process, going through Earth's history hundreds of times, trying to stop the apocalypse, whilst also preserving his powers. Realizing there is no way to have both and choosing friendship over power, Abaddon scares the cult away when they first arrive by attacking them with a shovel, which finally succeeds. He then accepts his place on Earth and joins Esther in pranking Ben.

=== Season 2 (2026) ===
No. overall	No. in season	Title	Directed by	Written by	Original release date
11	1	"Ooze"	Meg Waldow	Greg Gallant	October 9, 2026
After the Freelings have 99 successful bookings (their hundredth being killed by supernatural balloons), Katherine decides to hire a new employee. At breakfast, Shayna, who the Freelings believed was a ghost, is revealed to be alive, having been living at the Undervale for the past two years at the bequest of her grandfather. After rejecting several creepy applicants, Katherine hires Catherine Witherkay, an experienced hotelier, but endeavours to keep the hotel's haunted nature secret. At first sight, Abbadon falls in love with her. After Shayna's eviction, purple ooze starts emerging out of the vents, walls and floor, possessing anyone who comes into skin contact with, including Catherine and several accountancy convention attendees, and compelling them to dig. Consulting Shayna (despite Esther's objections), she tells Esther and Ben that someone from her bloodline has stayed at the hotel to prevent an eldritch god who she believes is called "Pete" from awakening. After Esther defeats "Pete" by carving a sigil into its eye, Katherine lets Catherine go and hires Shayna instead.
12	2	"Dinner Party"	Christopher Nance	Carrie Rosen	October 9, 2026
Ben hosts a 1930s-themed dinner for Annabelle (where none of the living guests are allowed to eat) to announce a huge commitment. Fearing that he will propose to her, Katherine spends the evening casting aspersions on relationships despite Joel having been invited as a guest. After Ben announces that he bought a pet tortoise for him and Annabelle to look after, Annabelle reveals that she hoped that he would poison himself so that they could be together.
13	3	"The Witch"	Bob Suarez	Siena East	October 9, 2026
After Esther stole herbs from the garden of a local witch, Courtney Vandenburg, the witch curses Esther, Katherine and Ben by forcing them to drink soup. Triggering Ben's nut allergy, the Freelings and the witch go to the hospital in Midwich, where Ben is easily treated and the witch is put under observation due to prior lack of medical attention. Back at the Undervale, Abaddon along with the ghost of a boy endeavour to make macaroni and cheese.
14	4	"Ghost Day Out"	Meg Waldow	Matt Roller	October 9, 2026
On the night of a full moon on a Friday 13th (an event that happens about once every twenty years), the ghosts of the Undervale and Midwich celebrate being unbounded from the place where they died during a night of freedom. While a sleep-deprived Esther tries to help Nathan fulfill his wish list, he meets Bridget, a ghost who died at Midwich's light house, and spends most of the night with her, albeit fearing what will happen once the night is over; Randy accompanies Ben to a school dance to try and help him become more popular; and Katherine spends the night mothering Abaddon after his demon traits disappear in the ghosts' absence.
15	5	"Astral Esther"	Christopher Nance	Avital Ash	October 9, 2026
Esther decides to astral project herself to get around Katherine's security measures. However, after performing the spell despite not reading it completely, she has been outside her body for six days due to it not being where she left it, hoping to keep it from Katherine to keep out of trouble. However, after Katherine finds out and involves herself and Shayna to find Esther's body, they learn that Esther's soul will dissipate after seven days. Meanwhile, after Abaddon burns Ben's clothes and eats his pet fish, Nathan decides to take them out into the middle of the lake for a bonding exercise. However, they are attacked by the lake's mermaids; while trapped on a small island, Abaddon confides in Ben that he torments him because of his innocence, later saving him from the mermaids' siren call.
16	6	"Dante Crowe"	Bob Suarez	Joshua Corey & Brian Kratz	October 9, 2026
17	7	"The Concierge"	Meg Waldow	Miles Woods	October 9, 2026
Struggling to keep on top of the upkeep of the Undervale, Katherine learns from the ghost of a previous owner about 'The Concierge', an entity that manifests itself as multiple arms which emerge from the back of whoever rings the bell that summons it. Meanwhile, Nathan runs for the position of Ghost Mayor (to fulfill his dreams of serving in elected office and to wear the ghost hat that comes with the office), which Katherine supports in a bid to ensure compliance from the Undervale's ghosts. However, Nathan faces a challenge from Dr. Slashface, a headless 'outside' ghost running on a promise of banishing the living from the hotel, albeit with the ulterior motive of taking over much of the hotel for himself. Disapproving of Esther's negative campaigning including an attack ad against Slashface on the hotel's own channel, Nathan calls for a more honest election, resulting in a drop in support for him after he is called out for lying. After Esther announces her last-minute candidacy, the ghosts adopt anarchy after Nathan suggests that the ghosts do not have to mirror the practices of the living (albeit to suggest a council as an alternative to a mayor).
18	8	"The Visit"	Christopher Nance	Sam Nulman	October 9, 2026
The episode features flashbacks to when Katherine, Ben and Esther visited the Undervale shortly after Nathan acquired it as the Freelings try to remember what to do to free the Undervale from a demonic forest. Under the guise of visiting Nathan and helping him renovate some rooms, Katherine revealed to Nathan that she was taking a break from her husband Ron due to his bad business decisions.

== Production ==
Haunted Hotel is created by Matt Roller. Roller executive produces the series alongside Chris McKenna, Dan Harmon, Steve Levy, Chris Prynoski, Shannon Prynoski, Antonio Canobbio, and Ben Kalina. The main voice cast includes Will Forte, Eliza Coupe, Skyler Gisondo, Natalie Palamides, and Jimmi Simpson. On September 26, 2025, Netflix renewed the series for a second season. On October 30, 2026, Netflix announced that the series would be renewed for a third season.

== Release ==
The series premiered on Netflix on September 19, 2025. The second season premiered on October 9, 2026.

== Reception ==
On Rotten Tomatoes, the series holds an approval rating of 89% based on 19 reviews, with an average of rated reviews of 7.9/10. The website's critics consensus reads, "Featuring a wonderful voice cast and all the spooky trappings of greater series, Haunted Hotel is a welcoming and familiar horror-comedy for all to enjoy." Metacritic, which uses a weighted average, gave a score of 58 out of 100 based on 6 critics, indicating "mixed or average".
