= Keith Elliot Greenberg =

American author (born 1959)

- Born: May 5, 1959 (age 67); New York City, New York, U.S.
- Education: Queens College, City University of New York
- Occupations: Author, television producer
- Children: 2 including Dylan Greenberg

Keith Elliot Greenberg (born May 5, 1959) is a New York Times bestselling author and television producer.

== Education ==
Greenberg attended Bayside High School in Queens, New York, graduating in January 1977. Before graduating from Queens College majoring in communications and journalism, he wrote pro wrestling stories professionally at age 19.

== Career ==
His first book, Menudo, was published in 1983 and was the story of Menudo, a 1980s pop band. In the mid-1980s, he began working for USA Today, and other news publishers.

After writing about professional wrestling for a number of newspapers and magazines, he became a writer, contributor, and reporter for WWE, known formerly as World Wrestling Federation, in 1985. He also co-authored a number of biographies of professional wrestlers, including Freddie Blassie, Ric Flair, and Superstar Billy Graham.

In 1990, he wrote the PBS documentary The Blue Helmets, about United Nations peace-keeping.

In December 2010, St. Martin's Press released Love Hurts, the story of the Caffey family murder in rural Texas and Greenberg's second true-crime book for the publisher. His first was Perfect Beauty, about a murder in Ohio.

His books include New York Times best seller To Be the Man (coauthored with Ric Flair), as well as Erik is Homeless, and Zack's Story. In November 2010, Backbeat Books released December 8, 1980: The Day John Lennon Died, Greenberg's minute-by-minute account of the last day of John Lennon's life.

In 2015, Too Fast To Live, Too Young To Die, about the death of James Dean and the cult that surrounds it was published by Hal Leonard/Applause Books. Scheduled for release that year was an autobiography of former WWE Champion, The Iron Sheik to be published by ECW Press; however, its publication was cancelled. Pro Wrestling Stories opined that the book was the greatest unpublished treasure in wrestling journalism.

In 2017, his third St. Martins true-crime book, Killing for You about a crime in Orange County, California, was released.

In January, 2018, the Toronto Star listed Best Seat in the House: My Life in the Jeff Healey Band, co-authored by Greenberg and former Jeff Healey Band drummer Tom Stephen, as one of its top five music book recommendations. The Globe and Mail described the book as "240 beer-soaked...and debauched pages."

His 2019 book, Where You Goin' With That Gun in Your Hand? The True Crime Blotter of Rock 'n' Roll, published by Backbeat, profiles 21 deaths related to the music industry.

His book, Too Sweet: Inside the Indie Wrestling Revolution, was released in 2020 by ECW Press.

While writing the "Colour Commentary" column in the publication, Inside the Ropes Wrestling Magazine in 2021, he began writing his next book for ECW Press, Follow the Buzzards: Pro Wrestling in the Age of COVID-19.

He has written for WWE magazine, Playboy, Men's Journal, HuffPost, Maxim and The Village Voice. He previously was a producer for Geraldo at Large, a prime-time television program on Fox News, as well as for America's Most Wanted, Dateline NBC and Forensic Files.

ECW Press also published his book: Bigger, Better, Badder: WrestleMania III and the Year It All Changed in March 2025. In November 2025, Random House released his book chronicling the first five years of All Elite Wrestling (AEW), titled This Book is All Elite.

He regularly appears on A&E's WWE Biography series, where he is listed as "WWE historian."

== Personal life ==
He has two children and lives in Brooklyn, New York. Keith's oldest child is underground New York filmmaker Dylan Greenberg.
