= DinoCity =

1992 video game

- North American cover art
- Developer: Irem
- Publisher: Irem
- Platform: Super NES
- Release: JP: July 17, 1992; NA: September 1992; EU: 1992
- Genres: Action, platform
- Modes: Single-player, multiplayer

DinoCity (Note: Known in Japan as Dinowars Kyōryū Ōkoku e no Daibōken (Japanese: ダイナウォーズ 恐竜王国への大冒険; lit. Dinowars: Adventures in the Dinosaur Kingdom)) is a 1992 platform video game developed and published by Irem Corporation for the Super Nintendo Entertainment System.

The game is loosely based on the 1991 made-for-television film Adventures in Dinosaur City, and borrows many of the film's characters, settings, and basic plot while providing its own unique art direction and style. Initially released in July 1992 in Japan, the game was later made available in North America the following September. The game centers on two friends, Timmy and Jamie, young children who are accidentally transported to a world resembling prehistoric Earth populated by anthropomorphic dinosaurs. While a device which will allow them to return home exists in this environment, a critical component has been stolen by Mr. Big, leader of a gang of Neanderthals known as The Rockeys, leaving the player to guide Timmy or Jamie to his castle to retrieve it. They are assisted by Rex, a Tyrannosaurus, and Tops, a Protoceratops, each with their own play-styles.

== Gameplay ==
A player controlling Tops and Jamie

DinoCity is a traditional platformer-style action game where the player must move their character from left to right across the screen while avoiding obstacles, jumping on platforms, and defeating enemies. Players are given the choice of controlling Rex with Timmy or Tops with Jamie at the beginning of the game as well as at the start of each new level. While Tops can throw darts to harm enemies from a distance, Rex is confined to close combat by punching them or swinging his tail. Each dinosaur character can defeat enemies by jumping on them, and at any point the player may relegate control to their human riders, who can freeze enemies in place by using a special energy device. While controlling the children, the dinosaurs become immobile and may be used as platforms to reach otherwise inaccessible items. The game supports up to two players who are given alternating turns each time the other loses a life.

In order to pass each of the game's six levels (and one secret level), players must navigate through a number of screens joined by doors. Each screen resembles a different environment, and can include caves, jungles, grasslands, ice caverns, volcanoes, or cities. Once a player has passed enough screens, they must battle a boss character before advancing. If a player loses enough lives, they are given the option to continue up to three times before the game is over. During gameplay, a player may collect eggs which grant an extra life if enough are obtained, as well as hearts that restore lost health. The game utilizes a password system that allows players to return to the start of any level from the title screen.

== Development ==
DinoCity was developed and published by Irem Corporation in 1992, and was led by project directors K. Okada and Y. Takashima. The game was based on the American film Adventures in Dinosaur City which has been released worldwide earlier that year, with the Japanese title Dinowars Kyōryū Ōkoku e no Daibōken being the same name as the Japanese version of the movie. While many of the game's characters including the heroes Rex, Tops, Timmy, Jamie and villains Mr. Big and The Rockeys were taken directly from the film, they were largely re-designed into a more anime-based style by staff artists using the pseudonyms "Munou no Hito" and "SDR 200". Much of the game's art direction utilizes a colorful, cartoon-like approach to environments and enemies as opposed to the darker presentation of the original film. The music for DinoCity was produced by Irem in-house composer Hiroshi Ebihara, who had previously collaborated on the score to Super R-Type. Although no official soundtrack was released, select tracks were made available for listening from in-game sound test menu accessible from the title screen.

The North American version was originally marketed by Irem America under the title "Dinosaurs" shortly after the game's Japanese release in July, with the finalization of the game's title coming just before its English release. Although the title was originally marked for an August release, it would later be pushed back to the following September. Beginning in early 1993, Irem America held a magazine promotion where players could receive an official DinoCity t-shirt featuring Rex by sending in two UPC labels from specified Irem games.

=== Version differences ===
While the majority of the game remains unchanged from one region release to another, a few graphic and gameplay changes exist between the English and original Japanese versions of the game. The cavewomen enemy character "Cindy" was originally designed as a large-busted woman whose character sprite was altered for the North American release due to Nintendo of America's policy against overly-sexual depictions of women on their consoles. The Japanese version also includes the option to select "Normal" or "Hard" difficulty settings at the beginning of the game. While the Hard setting represents the default play mode on the English version, the Normal setting grants the player five health points instead of three, as well as unlimited continues.

== Reception ==
Reception

Review scores
Publication	Score
AllGame	3/5
Computer and Video Games	83/100
Electronic Gaming Monthly	6/10, 8/10, 7/10, 7/10
Famitsu	6/10, 6/10, 5/10, 4/10
Super Play	83%
Total!	55%
Control	71%
Entertainment Weekly	B+
Mean Machines	78%
N-Force	81%
SNES Force	81%
Super Action	78%
Super Gamer	78%
Super Pro	86/100

DinoCity received mostly good to average reviews during its North American release. Electronic Gaming Monthly was impressed with the game's "colorful" graphics and "cute" character designs, stating that it "seems geared for kids, but adults can play too." However, the magazine ultimately declared that "although [the game] enjoys some of the nicest SNES wallpaper yet, the theme is less than exhilerating [sic] while the pace remains stuck in molasses ... the overall execution of this title was cooler than it should be." GamePro magazine similarly declared that "the colorful cartoon-style graphics create an ancient, humorous atmosphere ... thematically the game seems aimed at the younger set." Despite its target demographic, the magazine still found it to be challenging enough for "intermediate adventurers." Nintendo Power praised the game's "colorful and very detailed" graphics and "very good" music, but found the overall experience to be "a little too difficult for beginning players."

A more contemporary review of DinoCity from the website Allgame was largely in agreement with earlier editors, referring to it as "a (relatively) challenging and interesting game featuring a mind-boggling variety of levels." The game's vibrant graphics were once again touched upon, with the website calling them "not only adorable, [but] sophisticated as well. The backgrounds vary greatly from level to level and the characters are nicely animated and drawn in a cartoon-like manner. Also, the game is colorful to the extreme." IGN placed the game tenth on its "Top 10 Prehistoric Games" list in February 2007, stating that "If you never got a chance to play Dino City on the SNES, we feel bad for you."

Entertainment Weekly gave the game a B+ and wrote that "With a tail-wagging reptile straight out of Super Mario World, cavemen reminiscent of the Flintstones, and peril-laden scenery popularized by countless action games, most kids will find DinoCity instantly familiar. Whether or not they enjoy it will depend on their tolerance for cutesy-poo characters (in this case, a small boy and his dinosaur pal) and a pace more thoughtful than frenetic. DinoCity is the perfect introductory cartridge for post-kindergarteners, a brief way station of innocence before they discover the joys of video games' heavy armament." Super Gamer gave an overall score of 78% stating: "A platformer packed with slick graphics and plenty of gameplay but too easy."
