= Nina Arvesen =

American actress

- Nina Arvesen
- Born: Nina Elisabeth Arvesen; May 16, 1961 (age 65); White Plains, New York, United States
- Occupations: Film; television actor; model; dancer
- Height: 5 ft 10 in (1.78 m)
- Parent(s): Father Jan Arvesen; Mother Sidsel, pronounced "sis-sell Arvesen"
- Relatives: Jannik Arvesen (brother); Christian Arversen (brother)

Nina Arvesen (born May 16, 1961) is an American actress of Norwegian extraction, model, dancer, and businesswoman. Best known for her performances in American soap operas, Arvesen landed her two most prominent acting roles as Cassandra Rawlins on The Young and the Restless and as Angela Raymond on the NBC television series Santa Barbara.

== Early life ==
Arvesen was born in White Plains, New York to Norwegian parents. Her father, Jan Arvesen, was a Norwegian diplomat and was Norway's ambassador to Mexico (1979-1985), to Costa Rica (1985-1991) and to Portugal (1996-1998). Her mother, Sidsel (pronounced "sis-sell") was an actress in Norway. Arvensen has two brothers: Jannik Arvesen who is a financial investment adviser in Norway, and Christian Arversen who works in film and special effects in Los Angeles California.

Before working in the United States, Arvesen had her own talk show for three years in Norway and also worked as an actress in Egypt, Brazil, Costa Rica, Bermuda and Norway before moving back to the United States.

== Career ==
Arvesen initially began her career during her teens as an actress, model, dancer and a classically trained pianist in Norway. After college, she made the decision to leave Norway in 1986 to pursue her dream of an acting career in the United States where she has appeared in several television shows, commercials and movies. According to Arvesen, American casting directors refused to accept her overseas acting credits. She eventually got her first US screen credit and Screen Actors Guild membership card after appearing in the 1987 movie Dragnet with Dan Aykroyd and Tom Hanks. After she stopped working in the various soap operas that made her famous, her career aspirations shifted from acting to work modeling for television commercials, print ads and popular magazines. Arvesen went on to launch and create her own production company, The Arvesen Group.

Soap Opera Digest called Arvesen one of "TV's Most Beautiful Women" in their March 21, 1989 publication, which had over 1 million subscribers at the time.

Arvesen currently owns and operates her own dance studio in Santa Monica, California, after retiring from movies and television.

== Charity work ==
Besides being the Master of ceremonies of more than one St. Jude Children's Research Hospital's annual fund-raising events, Arvesen has been involved with the Make-A-Wish Foundation and the Juvenile Diabetes Research Foundation (JDRF).

== Filmography ==
Year	Film	Role	Notes
1987	Beach Fever		
1987	Santa Barbara	Celia Robbins (three episodes)	
1987	Dragnet		
1988–1991	The Young and the Restless	Cassandra Rawlins	
1988	Maniac Cop	Regina Sheperd	
1988	Who Gets the Friends?	Inga	
1989	Now You See It	Herself	
1991–1993	Santa Barbara	Angela Raymond	
