= Natasha Halevi =

American actress and director

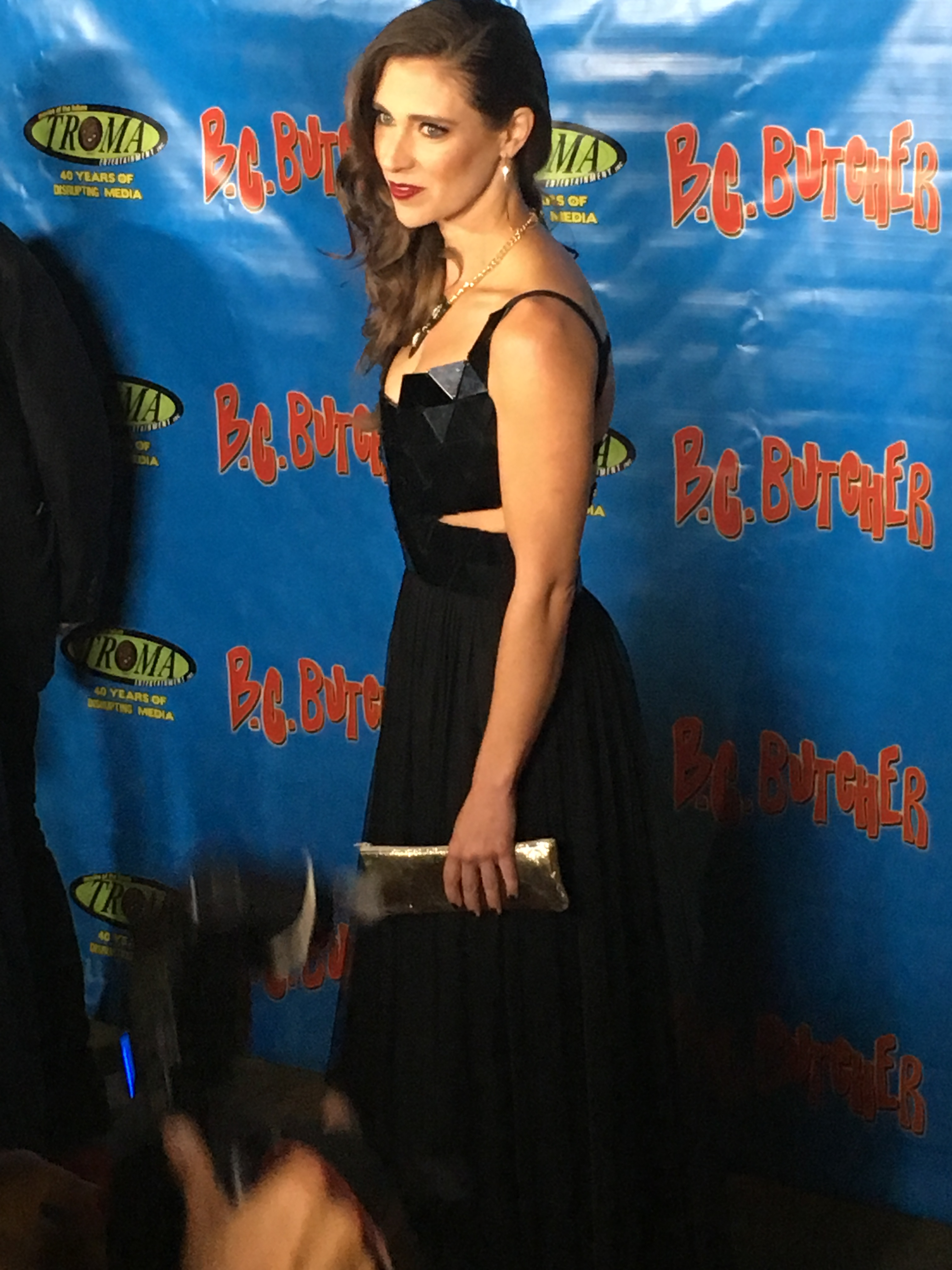
- Natasha Halevi on the red carpet for B.C. Butcher
- Born: January 12, 1982 (age 44); Ventura, California, U.S.
- Other name: Tasha Halevi
- Education: University of California, Davis (BS, BA)
- Occupations: Actress, director
- Years active: 2014–present
- Spouse: Sean Gunn (m. 2019)

Natasha Halevi (born January 12, 1982) is an American actress and filmmaker based in Los Angeles, California. She is known for creating and producing Give Me An A, a reproductive rights horror anthology, as well as directing the wraparound and a segment alongside 16 other female directors of the film. She is a founding director with Fatale Collective, creators of the horror anthology Fatale Collective: Bleed. Her directorial work has been released by XYZ Films, Crypt TV, Midnight Pulp and Screambox. She is known for her acting roles as Anaconda in Kansas Bowling's B.C. Butcher released by Troma, the role of Eliza Taylor's best friend in I'll Be Watching, Cara in Lunch Break Feminist Club, and Alexis Shine in They Want Dick Dickster.

== Early life and education ==
Halevi was born in Ventura, California, and attended St. Bonaventure High School. Halevi then studied at the University of California, Davis where she graduated with a Bachelor of Science degree in biology and a Bachelor of Arts in dramatic arts. While in college, she also guided for Outdoor Adventures as a rafting, sea kayaking and rock climbing guide.

== Career ==
=== Early career ===
Halevi's early career involved work in the outdoors, including guiding climbing, rafting, and kayaking, as well as being a ranger in Yosemite National Park. Halevi lived in Boulder, Colorado during her early 20s, where she worked in sustainable design, oversaw LEED Certification on over 20 buildings, and was awarded the Green Building Guild Leadership Initiative Award for her work and education in Integrated Design, which she implemented with building teams and also taught at Universities across California.

=== Acting ===
Halevi is known for her roles in horror and dark comedy. Most recently she can be seen in the desert indie horror The Buildout (2024) and tech horror I'll Be Watching (2023) as Eliza Taylor's best friend. She is also a member of the ensemble cast of Kansas Bowling's Cuddly Toys (2022).

In 2014, she received her first feature film role in the dark comedy They Want Dick Dickster starring Robert Ray Shafer, Tim Russ, Tim Abell, and Richard Grieco. In the same year, she received a starring role in B.C. Butcher, directed by Kansas Bowling. In 2015, she played supporting roles in the feature films Toby Goes to Camp and Cop-Aholic.

=== Directing ===
Halevi directed multiple segments of the reproductive rights horror anthology Give Me An A including the wraparound project called The Cheerleaders with cameo from Virginia Madsen and Abigail starring Alyssa Milano and Sean Gunn that puts letters of Abigail Adams and John Adams to film.

Halevi directed a segment of the anthology Fatale Collective: Bleed with Fatale Collective and is one of the original directors of the group of female horror directors. Fatale Collective members include Lola Blanc, Danin Jacquay, Francesca Maldonado, and Megan Rosati. Fatale Collective: Bleed premiered at FilmQuest in 2019 where it won the “Director’s Award for Cinematic Achievement”. The anthology also screened at Fantastic Fest, Overlook Film Festival and the Brooklyn Horror Film Festival.

Halevi is the director and part of the cast of Lunch Break Feminist Club which won "Best Ensemble Cast" at the Hollywood and Vine Film Festival on December 12, 2015.

In 2019, Halevi directed Beauty Juice starring Jennifer Holland, Tiffany Shepis and Krista Allen. This film won the Audience Choice Award at the Atlanta Horror Film Festival and went on to stream on Crypt TV, a prestigious horror distributor founded by Jack Davis and Eli Roth and backed by Jason Blum and Blumhouse Productions.

== Filmography ==
Film

Year	Title	Writer	Director	Actor	Producer	Role
2015	Lunch Break Feminist Club	Yes	Yes	Yes	Yes	Cara
2016	B.C. Butcher	No	No	Yes	No	Anaconda
2018	Dick Dickster	No	No	Yes	No	Alexis
2018	Swamp Women Kissing Booth	No	No	Yes	Yes	Buela
2018	Primitiva	No	No	No	Yes	
2019	Beauty Juice	Yes	Yes	No	Yes	
2019	Fatale Collective: Bleed	Yes	Yes	Yes	Yes	Mom (Voice)
2020	After Ray	Yes	Yes	Yes	No	Cole
2022	Cuddly Toys	No	No	Yes	No	Luella the Pageant Host
2024	The Buildout	No	No	Yes	No	Cleric Kanner
2025	Superman	No	No	Yes	No	Amanda Marie McCoy

== Personal life ==
She married actor Sean Gunn in 2019.
