= Adventures in Dinosaur City =

- Directed by: Brett Thompson
- Written by: Wili Baronet; Lisa Morton
- Produced by: Luigi Cingolani
- Starring: Omri Katz; Shawn Hoffman; Tiffanie Poston
- Cinematography: Rick Fichter
- Edited by: W. Peter Miller; Elizabeth Canney
- Music by: Fredric Teetsel
- Production company: Smart Egg Pictures
- Distributed by: Guild Home Video (United Kingdom direct-to-video release); Acteurs Auteurs Associés (AAA) (France theatrical release); The Disney Channel (United States TV premiere); Republic Pictures Home Video (United States home video release); Malofilm Video (Canadian home video release)
- Release dates: October 1991 (United Kingdom); February 1992 (France); April 4, 1992 (United States)
- Running time: 88 minutes
- Country: United States
- Language: English

Adventures in Dinosaur City (known as Dinosaurs: The Movie in the United Kingdom) is a 1991 American science fiction children's film directed by Brett Thompson and starring Omri Katz, Shawn Hoffman, Tiffanie Poston, Rob Sherwood, Patrick Labyorteaux, and David Jolliffe.

== Plot ==
Three teenage friends, named Timmy, Mick, and Jamie, enjoy watching an animated TV series called Dino Saurs, which features anthropomorphic dinosaurs and cavepeople. Wanting to watch the cartoon on a better screen, Timmy, the youngest of the three, suggests that they try watching it on the big TV screen in his parents' laboratory. However, this screen is part of an experimental device designed to open a portal to another dimension. After they put the videotape into the device and turn it on, a vortex sucks the three into the screen, and into the universe in which the show takes place.

They find that they are in a building in Saur City and come across Forry, a Rhamphorhynchus who lost his ability to fly. Shortly afterward, a group of cavepeople called the Rockies enter the building. They work for an Allosaurus named Mr. Big, a dictator who oppresses the residents of Saur City. The Rockies steal a fuse that is part of a cooling system for lava tanks. Without the fuse, the tanks will melt and the lava will destroy Saur City. Additionally, the kids think that they need the fuse in order to reopen the portal to their world and return home.

Although reluctant, Forry's knowledge of his world proves useful as he guides the three through a dinosaur graveyard and onward to Tar Town. Once there, they enter a bar and find a Tyrannosaurus named Rex and a Protoceratops named Tops. The kids expect them to help, since they are the main heroes of the cartoon show. Initially refusing to help, the two change their minds after the kids help them fight off the Rockies.

The group goes to Saur City and rests at Forry's tree house. Timmy talks to Rex about the possibility that all fictional stories really do happen in other worlds, and hints that he does not want to return to his world because it is boring. Meanwhile, romantic feelings develop between Mick and Jamie. Rex takes Timmy to a nearby island, and reveals that his father is considered a traitor who surrendered Saur City to Mr. Big. When the two return to the tree house, the group is attacked by the Rockies. During the battle, Timmy discovers that he can pause and rewind the Rockies by using the remote control that he brought with him from his parents' lab. Mr. Big witnesses this and orders the Rockies to get him the remote. The Rockies capture Timmy and take the remote. They then go to Mr. Big's tower.

Mick, Jamie, Rex, Tops, and Forry sneak into the tower's dungeon. They find Rex's imprisoned father, who reveals that Mr. Big used a mind-controlling potion to force him to surrender Saur City. The group sets the prisoners free, and Rex confronts Mr. Big as he is interrogating Timmy. During the ensuing battle, Mick and Tops rescue Timmy, and the group recovers the remote. Rex fights and nearly defeats Mr. Big, but Mr. Big grabs a sword. Just then, Timmy zaps Mr. Big with the remote, making him disappear.

The group begin to leave the tower by using the elevator, which relies on the fuse for power. Therefore, Forry stays behind until the others have left and then manages to fly the fuse out. Rex's father sacrifices himself to destroy the tower. The group go to the building containing the lava tanks and reattach the fuse. Timmy uses the remote to reopen the portal. Despite Timmy's reluctance to go, the kids return to their universe right before Timmy's parents return home from a scientific conference. The kids bring Timmy's parents into the lab to show them what happened, and then there is the sound of the device activating.

== Cast ==
- Omri Katz as Timmy
- Shawn Hoffman as Mick
- Tiffanie Poston as Jamie
- Pete Koch as Link
- Megan Hughes as Missy
- Kimberly Beck as Chanteuse
- Mimi Maynard as Dana
- Steven Anderson as Gil
- Irwin Keyes as Guard #1
- Barney Burman as Guard #2
- David Winter as Guard #3
- Jeffrey Asch as Bigfoot
- Sebastian Massa as Bear
- Kevin Thompson as Mr. Small

=== Voices ===
- Patrick Labyorteaux as Rex, Mr. Big
- David Jolliffe as Tops
- Rob Sherwood as Forry
- Spike Miller as Bartender
- Paul Eiding as King

=== In-suit performers ===
- Tony Doyle as Rex
- Marc Martorana as Tops
- Don Barnes as King
- R. A. Mihailoff as Mr. Big

== Release ==
=== Initial premiere ===
The film's initial premiere was a direct-to-video release in the United Kingdom in October 1991 under the title Dinosaurs: The Movie or simply Dinosaurs.

=== Theatrical release ===
In February 1992, the film was released in theaters in France under the French title Dinosaures.

=== Television premiere ===
The film had its world television premiere on The Disney Channel in the United States on April 4, 1992.

=== Later home media releases ===
The film was released in the United States on VHS and LaserDisc on August 20, 1992. In Europe, it has been rereleased on DVD.

== Video game ==
In 1992, video game publisher, Irem developed and published a video game adaptation loosely based on the film's plot and characters under the title DinoCity for the Super NES.

The game received mostly good to average review scores.

== See also ==
- List of films featuring dinosaurs
