= B.C. Butcher =

2016 horror comedy film by Kansas Bowling

- Promotional Poster
- Directed by: Kansas Bowling
- Written by: Kansas Bowling; Kenzie Givens
- Produced by: Lloyd Kaufman; Kansas Bowling
- Starring: Natasha Halevi; Kato Kaelin; Kadeem Hardison; Rodney Bingenheimer
- Cinematography: Richard Samuels
- Edited by: Robby DeFrain
- Music by: The Ugly Kids; Vicky and the Vengents; Hollywood Argyles
- Distributed by: Troma Entertainment
- Release date: January 8, 2016
- Running time: 51 minutes
- Country: United States
- Language: English

B.C. Butcher is a 2016 American horror comedy film directed by Kansas Bowling and starring Natasha Halevi, Kato Kaelin, Kadeem Hardison, and Rodney Bingenheimer. The film's plot is about a tribe of cavewomen being stalked by a prehistoric monster. It has been dubbed as "the first prehistoric slasher film". It was released in January 2016 by Troma Entertainment.

== Synopsis ==
A tribe of cavewomen sacrifice one of their members after it is revealed she is having an affair with Rex, the tribe leader's man. They leave her body in the wilderness and it is discovered by a prehistoric beast who falls in love with the dead cavewoman and vows to avenge her death. The monster, known as "The Butcher", hunts down the cavewomen responsible for her murder.

The film also features a music video interlude by Los Angeles punk band The Ugly Kids.

== Cast ==
- Leilani Fideler as Neandra
- Natasha Halevi as Anaconda
- Devyn Leah as Bamba
- Molly Elizabeth Ring as Poppy
- Miranda Robin as Dina
- Kato Kaelin as Rex
- Dwayne Marion Johnson as the Butcher
- Rodney Bingenheimer as himself
- Parker Love Bowling as Po
- Kadeem Hardison as the narrator
- Kansas Bowling as a model

== Production ==
Kansas Bowling wrote the screenplay to B.C. Butcher when she was 15, before production began two years later. It was shot on 16 mm film.

== Reception ==
A review at Horror News commented, "B.C. Butcher is the kind of film that seems like it was fun to be on the set. That same fun is not felt in the overall production. The story is muddled, the effects are terrible, the script is childish, and the acting is groan-worthy."
