= Kato Kaelin =

O. J. Simpson trial witness (born 1959)

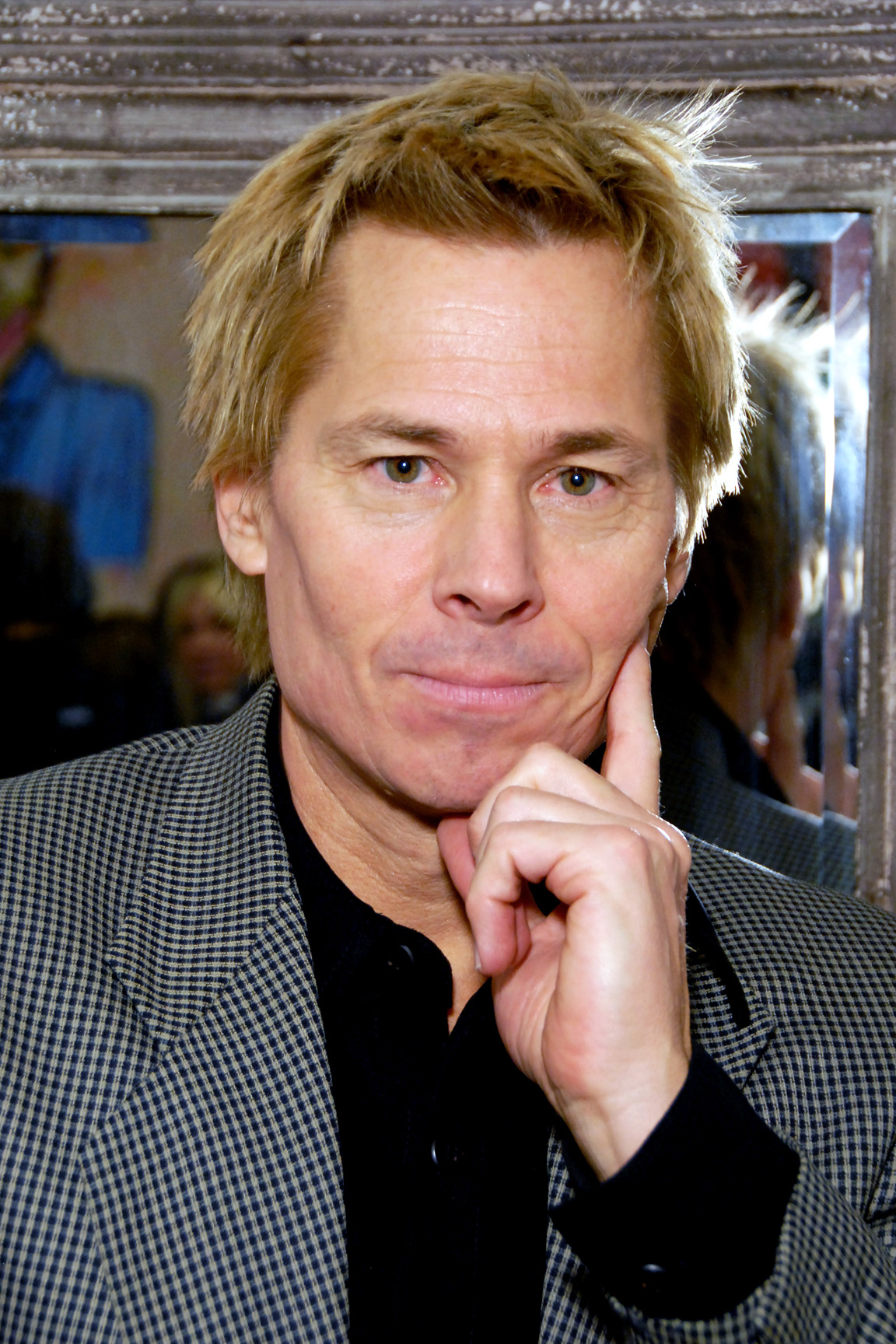
- Kaelin in 2011
- Born: Brian Gerard Kaelin; March 9, 1959 (age 67); Milwaukee, Wisconsin, US
- Occupations: Actor; media personality
- Years active: 1987–present
- Known for: Serving as a witness in the O.J. Simpson murder trial in 1995
- Spouse: Cynthia Coulter (m. 1983; div. 1989)

Brian Gerard "Kato" Kaelin (Note: Pronounced /ˈkeɪtoʊ ˈkeɪlɪn/.) (born March 9, 1959) is an American actor and radio and television personality. A friend of Nicole Brown Simpson, Kaelin is best known for serving as a witness in the O. J. Simpson murder trial in 1995, receiving considerable media attention during the trial.

== Early life and education ==
Brian Gerard Kaelin was born on March 9, 1959, in Milwaukee, Wisconsin. Kaelin was nicknamed "Kato" as a child after the Japanese character played by Bruce Lee on the television series The Green Hornet. He graduated from Nicolet High School in Glendale, Wisconsin, in 1977. He attended, but never graduated from the University of Wisconsin–Eau Claire. He pledged the Sigma Alpha Epsilon fraternity in the fall of 1980 and was accepted at the end of the term at California State University, Fullerton. During his time at Eau Claire he created his own talk show, Kato and Friends, and hosted The Gameshow on the campus television station, TV10. He eventually moved to Hollywood.

== Friendship with Nicole Brown Simpson ==
Kaelin met and became friends with Nicole Brown Simpson, the ex-wife of former NFL player and actor O.J. Simpson (O.J.), on a skiing trip in Aspen, Colorado, in December 1992. He later moved into the guesthouse on Brown's property on Gretna Green Way and lived there for a year. He paid rent and helped take care of Sydney and Justin, who were O.J. and Nicole's children, as part of the living arrangement. After Nicole moved to the home on Bundy Drive, Kaelin opted not to live with her, as the residence did not have a guesthouse and Kaelin felt uncomfortable renting a room inside the home. He then moved into a guesthouse on O.J. Simpson's Rockingham Avenue property. Kaelin ate takeout food from McDonald's with Simpson on June 12, 1994, the night Brown and her friend Ronald Goldman were stabbed to death outside Brown's condominium.

== O. J. Simpson murder trial ==
Kaelin was a minor witness for the prosecution in the 1995 O. J. Simpson murder trial. In 1994, he was staying in a guest house on Simpson's Rockingham estate and was present at the compound on the night of the two murders on June 12. He witnessed some of Simpson's movements before and after the time of the murders. His story seemed to contradict Simpson's version of the events on some key points, as he testified that he could not account for Simpson's whereabouts between 9:36 p.m. and 11:00 p.m. on the evening the murders took place, which the prosecution alleged occurred between 10:00 p.m. and 10:30 p.m. In spite of "valuable evidence" provided by Kaelin in his testimony, prosecutor Marcia Clark took the unusual step of having him declared a hostile witness, "allowing her to attack her own prosecution witness without repeated objections from Simpson's defense team." He received considerable media attention during the trial; one survey found that 74 percent of Americans could identify him.

=== Landmark libel case ===
After Simpson was acquitted, the cover of an issue of the tabloid newspaper National Examiner featured a photo of Kaelin without his shirt on, with the headline "Cops think Kato did it!" The article within the issue alleged that police suspected Kaelin of perjury. Kaelin sued the publisher, Globe Communications, for libel, alleging that the cover headline implied he was suspected of the murders. The federal District Court for Central California dismissed the case, saying the story was not libelous or malicious. This was reversed by the US Court of Appeals for the Ninth Circuit, which ruled:

We hold that reasonable jurors could find that clear and convincing evidence established: (1) the front page headline falsely insinuated that the police believed that Kaelin committed the murders; and (2) the false insinuation was not necessarily cured by ... subheading or by the non-defamatory story about Kaelin that appeared 17 pages away. We also hold that Kaelin produced sufficiently clear and convincing evidence of the newspaper's knowledge of falsity or reckless disregard for the truth of its headline to defeat a motion for summary judgment.

The decision was a landmark case in libel law, finding that a headline could be considered libel. Kaelin later settled the US$15 million lawsuit with Globe Communications out of court for an undisclosed amount.

== Career ==
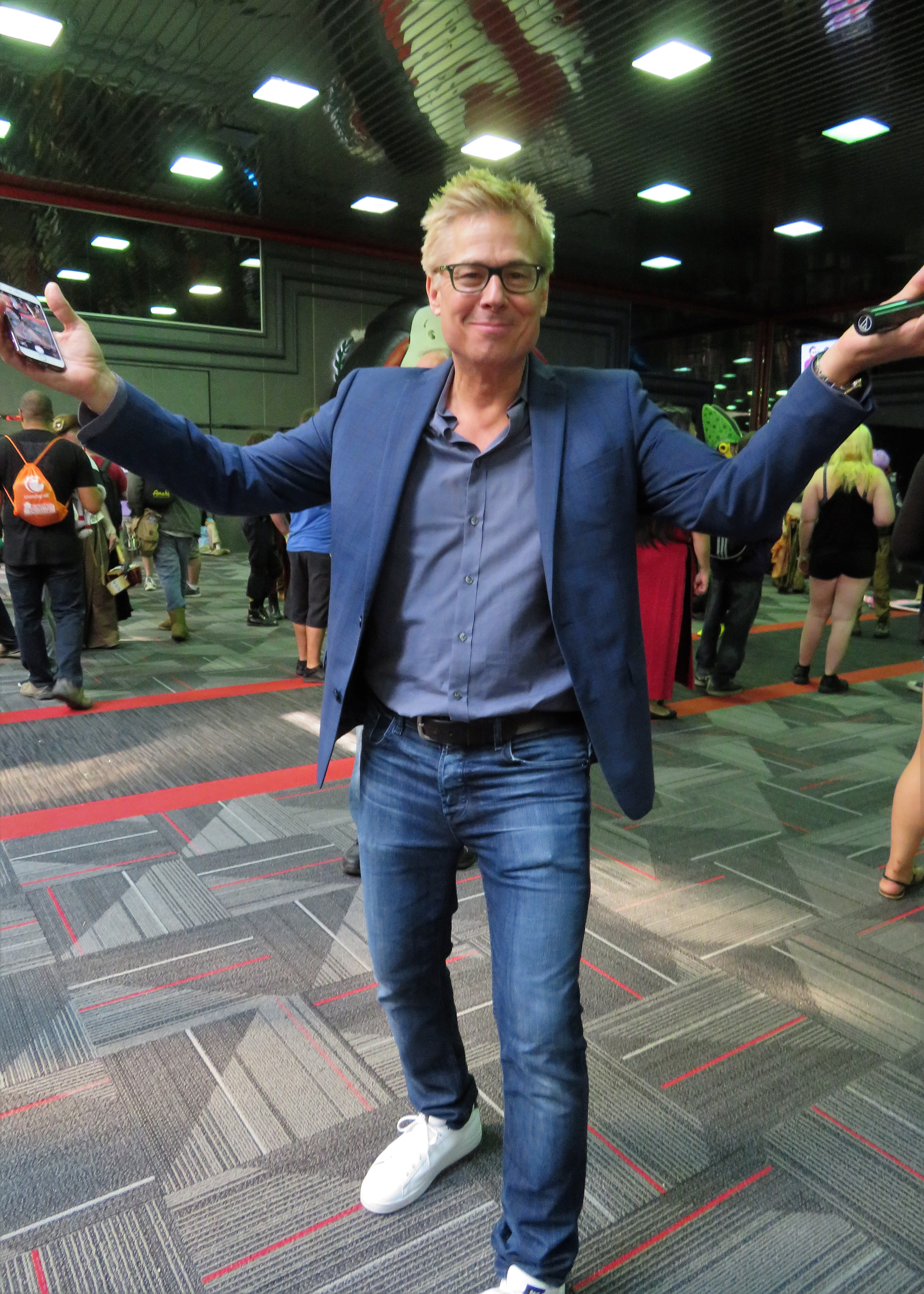
Kaelin at the 2018 Wizarding World Con in Chicago

Before his involvement in the O. J. Simpson trial, Kaelin appeared in the beach comedy movie Beach Fever (1987), in which his character created a love potion with his friend and hit on girls at the beach; he also starred in Night Shadow (1989), a low budget horror movie.

Kaelin briefly made national headlines when he said he never told the New York Post columnist Cindy Adams that Simpson definitely killed his former wife, Nicole Brown Simpson. He said he has expressed his opinion before, that he thinks Simpson did it, but "I have no firsthand knowledge."

Soon after the trial, Kaelin appeared on the first episode of the Fox sketch comedy MADtv (October 1995) and made a cameo appearance on the HBO sketch comedy Mr. Show with Bob and David during the series' first season (November 1995); in the latter series' episode titled "We Regret to Inform You", he shows up at lobotomized actor Borden Grote's party. He appeared in the feature film The Still Life (2006) and had a minor role in National Lampoon's Dorm Daze 2 (2006). In February 2009, Kaelin guest-starred in the web series Star-ving and the movie Whacked. He was a guest on Politically Incorrect with Bill Maher, on March 29, 1995.

In 1995, from the popularity of the Howard Stern Show, the Los Angeles radio station 97.1 KLSX which had played Classic Rock after Stern in the morning, switched to an All Talk format, and Kato Kaelin, along with standup comic Bobby Hellman, hosted an afternoon show (following Susan Olsen and Ken Ober). Kato wound up hosting without Bobby, and the gig lasted about a year.

Kaelin has made numerous forays into reality television. In 2002, he participated in the series Celebrity Boot Camp. In 2004, he participated in the development of a reality show called House Guest, in which he would live in other celebrities' homes; that show never aired. He was seen on an episode of the E! reality series Sunset Tan, asking specifically for a "farmer's tan". He was also a guest player on the sixth episode of the Comedy Central series Reality Bites Back. In 2008, he was a contestant in the Fox Reality Channel show Gimme My Reality Show, in which minor celebrities competed to receive their own reality show.

Kaelin has also participated in game shows. He appeared on the NBC version of The Weakest Link (2002). He was a contestant on the game shows Russian Roulette as well as the reality dating show BZZZ! hosted by Annie Wood. In 2005, he appeared in the first three National Lampoon's Strip Poker pay-per-view programs (Kaelin is an avid poker player); the titles were filmed at Hedonism II, a naturist resort in Negril, Jamaica, which led him to quip, "The first few days there were the hardest!" The Playboy bunnies, WWE Divas, and pin-up models competing in the no-limit Texas hold 'em games, and upon losing all their chips and clothes, had to dive into the "Pool of Shame" and visit "Kato's Guesthouse", where he would interview the nude defeated players. He also appeared in numerous comedic skits.

Kaelin also has worked as a radio and television host. For a short time in 1995, he worked as a radio talk host on KLSX in Los Angeles, and provided online content for National Lampoon. From June 2005 to some time in 2006, Kaelin co-hosted Eye for an Eye, a daytime TV court show syndicated in 34 countries. Kaelin was a recurring guest on the video game review show X-Play.

Kaelin has also appeared in several parodies. In 2009, he was seen on the series Tosh.0, in a parody of the Keyboard Cat video titled "Keyboard Kato". And in 2010, Kaelin appeared on Real Time with Bill Maher, wearing a wig to play his younger self in a taped skit parodying 1990s television appearances by 2010 US senatorial candidate Christine O'Donnell.

Since 2011, Kaelin has hosted the TV talk show Tailgating with Kato.

In 2016, he made a brief appearance on the FX comedy series Baskets, where he performed the national anthem at a rodeo.

In 2016, Kaelin appeared in the Troma Entertainment film B.C. Butcher.

In 2019, Kaelin was a house guest in the second American season of the reality show competition Celebrity Big Brother. He was evicted by a 5-0 vote on February 4, 2019, finishing in 8th place out of 12 house guests.

== Personal life ==
Kaelin was close friends with the actor and comedian Norm Macdonald from mid-2000 to mid-2001, according to Macdonald's The Norm Show co-star Artie Lange. He was even given a guest role on the show. He and Macdonald had a falling out that ended their friendship.

== Filmography ==
=== Film ===
Year	Title	Role	Notes
1987	Beach Fever	Chat Frederick IV	
1989	Night Shadow	Dean Lesher	
1992	Prototype	Regalia	
1994	Save Me	Bond Trader #1 / Police Officer	
1994	Hail Caesar	Party guest	Uncredited
1994	Cyborg 3: The Recycler	Beggar	Direct-to-video
1994	Inner Sanctum II	Extra	Uncredited
1996	For Life or Death	Kato	
1998	BASEketball	Driveway Announcer	
1999	The Decade	Kree	Uncredited
2003	Pauly Shore Is Dead	Kato Kaelin	
2006	The Still Life	Photographer	
2006	National Lampoon's Dorm Daze 2	Celebrity Judge #3	Direct-to-video
2007	Revamped	Jonathan	Direct-to-video
2009	Ratko: The Dictator's Son	Roman the Architect	
2011	Panman	New Panman	
2015	Sacred Blood	Thaddeus Wilson	
2015	Bob Thunder: Internet Assassin	Record Label Executive	
2016	B.C. Butcher	Rex	
2018	Flesh Blanket	Kato Kaelin	

=== Television ===
Year	Title	Role	Notes
1995	The Watcher	Joseph Weston	Episode: "Second Chances: Last Time Around/Jack Flash/Hit Man"
1995	Mr. Show with Bob and David	Party guest	Episode: "We Regret to Inform You"
1998, 1999	Unhappily Ever After	Smoking Teacher / Happy Bender	2 episodes
1999	Beggars and Choosers	Kato Kaelin	3 episodes
2001	The Norm Show	Rick	Episode: "Norm vs. Homelessness"
2002	Fatal Kiss	Jonathan	Television film
2002	Dog Eat Dog	Himself	Contestant
2003	Sabrina the Teenage Witch	Instructor	Episode: "Present Perfect"
2009	Star-ving	Kato	Episode: "Starving... Literally"
2009	Tosh.0	Keyboard Kato	Episode: "Afro Ninja"
2009	Valley Peaks	Bronson Greywolf	Episode: "The Future's Beginnings: Part 3"
2010	Laugh Track Mash-ups	Teacher	Episode: "Late for Class!"
2011	Can't Get Arrested	Kato	2 episodes
2013	The Eric Andre Show	Self	Episode: "Scott Porter/Brutus "The Barber" Beefcake"
2014	Winners	Kato Kaelin	Episode: "Home Alone"
2014	Beverley Hills Pawn	Self	Episode: "Hornet and a Haunting"
2015	The PET Squad Files	Rise and Shine USA Host	Episode: "Welcome to F***ing Hollywood"
2016	Baskets	Singer	Episode: "Renior"
2018	Guest House Rent	Kato	Television film
2018	Weird Bizarre and Psychotic	Host	Television film
2018	The Last Sharknado: It's About Time	Viking King	Television film
2019	Celebrity Big Brother	Himself	Houseguest; 8th Place
2025	American Manhunt: OJ Simpson	Himself	
