= Charlotte Sartre =

American pornographic film actress and director

- Occupation: Pornographic film actress
- Years active: 2015–present

Charlotte Sartre is an American pornographic film actress and director known for her work in fetish-oriented adult entertainment.

She won the 2019 AVN Award and Transgender Erotica Awards for Best Non-TS Female Performer in 2020 and 2022. In 2023, she won the fan-voted Favorite Fetish Model award at the Pornhub Awards.

== Career ==
Sartre has stated that she became interested in pornography after discovering the actress Sasha Grey.

In 2014, she began working as a camgirl. Her pornographic film debut came in August 2015 and her scenes have featured fetishistic themes, such as bondage and sadomasochism.

=== Fetish and alternative adult work ===
Sartre became associated with the alternative and fetish-oriented adult entertainment scene through her work with companies including Burning Angel and Kink.com. Her work has focused on BDSM-related themes, including female dominance or ballbusting.

Sartre has also worked as a director for fetish-oriented websites. In 2021, she made her directorial debut for Kink.com and later directed content for SweetFemdom, a website focused on female-dominance content.

=== Public persona ===
Her stage name comes from the French existentialist philosopher Jean-Paul Sartre, a writer for whom she has great appreciation. She also has a tattoo featuring the name of his work Nausea on her chest.

She has used the persona "Goth Charlotte" as part of her public identity, reflecting her interest in gothic aesthetics and alternative culture.

== Awards and nominations ==
Year	Ceremony	Result	Prize	Work
2017	AVN Awards	Nominated	Fan Award: Most groundbreaking debutant	
2018	AVN Awards	Nominated	Best Sex Scene in a Foreign Production	Rocco: Sex Analyst
2018	XBIZ Awards	Nominated	Best Lesbian Movie Sex Scene	Ms. Grey 2: Darker
2019	AVN Awards	Won	Best Scandalous Sex Scene	The Puppet Inside Me
2019	AVN Awards		Fan Award: Most Epic Ass	
2020	AVN Awards	Nominated	Best Scandalous Sex Scene	Families Tied (44663)
2021	AVN Awards	Nominated	Best M-H-M Trio Scene	A Burlesque Story
2021	XBIZ Awards	Nominated	Best VR Sex Scene	Crushing Convictions
2023	AVN Awards	Nominated	Best group sex scene	Going Up – Episode 2
2023	AVN Awards	Nominated	Best Lesbian Group Sex Scene	Going Up – Episode 6

== Personal life ==
Sartre was in a relationship with Till Lindemann, the lead vocalist and lyricist of the band Rammstein. In 2019, she married pornographic actor and director Lance Hart (now Lucy Hart), which ended in divorce in 2021. During their marriage, the couple produced scenes with both Burning Angel and Kink.com. Afterwards, in 2021, Charlotte had a short relationship with former porn star (Sue Lightning) turned video game YouTuber, Suzi Hunter aka TheSphereHunter. She currently lives in Las Vegas.

Off-camera, Sartre typically watches basketball and baseball and smokes marijuana. She enjoys listening to music by Whitney Houston, David Bowie, or Three 6 Mafia. She also owns nine tarantulas and enjoys taxidermy as a hobby.
