= Dylan Greenberg =

American film director and musician

- 2013 portrait of Dylan Greenberg
- Born: May 8, 1997 (age 29); New York City, New York, U.S.
- Occupation: Film director
- Years active: 2005–present
- Parent: Keith Elliot Greenberg

Dylan Greenberg, often styled Dylan Mars Greenberg, is an American cult film director and musician known for her distinctive style of absurdist camp surrealism that is present across her multimedia body of work.

She is most notable for her music video work, directing the 2024 film Spirit Riser The 2015 film Dark Prism and the horror parody of Re-Animator entitled Re-Agitator: Revenge of the Parody starring Aurelio Voltaire Hernandez and Alan Merrill.

Her musical career includes serving as the front woman for glam rock, art pop band Theophobia, based in New York City.

She has directed content for Adult Swim and Rage (TV program). Greenberg has directed music videos for Michael C. Hall's band Princess Goes to the Butterfly Museum, Speedy OrtizJames Chance and the Contortions A Place to Bury Strangers Mac Gollehon Blondie keyboardist Matt Katz-Bohen's solo project with his wife Laurel, Pastel Confession and Suicide Squeeze Records band Death Valley Girls.

== Early life ==
Greenberg was born in Manhattan, New York to parents Keith Elliot Greenberg and Jennifer Berton and was raised in Brooklyn. She directed her first feature film at 17, and has since directed and co-directed seven released feature films.

== Career ==
Greenberg often directs music videos that are featured in heavy rotation on Rage (TV program) including for her own band Theophobia. Greenberg is also known for her work with Troma Entertainment and Lloyd Kaufman. Greenberg co-starred in Kaufman's film "Shakespeare's Shitstorm" with Debbie Rochon.

=== Spirit Riser ===
Greenberg completed the film Spirit Riser in 2024 which premiered at Museum of the Moving Image. The film starred Greenberg's close collaborator Amanda Flowers along with Kansas Bowling, Alan Merrill, Dorian Electra, Kate Bornstein, Patti Harrison, Ryan Trecartin, Lloyd Kaufman and was narrated by Michael Madsen. The film was released via Vinegar Syndrome on Blu Ray and MVD Entertainment Group on streaming.

=== The Triangular Door ===
Greenberg directed the short film The Triangular Door, shot entirely on Super8 film and narrated by Guy Maddin and featuring Adam Green. The film premiered at MIX NYC in 2024 and was exhibited nationwide as part of a package of short films entitled CYBERSLIME.

=== Sir Isengord and the Theory of the Magnificent Spinning Quasi Table ===
Greenberg directed the 30 minute short film Sir Isengord and the Theory of the Magnificent Spinning Quasi Table which premiered in NoBudge. The film was featured in an article in Gizmodo after it was revealed the film was based on obscure Facebook memes created by the director's friends. Sir Isengord starred Joe Estevez Jon Leiberman and Bill Weeden.

=== Dark Prism ===
Greenberg directed the microbudget feature film Dark Prism (2015) while she was still in high school, which featured appearances by Lloyd Kaufman, Matt Katz-Bohen, and Mac DeMarco. At age 18 Greenberg was able to garner press from Rolling Stone, Vice, Pitchfork and more, arguably making it the most internationally discussed feature film to have a total budget under 1,000 dollars of 2015. Dark Prism showed internationally at Festivalito De La Palma festival in the Canary Islands to critical acclaim and is now available to watch on Amazon Prime.

=== The Puppeteer’s Assistant ===
In 2021, Greenberg directed a short film for the Adult Swim compilation “Smalls Volume 5” entitled “The Puppeteer’s Assistant”. The film utilized a combination of live action and computer animation.

=== Amityville: Vanishing Point ===
Greenberg directed a feature film titled Amityville: Vanishing Point which served as a David Lynch inspired dark parody of horror films.

=== ReAgitator: Revenge of the Parody ===
Hoping to take the parody element further, Greenberg directed the feature film ReAgitator: Revenge of the Parody as a queer and woman centered Dada inspired homage to horror films such as Re-Animator and The Pit and the Pendulum.

=== The Bathtub ===
In 2020, Greenberg released a short film starring Bob Bert of Sonic Youth called The Bathtub. The actors were shot entirely on green screen and then inserted into carefully placed miniatures, to create the illusion of the action taking place inside of dollhouses. The film premiered in Yahoo Entertainment.
