= Harley Poe =

American folk punk band

- Origin: Kokomo, Indiana
- Genres: Folk punk
- Years active: 2004–present
- Members: Joseph Whiteford; Gregg Manfredi; Cristian Riquelme; Wesley Plantenga
- Past members: Kevin Phillips; Adam Kerr; Chad Serhal; Mike Wilson; Christopher Thomas
- Website: harleypoe.bandcamp.com

Harley Poe is an American folk punk band formed in Kokomo, Indiana. Originating from the members of Christian punk band Calibretto 13 after it disbanded, the band has released 15 albums, including Satan, Sex and No Regrets, which was voted best album of 2012 by Rue Morgue. Described as "murder folk" and "extremely dark", their lyrics focus on horror film and related topics.

== History ==
Harley Poe began from frontman Joseph Whiteford's previous band, Calibretto 13 (later Calibretto). Soon before Calibretto 13 ended, Whiteford wanted to create a band that would sing about horror film themes; after Calibretto 13's label ended their contract and the band broke up, he started Harley Poe. The origin of the band's name is dubious; Whiteford has said that he "always give[s] a different answer... because it's kind of lame". He has variously claimed that he "thought it had a good ring to it" and wanted the band's name to be a person's name, that "Harley" came from Ed Harley in the movie Pumpkinhead and "Poe" from the last name of one of Whiteford's role models at a church group, or that Harley Poe was the name of a neighbour of Whiteford's that was murdered by his friends in his youth.

In 2012, Harley Poe released Satan, Sex and No Regrets on Chain Smoking Records, which was voted best album of the year by Rue Morgue.

In 2015, Whiteford announced that the band would be going on a hiatus, playing their final show before the hiatus on Halloween night that year. Whiteford later stated this hiatus was due to him having issues in his marriage and wanting full control over his music. The band's 2017 album Lost and Losing It stemmed from those issues with his marriage and his later divorce.

In 2019, Harley Poe appeared in Scary Stories, a documentary about the Scary Stories to Tell in the Dark series, performing their cover of the folk song "The Hearse Song". Whiteford also talked about his childhood connection to the books.

Other than Whiteford, fifteen different musicians have been members of the band.

== Musical style ==
Harley Poe has been described as acoustic punk, folk punk, or murder folk with horror aspects. Their music has been variously described as "a toe-tapping, gore filled, blood splattered romp", "carefully crafted and additively immersive", "creative and twisted", and permeated by the influence of horror films, with their lyrics (which often discuss horror film themes) being described as "extremely dark, demented and twisted beyond belief" and "some of the most deranged lyrics in the genre". Their music is inspired by bands such as Violent Femmes, The Tiger Lillies, and The Cramps.

== Discography ==
=== Albums ===
- In The Dark: Or, B Movie Trash! (2004)
- The Dead and the Naked (2006)
- Wretched. Filthy. Ugly. (2010)
- Satan, Sex and No Regrets (2012)
- B-Sides from the Basement (2012)
- Pagan Holiday (2013)
- Fallen Down (2015)
- Lost and Losing It (2017)
- Alive and Alone (2018)
- Have a Great Life. (2019)
- 7 Inches of Hell (2021), originally released as 7-inch singles through Horrorhound Magazine
- Uke Puke (2021)
- Horrorful (2022)
- Little Joey and the Psychophallic Sex Brain (2023)
- Big Feelings (2025)

=== EPs ===
- Harley Poe and the Dead Vampires (2007)
- The Serhal Sessions (2012)
- Man of God (2013)
- Pinocchio Pariah (2020)

=== Singles ===
- It's Christmas Time Again (2006)
- Merry Christmas 2015 (2015)
- Ticks (2021)
- Welcome to Slime City (2021)

All discography info per Spotify.
