= Death Valley Girls =

American rock band

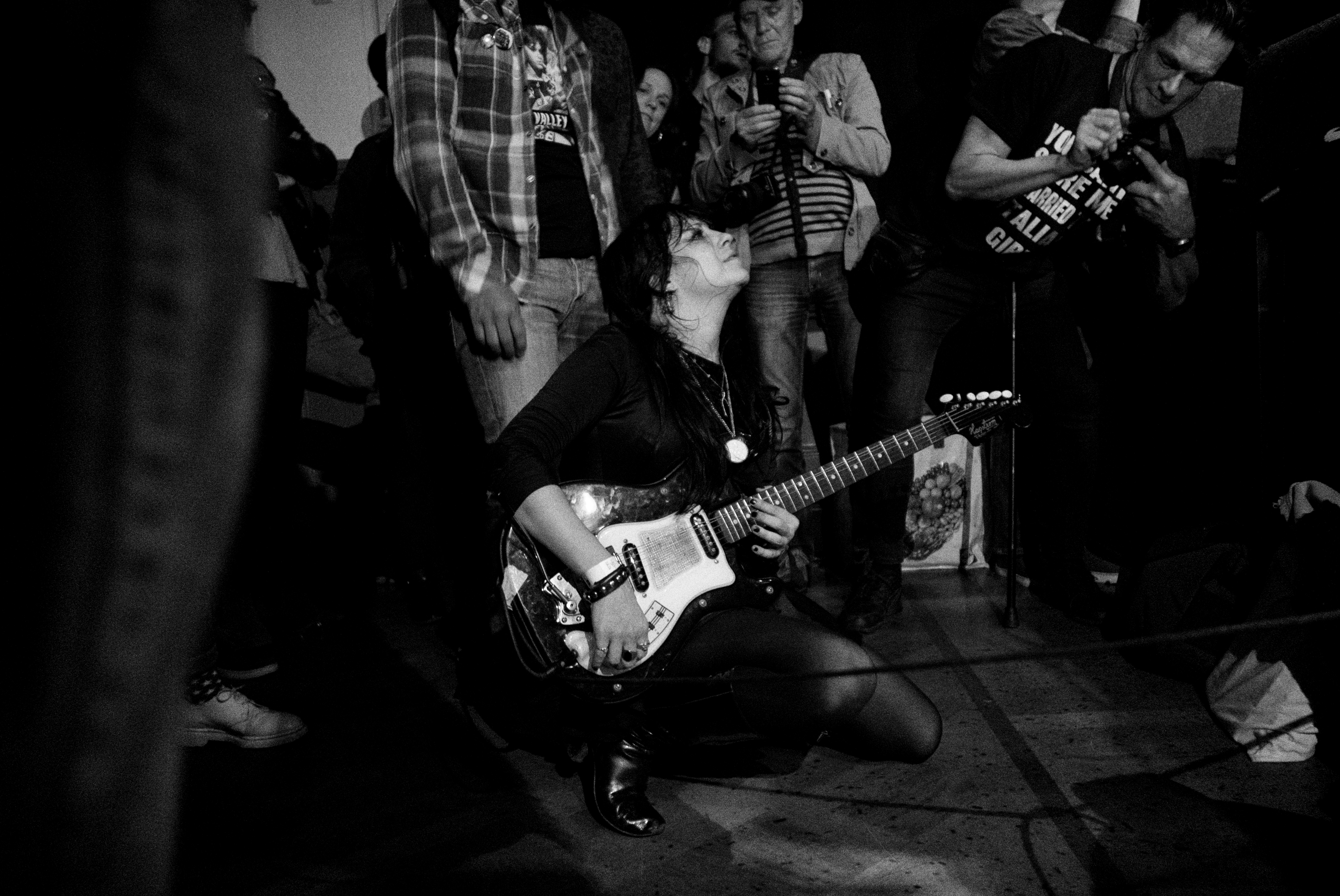
- Death Valley Girls in 2017

Background information
- Origin: Los Angeles, California, United States
- Genres: Garage rock, punk rock, gothic rock
- Years active: 2013–present
- Label: Suicide Squeeze Records
- Members: Bonnie Bloomgarden; Sarah Safaie; Bailey Chapman; Laena Myers
- Past members: Patty Schemel; Rachel Orosco; Laura Kelsey; Alana Amram; Jessie Jones; Nicole "Pickle" Smith; Larry Schemel; Rikki Styxx
- Website: deathvalleygirls.bandcamp.com

Death Valley Girls is an American rock band formed in 2013 in Los Angeles, California.

== History ==
Death Valley Girls was formed in 2013 by Patty Schemel, her brother Larry Schemel, Rachel Orosco, and Bonnie Bloomgarden after the group needed "something safe to do that wasn't AA". Patty Schemel left the band after the release of their debut album Street Venom in 2014, an album which received praise for its raw garage rock sound and what Flood Magazine described as "doom-boogie, psych-pop". Laura Kelsey replaced Patty on drums for Street Venom.

In 2016, the band released Glow in the Dark, with Alana Amram replacing Rachel Orosco and Jessie Jones joining the band as a co-vocalist.

In 2018, the band began working with Seattle-based label Suicide Squeeze Records, releasing their 2018 album Darkness Rains and Under the Spell of Joy (2020) under the label. Thanks to these albums, Death Valley Girls received critical acclaim for their memorable stage performances and dynamic mix of garage rock, punk, and psych rock. Under the Spell of Joy saw Rikki Styxx as the new drummer and Nicole "Pickle" Smith added as a bassist.

In 2023, the band released their album, Islands in the Sky. Brooklyn Vegan reported that Islands is "loaded with catchy psych-rock affirmations to the future." This album also saw the lineup reaching the form of Larry Schemel, Bonnie Bloomgarden, Sammy Westervelt, and Rikki Styxx.

Death Valley Girls have performed at several notable music festivals, including Desert Daze and Levitation Festival.

== Musical style ==
Death Valley Girls' music is characterized by a blend of garage rock, punk, psych rock, gothic rock, and elements of surf rock and 1960s girl groups. The band's live performances focus around Bloomgarden's vocals and on-stage theatricality.

== Discography ==
=== Studio albums ===
- Street Venom (2014)
- Glow in the Dark (2016)
- Darkness Rains (2018)
- Under the Spell of Joy (2020)
- Islands in the Sky (2023)
- Welcome to Earth (2026)

=== EPs ===
- Death Valley Girls (2013)
- Electric High (2014)
- Breakthrough (2020)
- The Universe (2022)

=== Singles ===
- "When I'm Free (Peaches Remix)" (2012)
- "It's All Really Kind of Amazing" (2021)
- "Sisters of the Moon"/"Fire and Brimstone" (2025)
