= Lee Quarnstrom =

American journalist (1939 – 2021 )

Lee Quarnstrom 13 Nov 1939 – September 29, 2021 was an American journalist, executive editor of Larry Flynt’s Hustler Magazine, and a Beatnik. He was a core member of the Merry Pranksters, a group loosely led by novelist Ken Kesey.

== Career ==
Quarnstrom grew up in Longview, Washington, and the Chicago suburb of Wilmette, Illinois, where he attended New Trier High School. Quarnstrom's journalism career began with the City News Bureau of Chicago, which soon gave way to his cross-country adventures. As a post-Beat Generation, pre-Hippie beatnik, Quarnstrom lived in San Francisco, Greenwich Village, Seattle, Mexico City, and Ken Kesey’s remote home in the Santa Cruz Mountains above the San Francisco Bay Area. At a cabin in La Honda, California, where Quarnstrom lived, frequent visitors included the Hells Angels and The Warlocks, who were precursors to the Grateful Dead. The notorious parties held at La Honda involved fluorescent paints, black lights, and LSD. This was the start of what came to be known as The Acid Tests, which Quarnstrom helped organize. The events from La Honda are described in Tom Wolfe's book, The Electric Kool-Aid Acid Test and Hunter S. Thompson's Hell's Angels: The Strange and Terrible Saga of the Outlaw Motorcycle Gangs. Quarnstrom's marriage to Space Daisy at Bill Graham's Fillmore Auditorium is documented in the book The Summer of Love: Haight-Ashbury At Its Highest.

In 1965, police invaded the La Honda home, arresting 14 people on marijuana charges, including Lee Quarnstrom, Ken Kesey, and Neal Cassady. Other friends and associates of Quarnstrom included spiritual leader Ram Dass, The Realist founder Paul Krassner, counterculture activist Wavy Gravy, and Jerry Garcia's former wife, Carolyn Garcia (then known as Mountain Girl).

== Family ==
Lee was a genealogist and often had contact with his relatives. Lee was partly Swedish on his father Gordon's side. His mother Lenore was of Irish descent. Lee had a good relationship with his brother Dean. Especially with Dean's kids who he really loved meeting. Quarnstrom and his wife Christine, a poet, lived with their pet Welsh corgis in Southern California. His previous wife, Denise, who was also a teacher and poet, was forced by him to take his two older corgis, Ruben and Fedora, to be put down because he couldn’t stand the hair problems.

== Merry Pranksters ==
As a member of The Merry Pranksters, Quarnstrom got on the bus named Furthur — so named for its destination. The bus was a converted school bus, painted in a wild array of psychedelic design. Neal Cassady drove Further on its initial road trip from La Honda, California, to New York City to celebrate publication of Ken Kesey's 1964 novel, Sometimes a Great Notion.

This inaugural trip was filmed by the Pranksters. Footage appears in the 2011 documentary film, Magic Trip.

== Memoir: When I Was a Dynamiter! ==
In 2014, Quarnstrom's memoir was published by Punk Hostage Press. The book provides an inside look at America's beat/hip/psychedelic counterculture of the 1950s and 1960s. When I Was a Dynamiter! Or How a Nice Catholic Boy Became a Merry Prankster, a Pornographer and a Bridegroom Seven Times, is both autobiography and a valuable history of mid-century American Bohemia, the last days of journalism and the heyday of psychedelic drugs.

Quarnstrom describes rubbing shoulders and making friends with a wide spectrum of well-known writers and artists – such as Paul Krassner, founder and editor of The Realist, the late Gonzo journalist Hunter S. Thompson, poet Allen Ginsberg, death-and-dying spiritual counselor Stephen Levine, musicians such as Janis Joplin and the Grateful Dead's Jerry Garcia, and Neal Cassady, hero of several Jack Kerouac novels and driver of Further, Kesey's psychedelically painted old school bus.

When I Was a Dynamiter! also recounts his ongoing sorrow following the 1982 fatal shooting of his 18-year-old son, Eric, near some of the San Francisco beatnik bars where Quarnstrom had hung out with other writers and artists and musicians.

In 2015, Lee Quarnstrom appeared at Beyond Baroque Literary Arts Center in Venice, California to read from his memoir and at the Bookshop Santa Cruz as part of a 50th anniversary celebration of the Prankster's first Acid Test.

Quanstrom died in La Habra, California, on September 29, 2021, at the age of 81.
