= Going Furthur =

2016 documentary film

- Directed by: Lindsay Kent; Colby Rex O'Neill; Matt Pidutti
- Story by: Lauren Harris; Lindsay Kent; Alexander Polinsky
- Produced by: Lindsay Kent; Colby Rex O'Neill; Matt Pidutti
- Starring: Wavy Gravy; Alex Grey; Allyson Grey; Andrew Keegan; Zane Kesey; Troy Brandon Kingston; Sam Cutler
- Narrated by: Alexander Polinsky
- Cinematography: Lindsay Kent; Colby Rex O'Neill; Matt Pidutti
- Edited by: Lindsay Kent; Colby Rex O'Neill; Matt Pidutti
- Music by: Joel Goffin
- Production companies: Lotus Eaters Films; Krenshaw Films
- Release date: June 4, 2016 (San Francisco DocFest)
- Running time: 96 minutes
- Countries: United States; Canada
- Language: English

Going Furthur is a 2016 American-Canadian documentary film directed by Lindsay Kent, Colby Rex O'Neill and Matt Pidutti.A The film covers the journey of Ken Kesey's bus Furthur, back on the road in 2014 for a 75-day trip covering 15,000 miles, along with a group of new Merry Pranksters.

== Synopsis ==
Furthur is a retrofitted school bus purchased by author Ken Kesey in 1964 to carry his "Merry Band of Pranksters" cross-country. The bus was also featured in Tom Wolfe's 1968 book The Electric Kool-Aid Acid Test.

In Summer of 2014, Zane Kesey, son of Ken, took a replica of Furthur on the first major trip since Ken took the bus to Europe in 1999, on a 15,000 mile tour of the United States, stopping at music festivals and other events. The bus makes stops at The Chapel of Sacred Mirrors, Alex Grey and Allyson Grey's art sanctuary, Millbrook, New York, the infamous home of Timothy Leary and Woodstock's 45th anniversary. The film features archival footage of Hunter S. Thompson, and features interviews with Alex Grey, Lee Quarnstrom, Ken Babbs, George Walker and Wavy Gravy. The filmmakers later made six trips to complete the film, including visiting Burning Man festival.

== Release ==
The film had its premiere at San Francisco DocFest in June 2016. It also played at Maui Film Festival, Whistler Film Festival, Byron Bay Film Festival, San Juan Film Festival and had a screening at Burning Man.

The film was nominated for an Alliance of Women Film Journalists award at the Whistler Film Festival.

=== Home media ===
In 2021 the film was released through streaming services.
