= Sepulveda Unitarian Universalist Society =

Church in California, United States

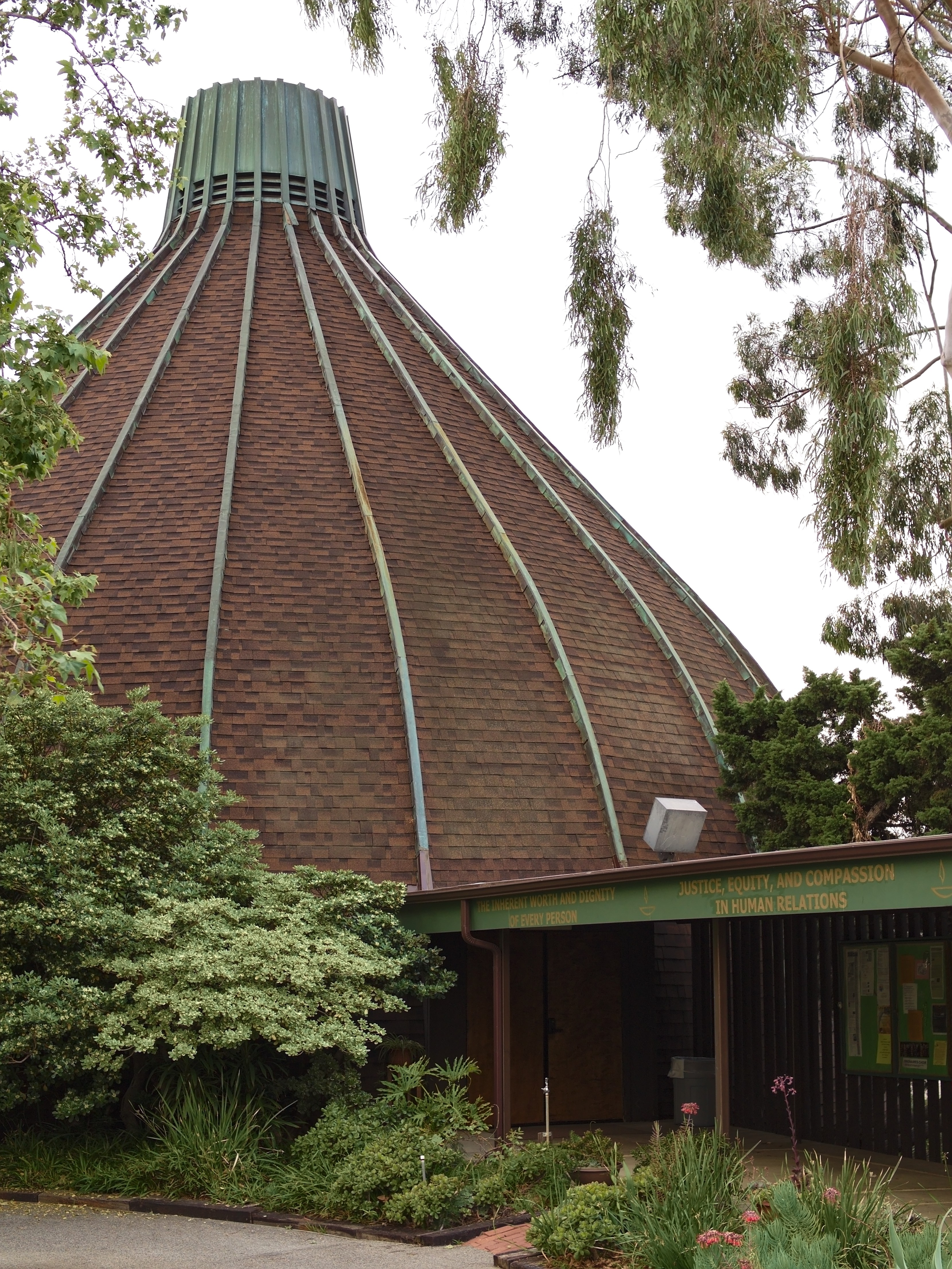
The building in 2016

Sepulveda Unitarian Universalist Society is a Unitarian Universalist church in Granada Hills, Los Angeles, California; holding services every Sunday at 17622 Chatsworth St.

Its former home in North Hills is a distinctive building known as the Onion, designated Los Angeles Historic-Cultural Monument #975 in 2010.

== History ==
The present-day Sepulveda Unitarian Universalist Society was founded in 1943 as the United Liberal Church of the Valley. It later became the People's Church of the San Fernando Valley and then in 1956 the Valley Unitarian Universalist Church.

In the early 1960s the congregation found itself in need of a larger space and bought a five-acre ranch property in North Hills. They chose Frank Ehrenthal, a Universalist and contemporary of Richard Neutra, to design the new building. After talking with and observing the members of the congregation, Ehrenthal designed a round building where people could face each other on an equal footing. “The Onion” was completed in 1964 and is built of glued laminated timber beams that curve from the foundation to the flat point at the top of the roof. The entire building is covered with composition (originally wood) shingles.

In February 1966 “The Onion’’ became the site of one of the famous Acid Tests put on by the Merry Pranksters. The then-minister of the church, Paul Sawyer, had met Pranksters' leader Ken Kesey at the annual California Unitarian Church conference at Asilomar State Beach. According to Sawyer's memoir, Prankster Ken Babbs called to ask if they could put on an Acid Test, and Sawyer said they could as long as they didn't give out acid (LSD) to the audience.

A decline in membership to the Unitarian church led to its sale in 2021 to El Camino Metro Church, currently Vida Church.
