= Ed McClanahan =

American writer (1932–2021)

- Born: Edward Poage McClanahan; October 5, 1932; Brooksville, Kentucky, U.S.
- Died: November 27, 2021 (aged 89)
- Occupation: Novelist; essayist; professor
- Education: Washington and Lee University; Miami University (BA); University of Kentucky (MA)
- Spouse: Katherine Andrews (m. 1957) Cia White (m. 1975) Hilda
- Children: 5
- Parents: Edward Leroy McClanahan; Jessie Poage

Edward Poage McClanahan (October 5, 1932 – November 27, 2021) was an American novelist, essayist, and professor.

== Biography ==
McClanahan was born in Brooksville, Kentucky on October 5, 1932, to Edward Leroy and Jessie (Poage) McClanahan. He attended school there and later in nearby Maysville, Kentucky, where the family relocated in 1948. McClanahan attended Washington and Lee University for one year before leaving for Miami University, where he received a B.A. in English in 1955. He briefly attended Stanford University's graduate English program during the 1955–1956 academic year, where he studied under Richard Scowcroft and Malcolm Cowley; after failing to acclimate to the program, he received an M.A. in English from the University of Kentucky in 1958. From 1958 to 1962, McClanahan taught first-year composition and a creative writing course previously taught by Bernard Malamud as an instructor at Oregon State University.

He received a Stegner Fellowship in Stanford University's non-degree creative writing program for the 1962–1963 academic year. Immediately thereafter, he was selected for a Jones Lectureship by program director Wallace Stegner. During his time at Stanford—where he was also known by his hippie moniker "Captain Kentucky"—McClanahan became good friends with fellow program alumni Ken Kesey (through their mutual friendships with Wendell Berry), Gurney Norman, and Robert Stone. As an active member of Kesey's band of Merry Pranksters, McClanahan introduced Stone to Kesey's circle. His memoir, Famous People I Have Known, humorously recollects many of his Prankster experiences, and Tom Wolfe's bestseller, The Electric Kool-Aid Acid Test, gave it worldwide notoriety.

In 1968, he signed the "Writers and Editors War Tax Protest" pledge, vowing to refuse tax payments in protest against the Vietnam War.

McClanahan served as a Jones Lecturer until 1972. He later taught at the University of Kentucky (deputizing for Wendell Berry during the 1972–1973 academic year), the University of Montana (1973–1976) and Northern Kentucky University (1979–1980) in a visiting lectureship that was to segue into a tenure-track position. Much to his surprise, he was released from his contract "at the last minute". He credited NKU and the sequence of events with giving him the opportunity to finish the long-gestating The Natural Man, which was completely rewritten from first to third person.

Following Kesey's death in 2001, McClanahan edited Spit in the Ocean #7: All About Kesey, a collection of stories, poems, and essays about Kesey. Spit in the Ocean #7 was the last volume of a literary magazine Kesey himself conceived in 1973 and thereafter sporadically self-published. Each Spit in the Ocean volume featured a different theme and editor; the last Kesey-published edition, Spit in the Ocean #6, had been released over 20 years before, in 1981.

McClanahan married Katherine Andrews in 1957 and they had three children: Jess, Kristin, and Caitlin. In 1975, he married Cia White (daughter of journalist and writer William S. White) and they had two children: Annie June and William. McClanahan resided in Lexington, Kentucky, with his third wife, Hilda. He had four grandchildren: Gray, Jessie, Rose, and Lucy. He was active in Kentucky literary circles and could occasionally be seen, in full "Captain Kentucky" regalia, guest-lecturing to University of Kentucky creative writing workshops. Horsefeathers: Stories from Room 241, an anthology of stories edited by McClanahan and Scotty Adkins compiled from a creative writing class taught by McClanahan at the University of Kentucky in 2009, was released by Wind Publications in 2011.

He died on November 27, 2021, at the age of 89.

== Writing ==
McClanahan was a writer since the mid-1950s with short stories, essays, and reviews in such magazines as Esquire, Playboy, and Rolling Stone. In 1972 and 1974, he received Playboy's award for nonfiction. He was known for his rollicking, good-naturedly crude humor and a creatively extensive vocabulary.

Along with contemporary authors Wendell Berry, James Baker Hall, Bobbie Ann Mason and fellow Prankster Gurney Norman, McClanahan was considered a member of the "Fab Five" group of Kentucky writers.

Initially conceived in 1961, The Natural Man was finally published in 1983 to great acclaim.

== Publications ==
- One Lord, One Faith, One Cornbread, Fred Nelson & Ed McClanahan (eds.) (Garden City, NY: Anchor Books), 1975. ISBN 978-0-385-04220-8
- The Natural Man (New York: Farrar, Straus, Giroux), 1983. ISBN 978-0-374-21969-7
- Famous People I Have Known (New York: Farrar, Straus, Giroux), 1985. ISBN 978-0-374-15329-8
- A Congress of Wonders (Washington, DC: Counterpoint), 1996. ISBN 978-1-887178-12-9
- My Vita, If You Will: The Uncollected Ed McClanahan (Washington, DC: Counterpoint), 1998. ISBN 978-1-887178-77-8
- Fondelle, or, The Whore with a Heart of Gold: A Report from the Field (Monterey, KY: Larkspur Press), 2002.
- A Foreign Correspondence (Tucson: Sylph Publications), 2002. ISBN 978-0-9673004-4-3
- Spit in the Ocean #7: All About Ken Kesey (New York: Penguin Books), 2003. ISBN 978-0-14-200363-3
- O The Clear Moment (Berkeley, CA: Counterpoint), 2008. ISBN 978-1-58243-430-8
- Not Even Immortality Lasts Forever: Mostly True Stories (Berkeley, CA: Counterpoint), 2020. ISBN 978-1-64-009260-0
