= Demon Box =

Demon Box may refer to:

- Demon Box (album), by Motorpsycho, 1993
- Demon Box (book), by Ken Kesey, 1986
