= Kesey's Garage Sale =

1973 collection of essays by Ken Kesey

- First edition
- Author: Ken Kesey
- Language: English
- Publisher: Viking Press
- Publication date: August 27, 1973
- Publication place: United States
- Media type: Print (Hardback and Paperback)
- Pages: 238 pp
- ISBN: 9780670412686
- OCLC: 561890014
- Dewey Decimal: 818.5407
- LC Class: PS3561.E667

Kesey's Garage Sale is a collection of essays and other writings by Ken Kesey, published in 1973. The book features the play "Over the Border" which is based on the time Kesey spent hiding in Mexico from drug charges in the United States. It is illustrated by the cartoonist and Merry Prankster Paul Foster, and also includes contributions from Paul Krassner, Neal Cassady, Allen Ginsberg, Hugh Romney and Arthur Miller. Much of the material had previously appeared elsewhere.

An anonymous reviewer in American Humor writes that it contains "intriguing nuggets of wisdom" on Kesey's views.
