= Sailor Song (novel) =

1992 novel by Ken Kesey

- First edition
- Author: Ken Kesey
- Cover artist: Russell Farrell
- Language: English
- Publisher: Viking Press
- Publication date: 1992
- Publication place: United States
- Pages: 533
- ISBN: 9780670835218
- OCLC: 25411564
- Dewey Decimal: 813.54
- LC Class: PS3561.E667

Sailor Song is a 1992 novel written by Ken Kesey. The only work of long fiction solely written by Kesey after Sometimes a Great Notion (1964), Sailor Song depicts the lives of the residents of Kuinak, a small town in Alaska, in the then future of the 2020s.

== Summary ==
Sailor Song is set in the near future in Kuinak, a small fishing town in Alaska. Earth is facing changes in climate and people are now living with the consequences of their environmentally destructive past. Kuinak is one of the last places on Earth that has not yet been impacted and that has managed to keep its natural beauty. The inhabitants live happily, undisturbed by the rest of the world and set in their ways. Among them lives Isaak "Ike" Sallas, the protagonist of the novel. A former eco-terrorist known as "the Bakatcha bandit," Sallas had developed a drug habit and had spent some time in jail. Now in Kuinak, Sallas lives as a simple fisherman, avoiding most people and trying to escape his past. Together with his rasta-influenced friend Emil Greer, Sallas is employed by British shipowner Michael Carmody and Carmody's wife Alice, a Kuinak native.

Life in Kuinak is soon disrupted by the arrival of Foxcorp executive Nick Levertov and his filming company, who come to film a story about a native girl. The company hopes to involve all the townspeople, and eventually to transform Kuinak into an amusement park. Levertov is the son of Alice Carmody and he has a special interest in Sallas. The two men were cellmates in prison, and Levertov is now seeking revenge against Sallas. Some of the townspeople are easily persuaded by Levertov's promises of quick and easy riches, but Sallas and others are not so easily convinced. Ultimately the question is decided by nature itself as a huge electromagnetic storm arrives and destroys all electronic devices.

== Reviews ==
Christopher Lehmann-Haupt wrote:

In 'Sailor Song' we are back with themes – the conflict between civilization and nature, the white man's marauding of the North American continent's natives – that preoccupied Mr. Kesey in his first two novels... though 'Sailor Song' has considerable strength and originality, it is by no means the new form of fiction that some readers were led to expect by the vector of his early fiction and by the nearly three decades it has taken to produce this book... What Mr. Kesey is up to here is often not very subtle... the story is narrated in a comically exaggerated style, full of ridiculous plays on words, that lends the book the reality of an animated cartoon... At the same time, there are many passages in 'Sailor Song' that are powerfully affecting... it is good to have him writing fiction again. He is a novelist of unusual force.

— Christopher Lehmann-Haupt, New York Times, Sept. 17, 1992

Charles Perry of the Los Angeles Times described the book as "a page-turner", and said "Sailor Song is a wild, rollicking novel, a dark and cosmic romp... This epic tale of the north is a vibrant moral fable for our time." Professor Marvin Gilbert Porter of the University of Missouri said "This novel has energy and exuberance aplenty: wild chase scenes, puns, name games, vaudevillian high jinks, songs, poems, playful literary allusions, zippy satire, and born-again patriotic Fourth of July fireworks." Publishers Weekly opined "His baroque humor in top form, Kesey skewers religious cults, organized lodges and land developers as the madcap adventures culminate in the phantasmogorical conclusion on the open seas... This is a gargantuan novel of epic dimensions that feeds on the need for love and heroes...". On the other hand, in The Independent, Christopher Bray wrote "Swollen and meandering, the book is short on narrative thrust. It has... patches of Shakespearian rhetorical intensity, and some great gags (some hideous ones too)... whereas One Flew Over the Cuckoo's Nest, Kesey's most celebrated novel, had memorable images... Sailor Song has little of such durability."
