= Twister (play) =

1999 play by Ken Kesey

Twister: A Ritual Reality in Three Quarters Plus Overtime if Necessary
- Written by: Ken Kesey, Ken Babbs

Premiere
- Date: May 26, 1994
- Place: Fillmore West Resurrection, San Francisco, CA, US

Twister: A Ritual Reality in Three Quarters Plus Overtime if Necessary, is a 1994 play by Ken Kesey, loosely based on L. Frank Baum's 1900 novel, The Wonderful Wizard of Oz and the 1939 film version, The Wizard of Oz. The play also features the West African deity Legba.

Kesey starred as the Wizard of Oz in the premiere of the play with Ken Babbs (as "Frankie Frankenstein") and other Merry Pranksters. A video of this production was released in 2000 by Key-Z Productions titled Twister: A Musical Catastrophe.
