= Chuck Kesey =

American food businessman (1938–2025)

Joe Houston "Chuck" Kesey (June 18, 1938 – November 6, 2025) was an American food businessman, and one of the Merry Pranksters. He was the founder of Springfield Creamery, the maker of Nancy's Yogurt, that billed itself as the first commercial entity to sell yogurt containing the Acidophilus probiotic. The New York Times said the introduction of probiotics into food was a "landmark in the natural foods movement". Forbes said he "helped start a cultural revolution" in cultured food.

In summer 1964, Kesey joined his brother Ken Kesey, and a troop of cohorts known as the Merry Pranksters, on a lengthy cross-country road trip in a converted school bus called Further, during which they engaged in "acid tests" (LSD). Tom Wolfe wrote an account of the "trip" in The Electric Kool-Aid Acid Test (1969), saying that "Chuck is one of the nicest people in the world.. a bright quiet man". In 1972, when his dairy business was struggling, his brother Ken arranged a benefit concert by the Grateful Dead at Chuck's Springfield Creamery.

Kesey died on November 6, 2025, at the age of 87.
