= Acid Tests =

LSD experiments/parties in the 1960s

- Part of the Hippie movement
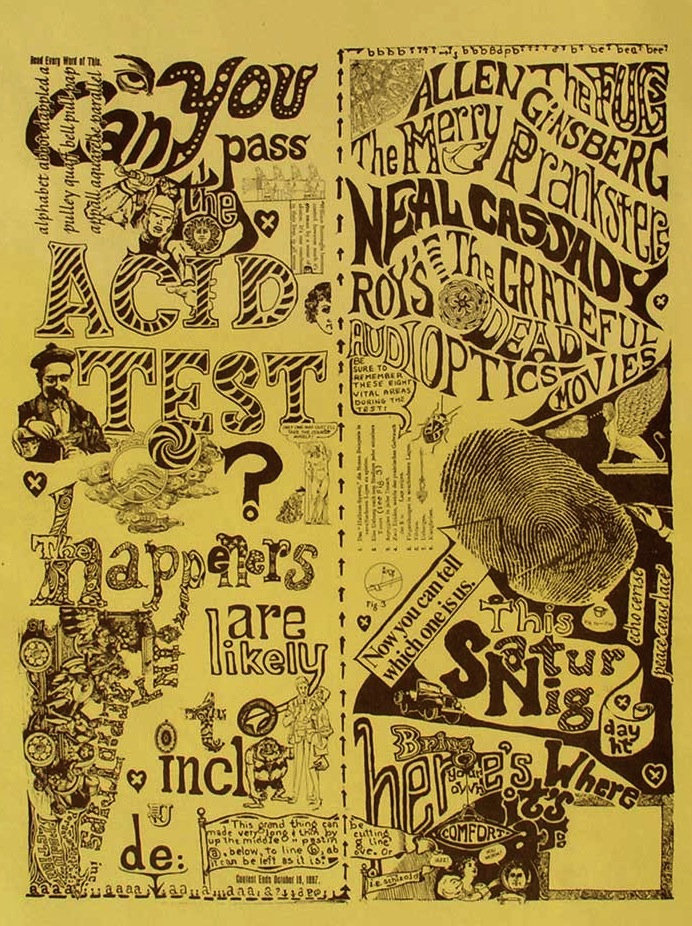
- An Acid Test handbill
- Date: 1965–1966
- Location: California, Texas

The Acid Tests were a series of parties held by author Ken Kesey primarily in the San Francisco Bay Area during the mid-1960s, centered on the use of and advocacy for the psychedelic drug LSD, commonly known as "acid". LSD was not made illegal in California until October 6, 1966, by the State Legislature during Governor Pat Brown's administration.

== History ==
The name "Acid Test" was coined by Kesey, after the term "acid test" used by gold miners in the 1850s. He began throwing parties at his home at La Honda, California. The Merry Pranksters were central to organizing the Acid Tests, including Pranksters such as Lee Quarnstrom and Neal Cassady. Other people, such as LSD chemists Owsley Stanley and Tim Scully, were also involved.

Kesey took the parties to public places, and advertised with posters that read, "Can you pass the acid test?", and the name was later popularized in Tom Wolfe's 1968 book The Electric Kool-Aid Acid Test. Musical performances by the Grateful Dead were commonplace, along with black lights, strobe lights, and fluorescent paint. The Acid Tests are notable for their influence on the LSD-based counterculture of the San Francisco area and subsequent transition from the beat generation to the hippie movement. The Jefferson Airplane song "A Song for All Seasons" (from Volunteers) mentions the Acid Tests.

== Timeline ==
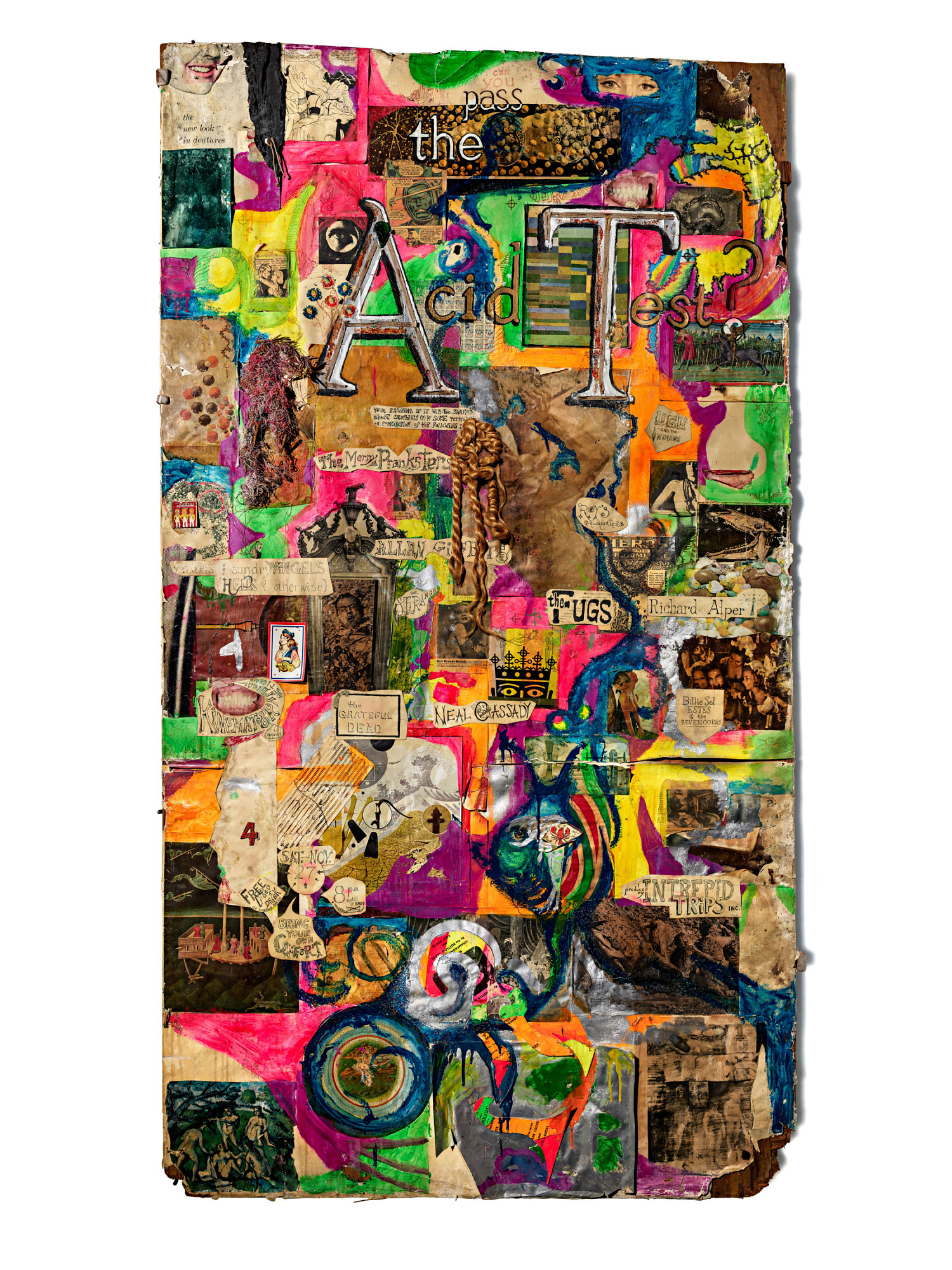
Sign for the Acid Test on November 27, 1965, by Ken Kesey, from the National Museum of American History, collection item #1992.0413.01

1965

- November 27; Soquel, California: The first Acid Test was a party at Ken Babbs' house on November 27, 1965; however, Babbs recalls it as being on Halloween night. A flyer allegedly shows that the Warlocks (one week before the band became known as the Grateful Dead) played at Soquel as the Warlocks on November 27. However, the authenticity of this flyer has been questioned. Several witnesses confirm that the Warlocks did not play a set at Soquel; they only casually played some of the Merry Prankster instruments. An original fluorescent paint and newsprint-collage Acid Test sign donated to the Smithsonian's National Museum of American History by event co-organizer Ken Kesey in 1992 lists The Grateful Dead as a musical performer, as well as The Fugs, alongside hand-drawn text on the sign reads: "Your essaying of it will be shared almost certainly (?) by some permutation or combination of the following [...]." In his book, Phil Lesh confirms that he did attend: "We were at the first Test not to play, but just to feel it out, and we hadn't brought any instruments or gear." Most likely Lesh was joined by Bob Weir and Jerry Garcia at the party.
- December 4; San Jose, California: This time, the newly renamed Grateful Dead did play, the first performance of their long career.
- December 11; Muir Beach, California
- December 18; Palo Alto, California

1966

- January 8; San Francisco, California (Fillmore)
- January 15; Portland, Oregon
- January 21–23; San Francisco (Trips Festival at Longshoreman's Hall)
- January 29 San Francisco, California (Sound City Studios)
- February 5; Los Angeles, California - Sepulveda Unitarian Universalist Society
- February 12; Watts, Los Angeles – Youth Opportunities Center
- February 25; Los Angeles, California (Hollywood) – Cinema Theatre
- March 12; Los Angeles, California (Danish Center)
- March 19; Los Angeles, California (Pico) Carthay Studios
- March 25; Los Angeles, California (Sunset Strip) – Troupers Club
- September 30 – October 2; San Francisco State College – Whatever It Is Festival – three days
- October 31; San Francisco, California — Acid Test Graduation (Bill Graham cancelled Winterland Ballroom event, Grateful Dead played at the California Hall (San Francisco, California) that night, and the event was held at a 69 Harriet St. SoMa warehouse.)

1967

- March 16; Houston, Texas (Brown College, Rice University) (despite the "graduation" concept of the final West Coast Acid Test, the actual final Acid Test of The Merry Pranksters was organized in Texas by Kesey's friend Larry McMurtry)

1968

- October 24; Congress passes the Staggers–Dodd Bill, criminalizing the recreational use of LSD-25

== Trips Festival ==
Trips Festival
- Genre: psychedelic
- Dates: January 21, 22 and 23
- Location: Longshoreman's Hall in San Francisco
- Years active: 1966
- Founders: Ramon Sender, Ken Kesey, Stewart Brand

Ramon Sender co-produced the Trips Festival with Ken Kesey and Stewart Brand. It was a three-day event that, in conjunction with The Merry Pranksters, brought together the nascent hippie movement. The Trips Festival was held at the Longshoreman's Hall in San Francisco in January 1966. Counterculture sound engineer Ken Babbs is mostly credited for the sound systems he created for the Trips Festival. Prior to Babbs' creation, it was discovered that particular music usually sounded distorted when cranked to high levels because of the cement floor on the San Francisco Longshoreman's Union Hall (where the Trips Festival was taking place). Babbs being a sound engineer resolved the problem. He made sound amplifiers that would not create distorted sounds when turned up to high sound levels.

Organized by Stewart Brand, Ken Kesey, Owsley Stanley, Zach Stewart and others, ten thousand people attended this sold-out event, with a thousand more turned away each night. On Saturday January 22, the Grateful Dead and Big Brother and the Holding Company came on stage. Further, 6,000 people arrived to drink punch spiked with LSD and to witness one of the first fully developed light shows of the era.

Big Brother and the Holding Company was formed at the Trips Festival. In the audience was painter and jazz drummer David Getz, who soon joined the band.

== See also ==
- List of historic rock festivals

== Sources ==
- Wolfe, Tom (1968). The Electric Kool-Aid Acid Test.
- Lesh, Phil. "The Acid Test Chronicles - Page 16 - Portland Oregon - 6th Acid Test - Jan. 15, 1966". Acid Test Chronicles. Archived from the original on April 25, 2012.
