= Paul Foster (cartoonist) =

American cartoonist (1934–2003)

Paul M. Foster (November 7, 1934 – June 23, 2003) was a Merry Prankster best known for illustrating the book Kesey's Garage Sale. He was a founding member of Wavy Gravy's Hog Farm commune.

Foster was a mathematical genius and became a computer programmer "in the days of wooden transistors" as he would say. He was programming in binary code since 1954, when computers were as big as a room. In 1964 he sponsored a music club in San Jose, The Offstage. He hired the future members of the Grateful Dead and Jefferson Airplane, Paul Kantner, Jorma Kaukonen, Jerry Garcia, Odetta, Jessie Fuller. He also liked to draw and created handbills for the music events, some of the first artworks that would become the music poster scene of the 60s.

Through the musicians, Paul met Neal Cassady and then Ken Kesey. He gave up computing to join Kesey and the Pranksters, living in a tree house in La Honda. He was the artist who drew the Acid Test Posters, as well as the Acid Test diploma. The Acid Test Poster has been attributed Norman Hartweg, but this itself is a prank.

When the Acid Tests ended, Foster went to India overland with several companions. When he returned, he looked up Hugh Romney, a.k.a. Wavy Gravy, and was invited to take care of a pig farm outside Sunland Tujunga in Los Angeles; this was the beginning of the Hog Farm commune. In 1968, the Hog Farm painted their own bus, the Road Hog, and took a caravan with a light show, geodesic dome, and a band on a trip across America promoting happenings. In the summer of 1969, the Hog Farm was asked to help with security and a free kitchen for Woodstock. Foster made signs before the event and helped in the freak out tent. After further travels with the Hog Farm, Foster went to Eugene, Oregon where he worked with Ken Kesey and Ken Babbs to produce the book Kesey's Garage Sale.

Foster eventually returned to programming and to Cupertino in the heart of Silicon Valley. He worked for NASA as well as Apple Computers before retiring to live near his daughter in Northern California. He self-published the book, The Answer is Always Yes and always kept a journal of drawings and clever sayings. He died unexpectedly of a heart attack in 2003 after filling in the last page of his journal, suggesting that we forget the Alamo and seek love.
