= Magic Trip =

2011 American documentary film

- Promotional release poster
- Directed by: Alex Gibney; Alison Ellwood
- Produced by: Alex Gibney; Gareth Wiley
- Starring: Ken Kesey; Neal Cassady; The Grateful Dead; Jack Kerouac; Allen Ginsberg; The Merry Band of Pranksters; Larry McMurtry; Ken Babbs; Timothy Leary
- Narrated by: Stanley Tucci
- Edited by: Alison Ellwood; Lindy Jankura
- Music by: David Kahne
- Production company: History Channel Films
- Distributed by: Magnolia Pictures
- Release date: August 5, 2011
- Running time: 90 minutes
- Country: United States
- Language: English
- Box office: $155,005

Magic Trip, also known as Magic Trip: Ken Kesey's Search for a Kool Place, is a 2011 American documentary film directed by Alison Ellwood and Alex Gibney, about Ken Kesey, Neal Cassady, and the Merry Pranksters with Robert Stone, Jack Kerouac and Allen Ginsberg.

== Production ==
The documentary uses the 16 mm color footage shot with Arriflex 16M by Kesey and the Merry Pranksters during their 1964 cross-country bus trip in the Furthur bus (destination sign: "FURTHER"). The hyperkinetic Cassady is seen driving the bus from California to New York, jabbering and sitting next to a sign that boasts, "Neal gets things done".

Kesey had spent 40 years attempting to edit the film footage before he abandoned the attempt.

Gibney says: "They didn't really know how to use the equipment properly, or why you had to do certain things. They shot over 40 hours of footage but by the time we got hold of it, it had been badly clawed over and was in a mess. The quality of the camerawork was pretty bad. And they recorded the sound at different speeds, without a clapperboard, so there was no way to synch it with the images. We even hired a lip-reader at one stage."

Gibney and "his longtime editor" Ellwood were given full access to source material by the Kesey estate, and worked with the Film Foundation, HISTORY, and UCLA Archives, to construct this edit using the audio commentary that the participants (Merry Pranksters§On the bus) recorded while viewing the raw footage.

Gibney and Ellwood also interject clips, from an "LSD-peril" TV episode of Dragnet, the film One Flew Over the Cuckoo's Nest, and music, silly, "Love Potion No. 9" and "trippy", "Timothy's Leary's Dead".

The Pranksters...were never proto-hippies: They were post-Beatniks, with a far greater affinity for the intellectual adventurism of the late '50s than the free-love ethos of the late '60s

Indeed, there is a lot about the bus ride that really isn't anything more profound than a frat house road trip. (And, because of that, the police didn't seem to mind: they couldn't even imagine the idea of LSD and never thought to arrest Cassady even though he didn't have a valid driver's license.)

== Release ==
Magic Trip was released in the United States on August 5, 2011, by Magnolia Pictures. The film's soundtrack includes excerpts from several songs by the Grateful Dead.

== Reception ==
On the review aggregator website Rotten Tomatoes, 72% of 60 critics' reviews are positive, with an average rating of 6.3/10. The website's consensus reads: "Magic Trip is overall unenlightening, though there's an inherent novelty and joy in seeing the unearthed footage of Ken Kesey and his band of Merry Pranksters." Metacritic, which uses a weighted average, assigned the film a score of 59 out of 100, based on 20 critics, indicating "mixed or average" reviews.

In The New York Times, critic Stephen Holden wrote:

This distillation of home movies shot by the author Ken Kesey and his friends, known as the Merry Pranksters, chronicles their acid-fueled cross-country bus trip in 1964 from California to New York to visit the World's Fair. Thanks partly to Tom Wolfe's raised-eyebrow account, The Electric Kool-Aid Acid Test, that bohemian lark has been retrospectively hailed as the flash point of the emerging hippie counterculture...

The film begins with a biography of Kesey, a glamorous, blondish roughneck writer known for his novels One Flew Over the Cuckoo's Nest and Sometimes a Great Notion. His college dreams of being an Olympic wrestler ended with a serious shoulder injury. The documentary includes a history of LSD and a re-creation of Kesey's participation in a 1959 government study in which his moment-by-moment remarks after taking LSD were tape-recorded. (We hear his voice over a faked re-enactment.) The cheesy visual effects accompanying the sequence are meager compared with the full-blown psychedelia in Julie Taymor's movie Across the Universe.

== See also ==
- List of psychedelic documentaries
