= Richard Scowcroft =

American novelist

Richard Scowcroft (June 26, 1916 – October 8, 2001) was an American writer and teacher of writers long associated with Stanford University, where he co-founded the creative-writing program with, and ultimately succeeded, Wallace Stegner as director. Among the writers taught were Tillie Olsen, Wendell Berry, Robert Stone, Larry McMurtry, Karen Rosenbaum, Ed McClanahan, Ken Kesey, Scott Turow and Chuck Kinder. Scowcroft's work frequently featured themes based in his Mormon upbringing.

== Novels ==
- Children of the Covenant (1945)
- First Family (1950)
- A View of the Bay (1955)
- Wherever She Goes (1966)
- The Ordeal of Dudley Dean (1969)
- Back to Fire Mountain (1973)
