= Merry Pranksters =

Followers of Ken Kesey

The Merry Pranksters were followers of American author Ken Kesey. Kesey and the Merry Pranksters lived communally at Kesey's homes in California and Oregon, and are noted for the sociological significance of a lengthy road trip they took in the summer of 1964, traveling across the United States in a psychedelic painted school bus called Furthur, organizing parties, and giving out LSD. During this time they met many of the guiding lights of the 1960s cultural movement and heralded what are commonly thought of as hippies with tie-dyed and red, white, and blue clothing, and renunciation of mainstream society, which they dubbed The Establishment. Tom Wolfe chronicled their early escapades in his 1968 book The Electric Kool-Aid Acid Test, including a bit on the same epic 1964 cross-country trip on Furthur - a sojourn to the 1964 World's Fair in New York City, stopping to visit Kesey's friend, novelist Larry McMurtry in Houston on the way.

Notable members of the group include Kesey's best friend Ken Babbs, Carolyn "Mountain Girl" Garcia, Lee Quarnstrom, and Neal Cassady. Stewart Brand, Dorothy Fadiman, Paul Foster, George Walker, the Warlocks (later known as the Grateful Dead), Del Close (then a lighting designer for the Grateful Dead), Wavy Gravy, Paul Krassner, and Kentucky Fab Five writers Ed McClanahan and Gurney Norman (who overlapped with Kesey and Babbs as creative writing graduate students at Stanford University) were associated with the group to varying degrees.

These events are also documented by one of the original pranksters, Lee Quarnstrom, in his 2014 memoir, When I Was a Dynamiter.

== Origin of name ==
In an interview on BBC World Service in August 2014, Ken Babbs suggested that the name "The Merry Pranksters" was his idea:

Kesey and George Walker and I were out wandering around and the rest of the gang were sitting around a fire in Kesey's house in La Honda, and when we came back it was dark and Mike Hagen called out "Halt! Who goes there?" And just out of the blue I said, "'Tis I, the intrepid traveller, come to lead his merry band of pranksters across the nation, in the reverse order of the pioneers! And our motto will be 'the obliteration of the entire nation' ... not taken literally of course, we won't blow up their buildings, we'll blow their minds!"

== Membership ==
=== On the bus ===
Although a great many friends and associates spent time with Kesey at his La Honda, California ranch in the Santa Cruz Mountains south of San Francisco, the core group of 14 people who became the 'Merry Band of Pranksters' that drove across the country in 1964 were:

- Ken Kesey (The Chief, Captain Flag, or Swashbuckler), author (1935–2001)
- Neal Cassady (Sir Speed Limit), driver (eastbound), author (1926–1968)
- Cathy Casamo (Stark Naked), actress, girlfriend of Larry Hankin (1938–1992)
- Ron Bevirt (Hassler), photographer (1939–)
- Ken Babbs (Intrepid Traveler), author, boyfriend of Paula Sundsten (1936–)
- John Babbs (Sometimes Missing), Ken Babbs' older brother (1937–2012)
- Jane Burton (Generally Famished), Stanford philosophy professor, pregnant at the time
- Sandy Lehmann-Haupt (Dis-Mount), sound engineer, younger brother of Carl Lehmann-Haupt (1942–2001)
- Paula Sundsten (Gretchen Fetchin or Slime Queen), girlfriend of Ken Babbs
- Mike Hagen (Mal Function), cameraman
- George Walker (Hardly Visible)(1939–)
- Steve Lambrecht (Zonker), businessman (1942–1998)
- Chuck Kesey (Brother Charlie), Ken's brother (1938–2025)
- Dale Kesey (Highly Charged), Ken's cousin, "bus chaplain"(1943–)
- Linda Breen (Anonymous), a 14 year old runaway who hopped on in Canada during the original trip

=== Off the bus ===
Other on-again, off-again Pranksters (all of whom did not participate in the first cross-country journey, but may have the later trips) include, but are not limited to, the following:

- Roy Sebern, artist (painted the name "Furthur" [sic] on the bus)
- Carolyn Adams Garcia (Mountain Girl), wife of Jerry Garcia and George Walker, mother of Ken Kesey's daughter Sunshine (1946–)
- Chloe Scott, dancer (1925–2019)
- John Page Browning (Zea-Lot or Cadaverous Cowboy), light show operator (1938–1984)
- Gordon "Dass" Adams, Mountain Girl's brother (1940–)
- Anthony Dean Wells (The Hermit)
- Denise Kaufman (Mary Microgram), musician with The Ace of Cups
- Ron Boise, sculptor (1931–1966)
- Paul Foster, cartoonist (1934–2003)
- Peter Demma, co-owner of Hip Pocket Bookstore with Kesey
- Norman Hartweg, columnist (1947–)
- Dorothy Fadiman, filmmaker (1939–)
- Kathy (Zonker's girlfriend) (aka Sensuous X)
- June (aka June the Goon)
- Stephanie Kesey (Lips)
- Zane Kesey (Chicken Leopard)
- Allan Terk (Gut) Oakland Hells Angel, Acid Test graduation poster artist, designed first Grateful Dead shirt (1939–2018)
- John Terrence Tracy (Terry The Tramp)- Oakland Hells Angel, Actor, La Honda alumni (1939–1970)
- Simon Babbs (Lightning)
- Margie Piaggio (Marge the Barge)
- Laurence Shurtliff (Ramrod) Lead Roadie for Grateful Dead (1945–2006)
- Matt Wade (Little Jack)- Oakland Hells Angels 'Dago Joe's' son, Author and Bus Mechanic
- Euphoria Foster (Marie) Paul's Daughter, artist
- Elaya Cassady (Firefly) Singer, Artist, daughter of The Fillmore light tech 'Teddy Bruce'
- Del Close, comedian and performance coach (1934–1999)
- Stewart Brand, author and futurist (1938–)
- Wavy Gravy, entertainer and activist (1936–)
- Paul Krassner, author (1932–2019)
- Lee Quarnstrom, author (1939–2021)
- Ed McClanahan (Captain Kentucky), author (1932–2021)
- Gurney Norman, author (1937–)
- Robert Stone, author; met the bus in New York City (1937–2015)
- Emilia Hazelip, organic gardener (1937–2003)

== Eastward bus journey ==
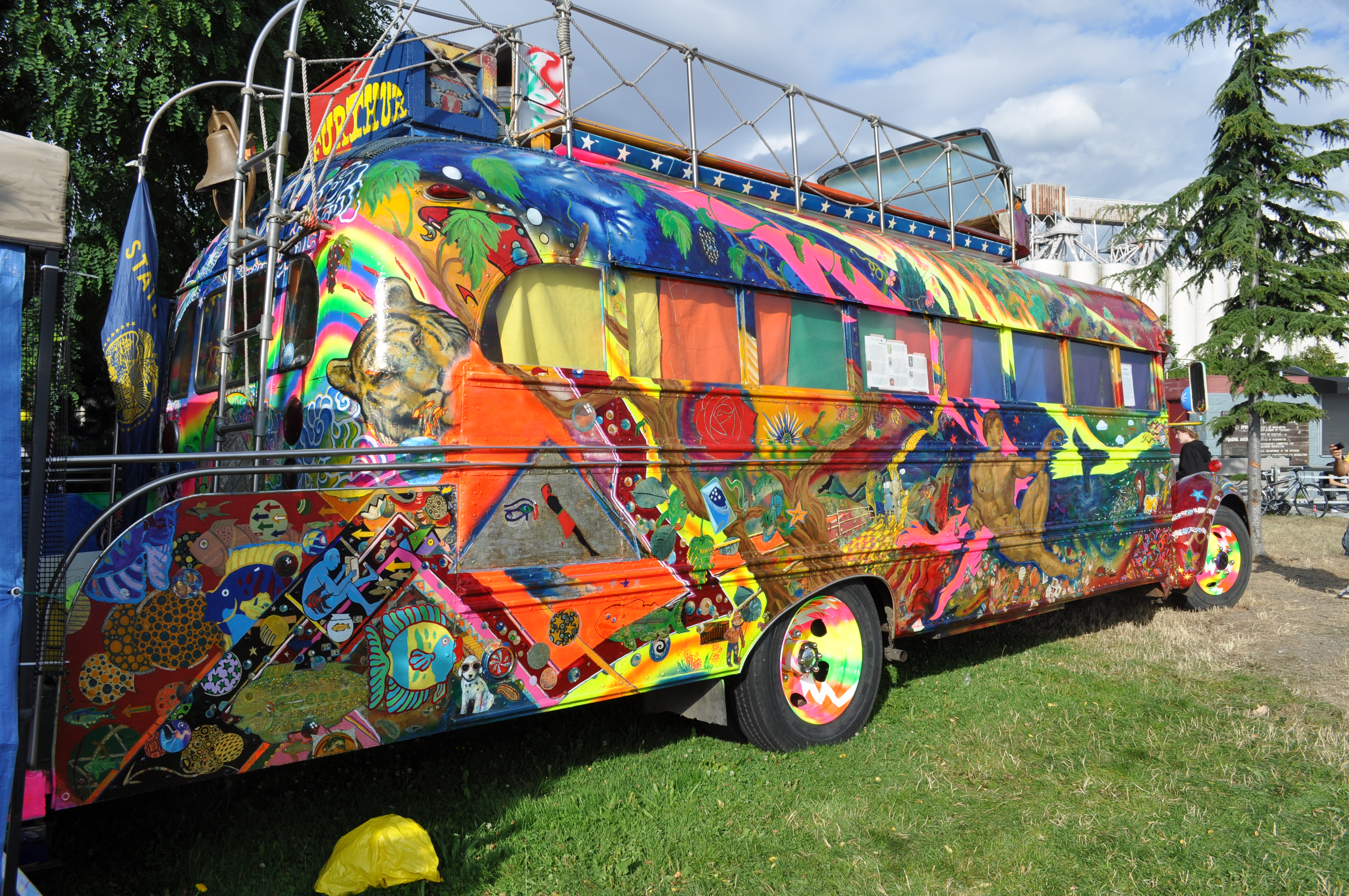
Furthur, Ken Kesey and the Merry Pranksters' second bus

On June 17, 1964, Kesey and 13 Merry Pranksters boarded Furthur at Kesey's ranch in La Honda, California, and set off eastward. Kesey wanted to see what would happen when hallucinogenic-inspired spontaneity confronted what he saw as the banality and conformity of American society. Ken Babbs has suggested that the bus trip reversed the historic American westward movement.

The trip's original purpose was to celebrate the publication of Kesey's novel Sometimes a Great Notion (1964) and to visit the 1964 World's Fair in New York City. The Pranksters were enthusiastic users of marijuana, amphetamines, and LSD, and in the process of their journey are said to have "turned on" many people by introducing them to these drugs.

The psychedelically painted bus's stated destination — "furthur" — was the Merry Pranksters' goal: a destination that could be reached only through the expansion of one's own perception of reality.

Novelist Robert Stone, who met the bus on its arrival in New York, wrote in his memoir Prime Green: Remembering the Sixties (2007) that those accompanying Kesey on the trip were Neal Cassady (described by Stone as "the world's greatest driver, who could roll a joint while backing a 1937 Packard onto the lip of the Grand Canyon"), Ken Babbs ("fresh from the Nam, full of radio nomenclature, and with a command voice that put cops to flight"), Jane Burton ("a pregnant young philosophy professor who declined no challenges"), George Walker, Sandy Lehmann-Haupt (dis-MOUNT), Mike Hagen (Mal Function), Ron Bevirt (Hassler), Chuck Kesey, Dale Kesey, John Babbs, Steve Lambrecht and Paula Sundstren (aka Gretchin Fetchin, Slime Queen).

Zane Kesey and Simon Babbs edited the video and audio clips made by the Pranksters on the trip to produce a DVD (1999) called simply The Acid Test, which is distributed by Key-z Productions.

== Hells Angels ==
Kesey and the Pranksters also had a relationship with the outlaw motorcycle gang the Hells Angels, whom Kesey introduced to LSD. The details of their relationship are documented in Wolfe's above-mentioned book, in Hunter S. Thompson's book, Hell's Angels: The Strange and Terrible Saga of the Outlaw Motorcycle Gangs (1966), and in Allen Ginsberg's poem about the Kesey/Angels relationship, titled "First Party at Ken Kesey's with Hell's Angels" (December 1965).

== Later events ==
In 1969, Furthur and the Pranksters (minus Kesey) attended the Woodstock rock festival. In the same year, they attended the Texas Pop Festival at Lewisville, Texas.

Kesey's Demon Box (1986), a collection of short pieces, several about the Merry Pranksters, was a critical success. A subsequent novel, Sailor Song (1992), was not, with critics complaining it was too spacey for comprehension. In 1994, Kesey toured with the Pranksters, performing Twister: A Ritual Reality in Three Quarters Plus Overtime if Necessary, a play he wrote in 1989 about the millennium, influenced by L. Frank Baum's Wizard of Oz works.

The Merry Pranksters filmed and audiotaped much of what they did on their bus trips. Some of this material has surfaced in documentaries, including the BBC's Dancing In the Street. Some Pranksters have released footage on their own, and a version of the film edited by Kesey is available through his son Zane's website. On August 14, 1997, Kesey appeared with the Merry Pranksters at a Phish concert during a performance of the song "Colonel Forbin's Ascent" from the album The Man Who Stepped Into Yesterday (1987). Kesey and the Pranksters also helped stage The Enit Festival, held at the Bill Graham Civic Auditorium on November 22, 1997, with Jane's Addiction, Funky Tekno Tribe, Goldie, and Res Fest rounding out the bill.

The original Prankster bus is at Kesey's farm in Oregon. In November 2005, it was pulled out of the swamp by Zane Kesey and family and a group of the original Merry Pranksters with the intent of restoring it. The Smithsonian Institution sought to acquire the bus, which is no longer operable, but Kesey refused, and attempted, unsuccessfully, to prank the Smithsonian by passing off a phony bus.

Kesey died of complications due to liver cancer in November 2001.

On December 10, 2003, Ken Babbs hosted a memorial to Kesey with String Cheese Incident and various other old and new Pranksters. It was held at the McDonald Theatre in Eugene, Oregon. The proceeds helped to raise money for the Ken Kesey Memorial sculpture designed by Peter Helzer. The bronze sculpture depicted a life-size Kesey reading to three children while seated on a curved granite bench covered with quotations from Kesey's novels One Flew Over the Cuckoo's Nest (1962) and Sometimes a Great Notion (1964). (Pulitzer Prize-winning photographer Brian Lanker supplied the image.) Other benefactors for the project include Bob Weir, Paul Newman (who starred in the 1971 film adaptation of Sometimes a Great Notion) and Michael Douglas (who produced the 1975 film version of One Flew Over the Cuckoo's Nest).

== 2011 documentary ==
Alex Gibney and Alison Ellwood directed a documentary film Magic Trip (2011) about the Merry Pranksters, which was released on August 5, 2011.

== 50th Anniversary Trip ==
In April 2014, Ken's son Zane Kesey, along with friend Derek Stevens, announced a Kickstarter to fund a 50th anniversary bus trip offering donors a chance to ride Furthur. The fundraiser was successful, and the trip took place between June and September 2014. Over 100 participants were invited to ride on legs of the trip after making donations. The 2014 journey covered over 15,000 miles, held 53 different events in 29 different states, and spent 75 days on the road. A group of filmmakers documented the journey, releasing a film titled Going Furthur.
