= Last Go Round =

1994 novel by Ken Kesey and Ken Babbs

- First edition
- Author: Ken Kesey and Ken Babbs
- Language: English
- Genre: Western
- Publisher: Viking Press
- Publication date: 1994
- Publication place: United States
- Pages: 238
- ISBN: 9780670848836
- OCLC: 28548975
- Dewey Decimal: 813.54
- LC Class: PS3561.E667

Last Go Round is a 1994 novel written by Ken Kesey and Ken Babbs. It was Kesey's last novel and is about the famous "Last Go Round" that took place at the original Pendleton Round-Up in 1911. The book contains references to real historical figures, and was published with photographs from the early days of the Pendleton rodeo. However, the story is written as a tall tale, with characters and feats that are larger than life.
