= Carolyn Garcia =

Merry Prankster and former wife of Jerry Garcia (born 1946)

- Born: Carolyn Elizabeth Adams; May 7, 1946 (age 80); Poughkeepsie, New York, U.S.
- Other name: Mountain Girl
- Spouse(s): George Walker (1966–1978); Jerry Garcia (1981–1994)
- Partner: Ken Kesey (1964–1966)
- Children: 3

Carolyn Elizabeth Garcia (née Adams; born May 7, 1946), also known as "Mountain Girl", is an American Merry Prankster and the former wife of Jerry Garcia, the lead vocalist and guitar player of the band Grateful Dead.

== Biography ==
Carolyn Elizabeth Adams was born on May 6, 1946 in Poughkeepsie, New York. She attended Franklin Delano Roosevelt High School in Hyde Park. Shortly after she was expelled from high school, she traveled to Palo Alto, California in 1963 with her older brother Don. She got a job at Stanford University, working for Carl Djerassi in the organic chemistry lab, analyzing psychiatric drugs, and she was fired for "dipping into the experimental psychedelic chemicals which she was analyzing."

In early 1964, she met Neal Cassady, who introduced her to Ken Kesey and his friends, one of whom gave her the name "Mountain Girl" because she was a "little bit wild." Journalist Tom Wolfe described his first impression of a teenage Adams as "a tall girl, big and beautiful with dark brown hair falling down to her shoulders except that the lower two-thirds of her falling hair looks like a paintbrush dipped in cadmium yellow from where she dyed it blond in Mexico."

Cassady took her to La Honda, California, Kesey's base of operations, where she quickly joined the inner circle of Pranksters and became romantically involved with Kesey, having a daughter by him named Sunshine. Kesey was arrested for marijuana possession in La Honda, in 1965 and fled to Mexico. He returned to the United States and, just nights after being sentenced to six months in the San Mateo County Jail, he was arrested again, this time with Adams, while smoking marijuana on the rooftop of Stewart Brand's home on Telegraph Hill, San Francisco.

She had a relationship with another Prankster named George Walker, who later became her husband in 1966. They separated in December 1966 and were divorced in 1978. After splitting with Walker, she began a relationship with Jerry Garcia, but they did not marry. While living together over the next decade, they raised Sunshine along with their two daughters. The family had a house in San Rafael, California as well as a beach house in Stinson Beach, California.

Garcia and Adams separated in 1975 after he began a relationship with filmmaker Deborah Koons. Although Garcia and Adams reconciled after the dissolution of his relationship with Koons in 1977, they stopped cohabiting a year later (save for occasional holiday reunions) due to the guitarist's addictions to heroin and cocaine.

After marrying "partly for tax purposes and partly out of a fond flickering of a once-bright romance" in late 1981, this arrangement persisted until Garcia entered a diabetic coma in 1986. While that led to a lengthy period of cohabitation in which Carolyn Garcia played an integral role in her husband's recovery, they gradually drifted apart once more when Garcia began an extramarital relationship and fathered a child with Manasha Matheson.

Jerry and Carolyn Garcia divorced in 1994 but remained friends until his death. During this period, he rekindled his relationship with Koons, who had been largely out of his life since the late 1970s; they would ultimately marry in February 1994. A month after the Grateful Dead's summer 1995 tour concluded, Garcia died at a rehabilitation facility in August 1995.

Following Jerry Garcia's death, Carolyn Garcia was involved in litigation to obtain payments as per their divorce settlement agreement, ultimately agreeing to a $1,250,000 settlement to avoid further legal costs.

Carolyn Garcia currently sits on the boards of the Rex Foundation and the Furthur Foundation, and she is on the advisory board of the Marijuana Policy Project. She formerly served on the board of the Women's Visionary Council. Garcia lives near her daughter, Annabelle Garcia, on the Kesey family farm southeast of Pleasant Hill, Oregon.

== Books ==
- Mountain Girl (1976). Primo Plant: Growing Sinsemilla Marijuana. Berkeley: Bookpeople. ISBN 9780915070046. OL 9661953W. Garcia's early book on marijuana growing.
  - Mountain Girl (1998). Primo Plant: Growing Marijuana Outdoors. Oakland: Quick American Archives. ISBN 0-932551-27-0. OL 9661953W. A reprint of the 1976 book.
