= Sometimes a Great Notion (film) =

1971 film by Paul Newman

- Theatrical release poster
- Directed by: Paul Newman
- Screenplay by: John Gay
- Based on: Sometimes a Great Notion by Ken Kesey
- Produced by: John Foreman
- Starring: Paul Newman; Henry Fonda; Lee Remick; Michael Sarrazin; Richard Jaeckel; Linda Lawson; Cliff Potts
- Cinematography: Richard Moore
- Edited by: Bob Wyman
- Music by: Henry Mancini
- Production company: Newman-Foreman Company
- Distributed by: Universal Pictures
- Release date: December 17, 1971
- Running time: 113 minutes
- Country: United States
- Language: English
- Box office: $4 million (US/ Canada rentals)

Sometimes a Great Notion (a.k.a. Never Give A Inch [sic] on some commercial television broadcasts) is a 1971 American drama film directed by Paul Newman and starring Newman, Henry Fonda, Michael Sarrazin and Lee Remick. The cast also includes Richard Jaeckel in an Academy Award-nominated performance.

The screenplay by John Gay is based on the 1964 novel of the same name by Ken Kesey, the first of his books to be adapted for the screen. Filmed in western Oregon during the summer of 1970, it was released over a year later in December 1971.

== Plot ==
The economic stability of fictional Wakonda, Oregon, is threatened when the local logging union calls a strike against a large lumber conglomerate. When independent logger Hank Stamper and his father Henry are urged to support the strikers, they refuse, and the townspeople consider them traitors. All of the Stampers live in one compound, including Henry's good-natured nephew Joe Ben.

Hank struggles to keep the small family business alive and consequently widens the rift between himself and his complacent wife Viv, who wants him to put an end to the territorial struggle but is resigned to his doing things as he sees fit. Also complicating matters is Leland "Lee" Stamper, Henry's youngest son and Hank's half-brother, who returns home with a college education and experience in urban living. A heavy drinker, Lee eventually reveals he attempted suicide after his mother killed herself and has been suffering from deep depression ever since. He urges the neglected Viv to leave.

Despite the fact that he is uncomfortable living with a family he barely knows, Lee joins forces with them when they are forced to battle both the locals, who have burned their equipment, and the elements, which threaten their efforts to transport their logs downriver. After aiding their adversaries when their lives are in peril, the Stampers are handed two calamities at once, a falling tree that severs Henry's arm, and a trunk that crushes Joe Ben in shallow water.

Lee takes his father to the hospital, while Joe Ben laughs at his own predicament until the tree trunk rolls atop him, pinning him down. Hank's desperate rescue attempts fail as the tide rises, drowning Joe Ben. At the hospital, Henry dies after finally expressing his approval of Lee, who informs Hank that Viv has left him. Hank returns to an empty home and appears for a while to have given up. Ultimately, he decides to deliver the logs, alone if necessary, but Lee joins him. Lining up along the riverbank, the Stampers' rivals look forward to seeing them fail, but the brothers are successful. Henry's severed arm is attached to the boat, giving the middle finger to all who watch.

== Cast ==
- Paul Newman as Hank Stamper
- Henry Fonda as Henry Stamper
- Lee Remick as Viv Stamper
- Michael Sarrazin as Leland Stamper
- Richard Jaeckel as Joe Ben Stamper
- Linda Lawson as Jan Stamper
- Cliff Potts as Andy Stamper
- Roy Jenson as Howie Elwood
- Joe Maross as Floyd Evenwrite
- Melissa Newman as Lissy Stamper (uncredited)

== Production ==
Although both Sam Peckinpah and Budd Boetticher had expressed interest in bringing Ken Kesey's novel to the screen, Richard A. Colla was signed to direct the film in May 1970. Five weeks after principal photography began, Colla left the project due to "artistic differences over photographic concept", as well as a required throat operation. At the same time, leading man Paul Newman broke his ankle, and the production shut down on July 29. As co-executive producer, Newman considered replacing Colla with George Roy Hill, who declined the offer, so when filming resumed two weeks later, Newman was directing as well as acting.

The fictional community of Wakonda was filmed in various locations in Lincoln County along the Oregon Coast. These included Kernville and other locations along the Siletz River, as well as Yaquina Bay, the Yaquina River, and the city of Newport, where several scenes were filmed in Mo's Shanty Fish House.

The film's theme song, "All His Children", with lyrics by Alan and Marilyn Bergman and music by Henry Mancini, is performed by Charley Pride.

== Critical reception ==
Vincent Canby of The New York Times called it "an extremely interesting, if impure (happily impure, I might add) example of a genre of action film that flourished in the 1930s in movies about tuna fishermen, bush pilots, high-wire repairmen and just about any physical pursuit you can think of . . . As in Howard Hawks's Only Angels Have Wings, these films are, at their best, considerably less simple-minded than they sound—being expressions of lives lived almost entirely in terms of rugged, essentially individualistic professionalism . . . Mr. Newman . . . has been remarkably successful both in creating vivid, quite complicated characters and in communicating the sense of beautiful idiocy that is the strength of the two older Stampers. As he showed in Rachel, Rachel, Mr. Newman knows how to direct actors . . . [His] handling of the logging and action sequences . . . is also surprisingly effective, not because of any contemporary fanciness but because of what looks like a straightforward confidence in the subject. My only real objection to the film, I think, is a certain impatience with the screenplay, which lumberingly sets up almost a very physical and emotional crisis that can (and, indeed, must) erupt before this kind of movie can be said to have decently met its obligations."

Roger Ebert of the Chicago Sun-Times rated the film three out of four stars and described Newman as "a director of sympathy and a sort of lyrical restraint. He rarely pushes scenes to their obvious conclusions, he avoids melodrama, and by the end of Sometimes a Great Notion, we somehow come to know the Stamper family better than we expected to."

On the review aggregator website Rotten Tomatoes, 100% of 14 critics' reviews are positive, with an average rating of 7.3/10.

== Awards and nominations ==
Award	Category	Nominee(s)	Result	Ref.
Academy Awards	Best Supporting Actor	Richard Jaeckel	Nominated	
Academy Awards	Best Song – Original for the Picture	"All His Children"; Music by Henry Mancini; Lyrics by Alan and Marilyn Bergman	Nominated	

== Home media ==
The film was one of the first two programs (after a New York Rangers–Vancouver Canucks NHL game) and the first movie presentation to be broadcast by Home Box Office (HBO) when the pay television network launched in Wilkes-Barre, Pennsylvania on November 8, 1972, airing less than two years after its initial theatrical release. When it was finally aired on commercial television in 1977, it was retitled Never Give a Inch [sic], a reference to the Stamper family philosophy.

On December 18, 2012, Shout! Factory released the film on Blu-ray for the first time.

== See also ==
- List of American films of 1971
