= Demon Box (book) =

1986 book by Ken Kesey

- Hardcover edition
- Author: Ken Kesey
- Language: English
- Genre: Fiction and non-fiction
- Publisher: Viking Press
- Publication date: 1986
- Publication place: United States
- Media type: Print
- ISBN: 9780140085303
- OCLC: 911911149
- Dewey Decimal: 813.54
- LC Class: PS3561.E667

Demon Box is a 1986 collection of works by Ken Kesey. The book includes nonfiction and fiction short stories as well as some of Kesey's essays.

== Background ==
Kesey explained why the collection of semi-autobiographical essays was titled Demon Box: "When Viking was bringing it out," he said, "they were desperate for something to call it. I told them, 'Don't call it anything .' It isn't a novel; it isn't an autobiography; it isn't journalism; I think of it as a box in which all this stuff goes." To his publisher, Kesey started calling the book a "box novel," a new form of literature. "If I were to think of it as a (traditional) novel, I would have joined it together and had a gradual progression of thematic movement and character change through it, but I didn't want to do that." Kesey also explained he considered the idea of publishing the essays in pamphlet form, then putting the pamphlets in a box and selling the box.

== Contents ==
- D Tank Kickout
- Joon the Goon was What
- Mother's Day 1969: Quiston's Report
- Tranny Man Over the Border
- Abdul & Ebenezer
- The Day After Superman Died
- The Search for the Secret Pyramid
- Killer
- Oleo: Demon Briefs and Dopey Ditties
- Finding Doctor Fung
- Run into Great Wall
- Little Tricker the Squirrel Meets Big Double the Bear - by Grandma Whittier
- Good Friday - by Grandma Whittier
- Now We Know How Many Holes It Takes to Fill the Albert Hall
- The Demon Box: An Essay
- Last Time the Angels Came Up
