= Neal Cassady =

American writer (1926–1968)

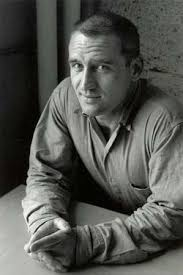
- Born: Neal Leon Cassady; February 8, 1926; Salt Lake City, Utah, U.S.
- Died: February 4, 1968 (aged 41); San Miguel de Allende, Mexico
- Occupations: Author; poet
- Spouse(s): LuAnne Henderson (1945–1948; annulled), Carolyn Cassady (1948–1963; divorced)
- Partner(s): Diane Hansen (1950–?), Anne Murphy (?–1968)
- Children: 5
- Writing career
- Genre: Beat poetry
- Notable work: The First Third

Neal Leon Cassady (February 8, 1926 – February 4, 1968) was an American writer who was a major figure of the Beat Generation of the 1950s and the psychedelic and counterculture movements of the 1960s.

Cassady published only two short fragments of prose in his lifetime, but exerted considerable intellectual and stylistic influence through his conversation and correspondence. Letters, poems, and an unfinished autobiographical novel have been published since his death.

He was prominently featured as himself in the "scroll" (first draft) version of Jack Kerouac's novel On the Road, and was the model for the character Dean Moriarty in the 1957 version of that book. In many of Kerouac's later books, Cassady is represented by the character Cody Pomeray. Cassady also appeared in Allen Ginsberg's poems and in several other works of literature by other writers.

== Biography ==
=== Early years ===
Cassady was born to Maude Jean (Scheuer) and Neal Marshall Cassady in Salt Lake City, Utah. His mother died when he was 10, and he was raised by his alcoholic father in Denver, Colorado. Cassady spent much of his youth either living on the streets of skid row, with his father, or in reform school.

As a youth, Cassady was repeatedly involved in petty crime. He was arrested for car theft when he was 14, for shoplifting and car theft when he was 15, and for car theft and fencing stolen property when he was 16.

In 1941, the 15-year-old Cassady met Justin W. Brierly, a prominent Denver educator. Brierly was well known as a mentor of promising young men and was impressed by Cassady's intelligence. Over the next few years, Brierly helped admit Cassady to East High School where he taught Cassady as a student, encouraged and supervised his reading, and found employment for him. Cassady continued his criminal activities, and he was arrested repeatedly from 1942 to 1944; on at least one of these occasions, he was released by law enforcement into Brierly's safekeeping. In June 1944, Cassady was arrested for possession of stolen goods and served 11 months of a one-year prison sentence. Brierly and he actively exchanged letters during this period, even through Cassady's intermittent incarcerations; this correspondence represents Cassady's earliest group of surviving letters. Some authors have suggested that Brierly and Cassady may have had a sexual relationship.

=== Personal life ===
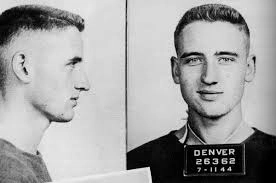
1944 Denver mug shot of Cassady

In October 1945, after being released from prison, Cassady married 16-year-old Lu Anne Henderson. In 1946, the couple traveled to New York City to visit their friend, Hal Chase, another protégé of Brierly's. While visiting Chase at Columbia University, Cassady met Jack Kerouac and Allen Ginsberg. Although Cassady did not attend Columbia, he soon became friends with them and their acquaintances, some of whom later became members of the Beat Generation. While in New York, Cassady persuaded Kerouac to teach him to write fiction. Cassady's second wife, Carolyn, has stated "Neal, having been raised in the slums of Denver amongst the world's lost men, determined to make more of himself, to become somebody, to be worthy and respected. His genius mind absorbed every book he could find, whether literature, philosophy, or science. Jack had a formal education, which Neal envied, but intellectually he was more than a match for Jack, and they enjoyed long discussions on every subject."

Carolyn Robinson met Cassady in 1947 while she was studying for her master's in theater arts at the University of Denver. Five weeks after Lu Anne's departure, Cassady got an annulment from Lu Anne and married Carolyn on April 1, 1948. Carolyn's book Off the Road: Twenty Years with Cassady, Kerouac and Ginsberg (1990) details her marriage to Cassady and recalls him as "the archetype of the American Man". Cassady's sexual relationship with Ginsberg lasted off and on for the next 20 years.

During this period, Cassady worked for the Southern Pacific Railroad and kept in touch with his "Beat" acquaintances, even as they became increasingly different philosophically. While working there he lived in San Francisco at 29 Russell Street.

The couple eventually had three children and settled down in a ranch house in Monte Sereno, California, 50 miles (80 km) south of San Francisco, where Kerouac and Ginsberg sometimes visited. This home, built in 1954 with money from a settlement from Southern Pacific Railroad for a train-related accident, was demolished in August 1997. In 1950, Cassady bigamously married Diane Hansen, a young model who was pregnant with his child, Curtis.

Cassady traveled cross-country with both Kerouac and Ginsberg on multiple occasions, including the trips documented in Kerouac's On the Road.

=== Role of drugs ===
Following an arrest in 1958 for offering to share a small amount of marijuana with an undercover agent at a San Francisco nightclub, Cassady served a two-year sentence at California's San Quentin State Prison. After his release in June 1960, he struggled to meet family obligations, and Carolyn divorced him when his parole period expired in 1963. Carolyn stated that she was looking to relieve Cassady of the burden of supporting a family, but "this was a mistake and removed the last pillar of his self-esteem".

After the divorce, in 1963, Cassady shared an apartment with Allen Ginsberg and Beat poet Charles Plymell at 1403 Gough Street in San Francisco. Regarding Ginsberg's poetry, Carolyn Cassady told American Legends website: "I do not know of any poem of Allen's that Neal favored. He would get the meaning, but Neal wasn't so much into poetry as was Jack. Neal had a logical and analytical mind. He liked philosophy and investigating the causes of events and actions. Practical, useful stuff."

Cassady first met author Ken Kesey during the summer of 1962; he eventually became one of the Merry Pranksters, a group that formed around Kesey in 1964, who were vocal proponents of the use of psychedelic drugs.

=== Travels and death ===
During 1964, Cassady served as the main driver of the bus named Furthur on the iconic first half of the journey from San Francisco to New York, which was immortalized by Tom Wolfe's book The Electric Kool-Aid Acid Test (1968). Cassady appears at length in Magic Trip (2011), a documentary film about the Merry Pranksters and their cross-country trip.

In January 1967, Cassady traveled to Mexico with fellow prankster George "Barely Visible" Walker and Cassady's longtime girlfriend Anne Murphy. In a beachside house just south of Puerto Vallarta, they were joined by Barbara Wilson and Walter Cox.

For the next year, Cassady's life became less stable, and the pace of his travels more frenetic. He left Mexico in May, traveling to San Francisco, Denver, New York City, and other cities. Cassady then returned to Mexico in September and October (stopping in San Antonio on the way to visit his oldest daughter, who had just given birth to his first grandchild), visited Ken Kesey's farm in Oregon in December, and spent the New Year with Carolyn at a friend's house near San Francisco. Finally, in late January 1968, Cassady returned to Mexico.

On February 3, 1968, Cassady attended a wedding party in San Miguel de Allende, Mexico. After the party, he went walking along a railroad track to reach the next town, but passed out in the cold and rainy night wearing nothing but a T-shirt and jeans. In the morning, he was found in a coma by the tracks, reportedly by Anton Black, later a professor at El Paso Community College, who carried Cassady over his shoulders to the local post office building. Cassady was transported to the closest hospital, where he died a few hours later on February 4, aged 41.

The exact cause of Cassady's death remains uncertain. Those who attended the wedding party confirm that he took an unknown quantity of secobarbital, a powerful barbiturate. The physician who performed the autopsy wrote "general congestion in all systems." When interviewed later, the physician stated that he was unable to give an accurate report because Cassady was a foreigner and there were drugs involved. "Exposure" is commonly cited as his cause of death, but his widow believes he may have died of kidney failure.

=== Children ===
Cassady has five known children: Robert William Hyatt Jr. (1945), Cathleen Joanne Cassady (1948), Jami Cassady Ratto (1949-2026), Curtis W. Hansen (1950), and John Allen Cassady (1951-2026). Robert, son of Cassady and Maxine Beam, is an artist working in Arvada, Colorado. In February 2017, he was featured in Westword magazine. Cathleen, known as Cathy, is the mother of the only grandchild Cassady met. Cathy (along with Jami and John before their deaths) keeps a website in memory of their parents and parents' "beat" friends.

Curt, born from Cassady's marriage with Diana Hansen, died April 30, 2014, aged 63. He was one of the co-founders of radio station WEBE 108 in Bridgeport, Connecticut.

== Writing style and influence ==
Cassady is credited with helping Kerouac break with his Thomas Wolfe–influenced, sentimental style, as seen in The Town and the City (1950). After reading Cassady's letters, Kerouac was inspired to write his story in Cassady's communication style: "in a rush of mad ecstasy, without self-consciousness or mental hesitation".

This fluid writing style, reading more like a stream of consciousness or hypermanic rapid-fire conversation than written prose, is best demonstrated within Cassady's letters to family and friends. In a letter to Kerouac from 1953, Cassady begins with the following fervent sentence:

Well it's about time you wrote, I was fearing you farted out on top that mean mountain or slid under while pissing in Pismo, beach of flowers, food and foolishness, but I knew the fear was ill-founded for balancing it in my thoughts of you, much stronger and valid if you weren't dead, was a realization of the experiences you would be having down there, rail, home, and the most important, climate, by a remembrance of my own feelings and thoughts (former low, or more exactly, nostalgic and unreal; latter hi) as, for example, I too seemed to spend time looking out upper floor windows at sparse, especially night times, traffic in females—old or young.

On the Road became a sensation. By capturing Cassady's voice, Kerouac discovered a unique style of his own that he called "spontaneous prose," a stream of consciousness prose form.

Cassady's own written work never was published formally in his lifetime, and he left behind only a half-written manuscript and a number of personal letters. Cassady admitted to Kerouac in a letter from 1948: "My prose has no individual style as such, but is rather an unspoken and still unexpressed groping toward the personal. There is something there that wants to come out; something of my own that must be said. Yet, perhaps, words are not the way for me."

== In popular culture ==
=== In film ===
==== Archival footage ====
- Anthem to Beauty (1997).
- Love Always, Carolyn — A film about Kerouac, Cassady and Me (2011), a documentary that features Cassady in archival segments, as well as interviews with Cassady's ex-wife Carolyn and his children.
- Magic Trip (2011), a documentary film using the footage shot by Ken Kesey and the Merry Pranksters during their cross-country bus trip in the Furthur bus; the hyperkinetic Cassady is frequently seen driving the bus, jabbering, and sitting next to a sign that boasts, "Neal gets things done."
- The Other One: The Long Strange Trip of Bob Weir (2015).

==== Dramatizations ====
- The film Who'll Stop the Rain (1978) is a psychological drama released by United Artists. The film is based on Robert Stone's novel Dog Soldiers (1974), and stars Nick Nolte as Ray Hicks. Stone based the character of Hicks on Beat writer Neal Cassady. Stone became acquainted with Cassady through novelist Ken Kesey, a classmate of Stone in graduate school at Stanford University. Hicks' death scene on the railroad tracks at the film's conclusion was directly based on Cassady's death along a railroad track outside of San Miguel de Allende, Mexico, in 1968.
- Heart Beat (1980), which portrays Neal Cassady's friendship with Jack Kerouac, stars Nick Nolte as Cassady and John Heard as Kerouac. The film was based on the memoir of the same name by Carolyn Cassady (played by Sissy Spacek). Talk show host Steve Allen, who was a big supporter of On The Road, appears briefly as himself. Released immediately after Warner Bros. acquired Orion Pictures, the film was given a limited release due to studio politics and a perceived lack of public interest. The film quickly fell from view.
- What Happened to Kerouac (1986).
- The Last Time I Committed Suicide (1997), with Thomas Jane as Cassady, is based on the "Joan Anderson letter" written by Cassady to Jack Kerouac in December 1950. Until 2014, much of this letter was thought to have been lost, though an excerpt had been published in a 1964 edition of John Bryan's magazine Notes from Underground.
- A short film Luz Del Mundo (2007) deals with Cassady's friendship and adventures with Jack Kerouac. Cassady is played by Austin Nichols, and Kerouac is played by Will Estes.
- In the film Across the Universe (2007), the character Dr. Robert, played by Bono, is said to have been inspired by Neal Cassady.
- Neal Cassady (2007), a biographical film focused mostly on the Merry Prankster years and stars Tate Donovan as Neal, Amy Ryan as Carolyn Cassady, Chris Bauer as Kesey, and Glenn Fitzgerald as Kerouac; Noah Buschel wrote and directed the film, which deals primarily with how Neal became trapped by his fictional alter-ego, Dean Moriarty. The Cassady family criticized this film as highly inaccurate.
- Howl (2010), Jon Prescott, chronicles Allen Ginsberg's creation of the poem "Howl" and the obscenity trial surrounding its publication; Jon Prescott portrays Cassady.
- In On the Road (2012), the dramatic adaptation of the book, Neal Cassady/Dean Moriarty is portrayed by Garrett Hedlund.
- In Big Sur (2013), Josh Lucas portrays Cassady.

=== In literature ===
- David Amram's Offbeat: Collaborating with Kerouac (2002)
- Charles Bukowski's Notes of a Dirty Old Man (1969) as Kerouac's boy Neal C
- Allen Ginsberg:
  - "The Green Automobile" (1953) as my old companion
  - "Howl" (1956) as N.C., secret hero of these poems
  - "Many Loves" (1956)
  - "On Neal's Ashes" (1968)
  - "The Fall of America" (1968)
  - "Elegies for Neal Cassady" (1968)
- John Clellon Holmes:
  - Go (1952) as Hart Kennedy
  - The Horn (1958) as the driver
- Jack Kerouac:
  - On the Road (1957) as Dean Moriarty. Cassady was the model for the character Dean Moriarty in Kerouac's On the Road and the character Cody Pomeray in many of Kerouac's other novels. In the surviving first draft of On the Road, which Kerouac typed on a 120-foot roll of paper specially constructed for that purpose, the story's protagonist's name remains Neal Cassady. However, in Kerouac's final edition of On The Road, Cassady's character is known as Dean Moriarty. In On the Road, the narrator, Sal Paradise (representing Jack Kerouac) states "He was simply a youth tremendously excited with life, and though he was a con-man, he was only conning because he wanted so much to live and to get involved with people who would otherwise pay no attention to him...Somewhere along the line, I knew there'd be girls, visions, everything; somewhere along the line, the pearl would be handed to me."
  - The Subterraneans (1958) as Leroy
  - The Dharma Bums (1958) as Cody
  - Book of Dreams (1960) as Cody Pomeray
  - Visions of Cody (1960; published 1973) as Cody Pomeray
  - Big Sur (1962) as Cody Pomeray
  - Desolation Angels (novel) (1965) as Cody Pomeray
- Ken Kesey:
  - "Over the Border" (1973), as Houlihan
  - Kesey also wrote a fictional account of Cassady's death in the short story "The Day After Superman Died" (1979, referring to Cassady as Houlihan), wherein Cassady is portrayed as mumbling about the number of railroad ties he had counted on the line (64,928) as his last words before dying. It was published as a part of Kesey's collection Demon Box (1986).
- Phil Lesh's Searching for the Sound: My Life with the Grateful Dead (2005)
- Nick Mamatas' Move Under Ground (2004)
- Chuck Rosenthal's Jack Kerouac's Avatar Angel: His Last Novel (2001) as Cody Pomeray
- Robert Stone:
  - "Porque No Tiene, Porque Le Falta" (1969), as Willie Wings
  - Dog Soldiers (1974), as Ray Hicks
  - Prime Green: Remembering the Sixties (2007)
- In Hunter S. Thompson's book Hell's Angels (1966), Cassady is described as "the worldly inspiration for the protagonist of two recent novels", drunkenly yelling at police during the famed Hells Angels parties at Ken Kesey's residence in La Honda, California. Although Cassady's name was removed from the book at the insistence of Thompson's publisher, the description is clearly a reference to the character based on Cassady in Jack Kerouac's works On the Road and Visions of Cody (1951–1952).
- Tom Wolfe chronicled Cassady's drunken yelling at police during Hells Angels parties in The Electric Kool-Aid Acid Test (1968).

=== In music ===
- Tom Waits recorded "Jack & Neal /California, Here I Come," on his 1977 album Foreign Affairs.
- Aztec Two Step memorialized Cassady in the song "The Persecution & Restoration of Dean Moriarty (On The Road)" on their 1972 debut album.
- Death Cab for Cutie loosely based their song "Styrofoam Plates" from The Photo Album (2001) on the events of Cassady's life depicted in On the Road.
- The Doobie Brothers guitarist and songwriter Patrick Simmons refers to Cassady in his song "Neal's Fandango" as his incentive for taking to the road.
- Cassady lived with The Grateful Dead at 710 Ashbury Street in 1967, and is immortalized in "The Other One" section of their song "That's It for the Other One", as the bus driver "Cowboy Neal" behind the wheel.
- A second Grateful Dead song, "Cassidy" by John Perry Barlow might seem to be a misspelling of Cassady's name. However, in fact, the song celebrates the 1970 birth of baby girl Cassidy Law into the Grateful Dead family, while including references to Neal Cassady, his death and the birth of the girl.
- Bocephus King sings a song called "Cowboy Neal".
- The progressive rock band King Crimson released a song titled "Neal and Jack and Me" on their album Beat (1982).
- Morrissey's album World Peace Is None of Your Business (2014) features a track titled "Neal Cassady Drops Dead".
- The band Moriarty is named after the fictional character Dean Moriarty that Kerouac created from Neal Cassady.
- Jazz guitarist John Scofield wrote a song titled "Cassidae" [sic], released on his album Who's who? (1979).
- Singer-songwriter Eric Taylor's song "Dean Moriarty" (1995) describes a character patterned after Neal Cassady.
- Fatboy Slim produced the track "Neal Cassady Starts Here" that appeared as a B-side to the singles "Santa Cruz" and "Everybody Needs A 303" (1996).
- The Beat-inspired band Washington Squares released a song titled "Neal Cassady" on their album Fair and Square (1989).
- A photo of Neal Cassady appears on the cover of The Soft Bulletin by The Flaming Lips.

== Published works ==
- "The Joan Anderson Letter", written by Cassady to Jack Kerouac (December 1950): It was, until 2014, thought to have been lost, but an excerpt had been published in a 1964 edition of John Bryan's magazine Notes from Underground. Associated Press reported in November 24, 2014, that the entire letter had been found. The 18-page letter, which is said to have substantially inspired Kerouac's subsequent writing style, was to be auctioned on December 17, 2014, but a legal dispute over ownership prevented the auction from proceeding. The original letter was auctioned by Heritage Auctions as Lot 45378 on March 8, 2017.
- "Pull My Daisy" (1951, poetry) written with Jack Kerouac and Allen Ginsberg
- "Map to Kesey's", manuscript note reproduced in facsimile, Genesis West 7 (Volume 3, Issue 1 and 2), Winter 1965, p. 50 (open access at JSTOR).
- "First Night of the Tapes" with Jack Kerouac. Transatlantic Review, December 1969
- The First Third (1971, autobiographical novel), published three years after Cassady's death
- As Ever: The Collected Correspondence of Allen Ginsberg & Neal Cassady. Berkeley: Creative Arts Book Company, 1977. ISBN 978-0916870089
- Grace Beats Karma: Letters from Prison (collection of poetry and letters). New York City: Blast Books, 1993. ISBN 0-922233-08-X
- Neal Cassady: Collected Letters, 1944–1967 (2004, letters)

== Biographies ==
- The Holy Goof: A Biography of Neal Cassady by William Plummer (1981)
- Neal Cassady, Volume One, 1926–1940 by Tom Christopher (1995)
- Neal Cassady, Volume Two, 1941–1946 by Tom Christopher (1998)
- Neal Cassady: The Fast Life of a Beat Hero by David Sandison & Graham Vickers (2006)
- Off the Road: Twenty Years with Cassady, Kerouac, and Ginsberg by Carolyn Cassady (1990)
- Tripping with a Viper: The Unexpurgated, True Story of Neal Cassady & Anne Murphy, by Anne Marie Maxwell (2024)

== Literary studies ==
- Stephenson, Gregory (2007) [1987]. "Friendly and Flowing Savage: The Literary Legend of Neal Cassady". Incorporated in The Daybreak Boys: Essays on the Literature of the Beat Generation (1990).
