= Ken Babbs =

American novelist (born 1936)

Ken Babbs (born January 14, 1936) is a Merry Prankster who became one of the psychedelic leaders of the 1960s. He along with best friend and Prankster leader, Ken Kesey, wrote the book Last Go Round. Babbs is best known for his participation in the Acid Tests and on the bus Furthur.

== Early life ==
Ken Babbs was born January 14, 1936, and raised in Mentor, Ohio. He attended the Case Institute of Technology where he briefly studied engineering for two years on a basketball scholarship, before transferring to Miami University, from which he graduated magna cum laude with a degree in English literature in 1958. He then attended the Stanford University graduate creative writing program on a Woodrow Wilson National Fellowship from 1958 to 1959; having entered the NROTC program to fund his undergraduate studies, Babbs was commissioned as a second lieutenant in the United States Marine Corps following the end of his fellowship.

He trained as a helicopter pilot and served in one of the first American advisory units in Vietnam from 1962 to 1963 prior to his discharge. Babbs had no understanding of the impact the war had on him until he received his orders to go to Vietnam. Babbs later stated that he "had no perceptions of the right or wrong of the situation before I went to Vietnam, but it took about six weeks to realize we were wasting our time there... being humble, respect[ing] local customs, learn[ing] the language and helping does more good than hurting." While serving in Vietnam he began writing about his experience.

In the fall of 1958, Babbs took a writing class at Stanford University with another Wilson Fellow, Ken Kesey. Babbs later described his friendship with Kesey as "many a moment of [shared] mirth and sadness, highness and lowliness, interchanging of ideas and musical moments." They maintained a correspondence while Babbs was stationed in the Far East with the Marines, and eventually formed the Merry Pranksters.

== Merry Pranksters ==
What started as a Happening or series of theatrical performances eventually emerged into a movement. According to Babbs, a Happening is something that "can’t be planned ..It just happens! It takes place in public or private and involves everyone present. In Phoenix in 1964, we painted "A Vote for Barry is a Vote for Fun" on the side of the bus and waved flags and played stars and stripes forever..this qualified as both a prank and a Happening."

=== Furthur ===
The most famous happening of the Pranksters was the nationwide trip on the 1939 International Harvester school bus named Furthur. While on a trip to New York City, the Pranksters needed an automobile that could hold fourteen people and all of their filming and taping equipment. One of the members saw a "revamped school bus" in San Francisco that was for sale, the Pranksters bought the bus and named it Furthur. Babbs was the engineer for the bus.

Ken Babbs is mostly credited for the sound systems he created for the Trips Festival, a 1966 three day music festival held in San Francisco. Prior to Babbs’ creation, it was discovered that particular music usually sounded distorted when cranked to high levels because of the concrete floor in the San Francisco Longshoreman's Union Hall (where the Trips Festival was taking place). Babbs being a sound engineer resolved the problem. He made sound amplifiers that would not create distorted sounds when turned up to high sound levels.

The purpose for this Happening was to link the psychedelic tribes from the west and the east. Many people tend to remember the east tribe because of Timothy Leary and LSD. Many misjudgments have been made on the Pranksters and their promotion of LSD. However, Babbs makes it clear that "just because we used LSD does not mean we were promoting its use. (LSD) is a dangerous drug...[It’s] a way, I guess, of breaking down the conformist ideology."

In May 1972, Babbs and Kesey met with Oregon Governor Tom McCall to discuss decriminalization and legalization of marijuana in Oregon. Their proposal was to create an Oregon Marijuana Control Commission which would distribute marijuana through the state owned Oregon Liquor Control Commission stores, thus assuring control over marijuana quality and tax collection by the State of Oregon. The Governor replied that he would immediately push for decriminalization of one ounce or less of marijuana by the end of 1972 and hold off the idea of total decriminalization of Oregon (which happened in 2014). This meeting of the Governor and Kesey and Babbs led to Oregon being the first state in the US to decriminalize marijuana possession and eventually the first state to legalize marijuana sales.

=== Acid Tests ===
During the legendary Prankster cross-country bus trip to the New York World's fair in 1964, a movie was filmed during the process. The film shot on a camera and 16 mm color film was intended to be called The Merry Pranksters Search for a Kool Place. However, in 1999, a 50-minute edit of the movie was released, and in 2002 another excerpt was distributed but not completed. The 2011 documentary film, Magic Trip featured much of the footage. The Acid Tests were inspired from when the Pranksters met the Grateful Dead.

The Hog Farm collective was established through a chain of events beginning with Ken Babbs hijacking the Merry Pranksters' bus, Furthur, to Mexico, which stranded the Merry Pranksters in Los Angeles.

== Later years ==
Babbs currently lives on his farm in Dexter, Oregon (near Kesey's house) with his wife Eileen, a high school English teacher.

In 1994, he helped Kesey co-write The Last Go Round, about the oldest and largest rodeos in America.

In 2011, Babbs published Who Shot the Water Buffalo?, a coming of age novel about the Vietnam war. Based on his early writing and his life in the armed forces during the first years of the Vietnam War, it took him 45 years to finish writing the book. In January 2022 Tsunami Books of Eugene, Oregon published Babbs' recently completed memoir "Cronies."
