= Sometimes a Great Notion =

1964 novel by Ken Kesey

- First edition
- Author: Ken Kesey
- Language: English
- Publisher: Viking Press
- Publication date: July 27, 1964
- Publication place: United States
- Media type: Print (Hardback and Paperback)
- Pages: 715
- OCLC: 71045661
- Dewey Decimal: 813/.54 22
- LC Class: PS3561.E667 S6 2006

Sometimes a Great Notion is the second novel by American author Ken Kesey, published in 1964. While One Flew Over the Cuckoo's Nest (1962) is more famous, many critics consider Sometimes a Great Notion Kesey's magnum opus. The story involves an Oregon family of gyppo loggers who cut trees for a local mill in opposition to unionized workers who are on strike.

Kesey took the title from the song "Goodnight, Irene", popularized by Lead Belly.

Sometimes I lives in the country
Sometimes I lives in the town
Sometimes I haves a great notion
To jump into the river an' drown

== Plot ==
The story centers on the Stamper family, a hard-headed logging clan in the coastal town of Wakonda, on the Oregon coast, (Note: A fictional coastal town, not the real, inland, Waconda, Oregon) in the early 1960s. The union loggers in Wakonda go on strike to demand the same pay for shorter hours in response to the decreasing need for labor. The Stampers, however, own and operate a small family business independent of the unions and decide to continue working to supply the regionally owned mill with all the timber the laborers would have supplied had the strike not occurred. The rest of the town is outraged.

This decision and its surrounding details are examined alongside the complex histories, relationships, and rivalries of the members of the Stamper family: Henry Stamper, the elderly, politically and socially conservative patriarch of the family, whose motto "Never Give a Inch!" has defined the nature of the family and its dynamic with the rest of the town; Hank, the older son of Henry, whose indefatigable will and stubborn personality make him a natural leader but whose subtle insecurities threaten the stability of his family; Leland, the younger son of Henry and half-brother of Hank, who as a child left Wakonda for the East Coast with his mother, but whose eccentric behavior and desire for revenge against Hank lead him back to Oregon when his mother dies; and Viv, whose love for her husband Hank fades as she realizes her subordinate place in the Stamper household.

The Stamper house, built on an isolated bank of the Wakonda Auga River, manifests the physical obstinacy of the Stamper family. As the nearby river slowly widens and erodes the surrounding land, all the other houses on the river have either been consumed or wrecked by the waters or been rebuilt further from the bank, except the Stamper house, which stands on a precarious peninsula struggling to maintain every inch of land with the help of an arsenal of boards, sandbags, cables, and other miscellaneous items brandished by Henry Stamper in his fight against the encroaching river.

== Reception ==
In The Electric Kool-Aid Acid Test, Tom Wolfe noted that initial reviews of the book varied widely. Commenting in the Saturday Review in a 1964 piece entitled "Beatnik in Lumberjack Country", critic Granville Hicks wrote: "In his first novel, One Flew Over the Cuckoo's Nest, Ken Kesey demonstrated that he was a forceful, inventive and ambitious writer. All of these qualities are exhibited, in even higher degree, in Sometimes a Great Notion. Here he has told a fascinating story in a fascinating way." Also in the Saturday Review, John Barkham wrote: "A novelist of unusual talent and imagination ... a huge, turbulent tale ..." Maurice Dolbier, in the New York Herald Tribune, wrote: "In the fiction wilderness, this is a towering redwood." In his introduction to the Penguin edition, Charles Bowden called it "one of the few essential books written by an American in the last half century."

In 1997, a panel of writers from the Pacific Northwest voted it number one in a list of "12 Essential Northwest Works". One critic described it as "...what may well be the quintessential Northwest novel". Wolfe and others compared it to William Faulkner's Absalom, Absalom! in both form and content. Wolfe also noted, however, that Time characterized it as "a big novel—but that it was overwritten and had failed."

== Adaptations ==
In 1970, the novel was adapted into a film, which was retitled Never Give a Inch [sic], for television. The film was directed by Paul Newman, who starred alongside Henry Fonda. It was nominated for two Oscars.

A stage adaptation, written and directed by Aaron Posner, premiered in Portland, Oregon, at Portland Center Stage on April 4, 2008.
