= Ken Kesey =

American writer and countercultural figure (1935–2001)

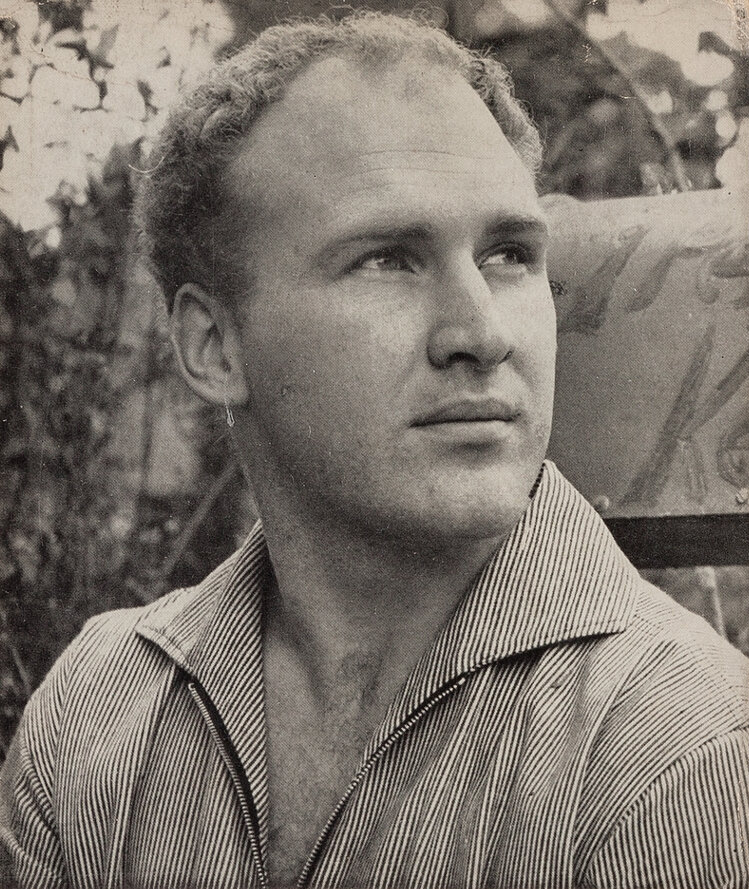
- Photo of Kesey from One Flew Over the Cuckoo's Nest (1962)
- Born: Kenneth Elton Kesey; September 17, 1935; La Junta, Colorado, U.S.
- Died: November 10, 2001 (aged 66); Eugene, Oregon, U.S.
- Education: University of Oregon (BA, 1957); Stanford University
- Occupations: Novelist; short story writer; essayist; poet
- Spouse: Norma "Faye" Haxby (m. 1956)
- Children: 4
- Relatives: Chuck Kesey (brother)
- Writing career
- Genre: Postmodernism
- Notable works: One Flew Over the Cuckoo's Nest (1962); Sometimes a Great Notion (1964)
- Movement: Countercultural

Kenneth Elton Kesey (/ˈkiːzi/; September 17, 1935 – November 10, 2001) was an American novelist, essayist, and countercultural figure. He considered himself a link between the Beat Generation of the 1950s and the hippies of the 1960s.

Kesey was born in La Junta, Colorado, and grew up in Springfield, Oregon, graduating from the University of Oregon in 1957. He began writing One Flew Over the Cuckoo's Nest in 1960 after completing a graduate fellowship in creative writing at Stanford University; the novel was an immediate commercial and critical success when published two years later. During this period, Kesey was used by the CIA (supposedly without his knowledge) in the Project MKULTRA involving hallucinogenic drugs (including mescaline and LSD), which was done to try to make people insane to put them under the control of interrogators.

After One Flew Over the Cuckoo's Nest was published, Kesey moved to nearby La Honda, California, and began hosting "happenings" with former colleagues from Stanford, bohemian and literary figures including Neal Cassady and other friends, who became collectively known as the Merry Pranksters. As documented in Tom Wolfe's 1968 New Journalism book The Electric Kool-Aid Acid Test, some of the parties were promoted to the public as Acid Tests, and integrated the consumption of LSD with multimedia performances. He mentored the Grateful Dead, who were the Acid Tests' house band, and continued to exert a profound influence upon the group throughout their career.

Kesey's second novel, Sometimes a Great Notion, was a commercial success that polarized some critics and readers upon its release in 1964. An epic account of the vicissitudes of an Oregon logging family that aspired to the modernist grandeur of William Faulkner's Yoknapatawpha saga, Kesey regarded it as his magnum opus.

In 1965, after being arrested for marijuana possession and faking suicide, Kesey was imprisoned for five months. Shortly thereafter, he returned home to the Willamette Valley and settled in Pleasant Hill, Oregon, where he maintained a secluded, family-oriented lifestyle for the rest of his life. In addition to teaching at the University of Oregon—an experience that culminated in Caverns (1989), a collaborative novel by Kesey and his graduate workshop students under the pseudonym "O.U. Levon"—he continued to regularly contribute fiction and reportage to such publications as Esquire, Rolling Stone, Oui, Running, and The Whole Earth Catalog; various iterations of these pieces were collected in Kesey's Garage Sale (1973) and Demon Box (1986).

Between 1974 and 1980, Kesey published six issues of Spit in the Ocean, a literary magazine that featured excerpts from an unfinished novel (Seven Prayers by Grandma Whittier, an account of Kesey's grandmother's struggle with Alzheimer's disease) and contributions from writers including Margo St. James, Kate Millett, Stewart Brand, Saul-Paul Sirag, Jack Sarfatti, Paul Krassner and William S. Burroughs. After a third novel (Sailor Song) was released to lukewarm reviews in 1992, he reunited with the Merry Pranksters and began publishing works on the Internet until ill health (including a stroke) curtailed his activities.

== Biography ==
=== Early life ===
Kesey was born in 1935 in La Junta, Colorado, to dairy farmers Geneva (née Smith) and Frederick A. Kesey. When Kesey was 10 years old in 1946, the family moved to Springfield, Oregon. Kesey was a champion wrestler in high school and college in the 174-pound (79 kg) weight division. During high school, Kesey almost qualified to be on the Olympic team; however, a serious shoulder injury halted his wrestling career. He graduated from Springfield High School in 1953. An avid reader and filmgoer, the young Kesey took John Wayne, Edgar Rice Burroughs, and Zane Grey as his role models (later naming a son Zane) and toyed with magic, ventriloquism and hypnotism.

While attending the University of Oregon School of Journalism and Communication in neighboring Eugene in 1956, Kesey eloped with his high-school sweetheart, Oregon State College student Norma "Faye" Haxby, whom he had met in seventh grade. According to Kesey, "Without Faye, I would have been swept overboard by notoriety and weird, dope-fueled ideas and flower-child girls with beamy eyes and bulbous breasts." Married until his death, they had three children: Jed, Zane, and Shannon. Additionally, with Faye's approval, Kesey fathered a daughter, Sunshine Kesey, with fellow Merry Prankster Carolyn "Mountain Girl" Adams. Born in 1966, Sunshine was raised by Adams and her stepfather, Jerry Garcia.

Kesey had a football scholarship for his first year, but switched to the University of Oregon wrestling team as a better fit for his build. After posting a .885 winning percentage in the 1956–57 season, he received the Fred Low Scholarship for outstanding Northwest wrestler. In 1957, Kesey was second in his weight class at the Pacific Coast intercollegiate competition. He remains in the top 10 of Oregon Wrestling's all-time winning percentage.

A member of Beta Theta Pi throughout his studies, Kesey graduated from the University of Oregon with a BA in speech and communication in 1957. Increasingly disengaged by the playwriting and screenwriting courses that comprised much of his major, he began to take literature classes in the second half of his collegiate career with James B. Hall, a cosmopolitan alumnus of the Iowa Writers' Workshop who had previously taught at Cornell University and later served as provost of College V at the University of California, Santa Cruz. Hall took on Kesey as his protégé and cultivated his interest in literary fiction, introducing Kesey (whose reading interests were hitherto confined to science fiction) to the works of Ernest Hemingway and other paragons of literary modernism. After the last of several brief summer sojourns as a struggling actor in Los Angeles, Kesey published his first short story ("First Sunday of September") in the Northwest Review and successfully applied to the highly selective Woodrow Wilson National Fellowship for the 1958–59 academic year.

Unbeknownst to Kesey, who applied at Hall's request, the maverick literary critic Leslie Fiedler (then based at the University of Montana) successfully importuned the regional fellowship committee to select the "rough-hewn" Kesey alongside more traditional fellows from Reed College and other elite institutions. Because he lacked the prerequisites to work toward a traditional master's degree in English as a communications major, Kesey elected to enroll in the non-degree program at Stanford University's Creative Writing Center that fall. While studying and working in the Stanford milieu over the next five years, most of them spent as a resident of Perry Lane (a historically bohemian enclave next to the university golf course), he developed intimate lifelong friendships with fellow writers Ken Babbs, Larry McMurtry, Wendell Berry, Ed McClanahan, Gurney Norman and Robert Stone.

During his initial fellowship year, Kesey frequently clashed with center director Wallace Stegner, who regarded him as "a sort of highly talented illiterate" and rejected Kesey's application for a departmental Stegner Fellowship before permitting his attendance as a Woodrow Wilson Fellow. Reinforcing these perceptions, Stegner's deputy Richard Scowcroft later recalled that "neither Wally nor I thought he had a particularly important talent." According to Stone, Stegner "saw Kesey... as a threat to civilization and intellectualism and sobriety" and continued to reject Kesey's Stegner Fellowship applications for the 1959–60 and 1960–61 terms.

Nevertheless, Kesey received the prestigious $2,000 Harper-Saxton Prize for his first novel in progress (the oft-rejected Zoo) and audited the graduate writing seminar—a courtesy nominally accorded to former Stegner Fellows, although Kesey only secured his place by falsely claiming to Scowcroft that his colleague (on sabbatical through 1960) "had said that he could attend classes for free"—through the 1960–61 term. The course was initially taught that year by Viking Press editorial consultant and Lost Generation eminence grise Malcolm Cowley, who was "always glad to see" Kesey and fellow auditor Tillie Olsen. Cowley was succeeded the following quarter by the Irish short-story specialist Frank O'Connor; frequent spats between O'Connor and Kesey ultimately precipitated his departure from the class. While under Cowley's tutelage, he began to draft and workshop a manuscript that evolved into One Flew Over the Cuckoo's Nest.

Reflecting upon this period in a 1999 interview with Robert K. Elder, Kesey recalled, "I was too young to be a beatnik, and too old to be a hippie."

=== Experimentation with psychedelic drugs ===
At the invitation of Perry Lane neighbor and Stanford psychology graduate student Vic Lovell, Kesey was tricked into volunteering to take part in what turned out to be a CIA-financed study under the aegis of Project MKULTRA, a highly secret military program, at the Menlo Park Veterans' Hospital, where he worked as a night aide. The project studied the effects of hallucinogens and other psychoactive drugs, particularly LSD, psilocybin, mescaline, cocaine, AMT, and DMT. Kesey wrote many detailed accounts of his experiences with these drugs, both during the study and in the years of private drug use that followed.

Kesey's role as a medical guinea pig, as well as his stint working at the Veterans' Administration hospital, inspired One Flew Over the Cuckoo's Nest. The book's success, as well as the demolition of the Perry Lane cabins in August 1963, allowed him to move to a log house in La Honda, California, a rustic hamlet in the Santa Cruz Mountains 15 miles southwest of Stanford University. He frequently entertained friends and many others with parties he called "Acid Tests", involving music (including Kesey's favorite band, the Grateful Dead), black lights, fluorescent paint, strobe lights, LSD, and other psychedelic effects. These parties were described in some of Allen Ginsberg's poems and served as the basis for Tom Wolfe's The Electric Kool-Aid Acid Test, an early exemplar of the nonfiction novel. Other firsthand accounts of the Acid Tests appear in Living with the Dead by Rock Scully and David Dalton, Hell's Angels: The Strange and Terrible Saga of the Outlaw Motorcycle Gangs by Hunter S. Thompson and the 1967 Hells Angels memoir Freewheelin Frank: Secretary of the Angels (Frank Reynolds; ghostwritten by Michael McClure).

=== One Flew Over the Cuckoo's Nest ===
While enrolled at the University of Oregon in 1957, Kesey wrote End of Autumn; according to Rick Dogson, the novel "focused on the exploitation of college athletes by telling the tale of a football lineman who was having second thoughts about the game". Kesey came to regard the unpublished work as juvenilia, but an excerpt served as his Stanford Creative Writing Center application sample.

During his Woodrow Wilson Fellowship year, Kesey wrote Zoo, a novel about beatniks living in the North Beach community of San Francisco, but it was never published.

The inspiration for One Flew Over the Cuckoo's Nest came while Kesey was working the night shift with Gordon Lish at the Menlo Park Veterans' Hospital. There, Kesey often spent time talking to the patients, sometimes under the influence of the hallucinogenic drugs he had volunteered to experiment with. He did not believe these patients were insane, but rather that society had pushed them out because they did not fit conventional ideas of how people were supposed to act and behave. Published under Cowley's guidance in 1962, the novel was an immediate success; in 1963, it was adapted into a successful stage play by Dale Wasserman, and in 1975, Miloš Forman directed a screen adaptation, which won the "Big Five" Academy Awards: Best Picture, Best Actor (Jack Nicholson), Best Actress (Louise Fletcher), Best Director (Forman) and Best Adapted Screenplay (Lawrence Hauben and Bo Goldman).

Kesey originally was involved in the film, but left two weeks into production. He claimed never to have seen the movie because of a dispute over the $20,000 he was initially paid for the film rights. Kesey loathed that, unlike the book, the film was not narrated by Chief Bromden, and he disagreed with Jack Nicholson's casting as Randle McMurphy (he wanted Gene Hackman). Despite this, Faye Kesey has said that her husband was generally supportive of the film and pleased that it was made.

=== Merry Pranksters ===
When the 1964 publication of his second novel, Sometimes a Great Notion, required his presence in New York, Kesey, Neal Cassady, and others in a group of friends they called the Merry Pranksters took a cross-country trip in a school bus nicknamed Furthur. This trip, described in Tom Wolfe's The Electric Kool-Aid Acid Test (and later in Kesey's unproduced screenplay, The Furthur Inquiry), was the group's attempt to create art out of everyday life and to experience roadway America while high on LSD. In an interview after arriving in New York, Kesey said, "The sense of communication in this country has damn near atrophied. But we found as we went along it got easier to make contact with people. If people could just understand it is possible to be different without being a threat." A huge amount of footage was filmed on 16 mm film during the trip, which remained largely unseen until the release of Alex Gibney and Alison Elwood's 2011 film Magic Trip.

After the bus trip, the Pranksters threw parties they called Acid Tests around the San Francisco Bay Area from 1965 to 1966. Many of the Pranksters lived at Kesey's residence in La Honda. In New York, Cassady introduced Kesey to Jack Kerouac and Allen Ginsberg, who turned them on to Timothy Leary. Sometimes a Great Notion inspired a 1970 film starring and directed by Paul Newman; it was nominated for two Academy Awards, and in 1972 was the first film shown by the new television network HBO, in Wilkes-Barre, Pennsylvania.

In 1965, Kesey was arrested in La Honda for marijuana possession. In an attempt to mislead police, he faked suicide by having friends leave his truck on a cliffside road near Eureka, along with an elaborate suicide note written by the Pranksters. Kesey fled to Mexico in the back of a friend's car. He returned to the U.S. eight months later. On January 17, 1966, Kesey was sentenced to six months at the San Mateo County jail in Redwood City, California. Two nights later, he was arrested again, this time with Carolyn Adams, while smoking marijuana on the rooftop of Stewart Brand's Telegraph Hill home in San Francisco. On his release, he moved back to the family farm in Pleasant Hill, Oregon, in the Willamette Valley, where he spent the rest of his life. He wrote many articles, books (mostly collections of his articles), and short stories during that time.

=== Death of son ===
On January 23, 1984, Kesey's 20-year-old son Jed, a wrestler for the University of Oregon, suffered severe head injuries on the way to Pullman, Washington, when the team's loaned van crashed after sliding off an icy highway. Two days later at Deaconess Hospital in Spokane, he was declared brain dead and his parents gave permission for his organs to be donated.

Jed's death deeply affected Kesey, who later called Jed a victim of policies that had starved the team of funding. He wrote to Senator Mark Hatfield:

And I began to get mad, Senator. I had finally found where the blame must be laid: that the money we are spending for national defense is not defending us from the villains real and near, the awful villains of ignorance, and cancer, and heart disease and highway death. How many school buses could be outfitted with seatbelts with the money spent for one of those 16-inch shells?

At a Grateful Dead concert soon after the death of promoter Bill Graham, Kesey delivered a eulogy, mentioning that Graham had donated $1,000 toward a memorial to Jed atop Mount Pisgah, near the Kesey home in Pleasant Hill. In 1988, Kesey donated $33,395 toward the purchase of a proper bus for the school's wrestling team.

=== Final years ===
Kesey was diagnosed with diabetes in 1992. In 1994, he toured with members of the Merry Pranksters, performing a musical play he wrote about the millennium called Twister: A Ritual Reality. Many old and new friends and family showed up to support the Pranksters on this tour, which took them from Seattle's Bumbershoot all along the West Coast, including a sold-out two-night run at The Fillmore in San Francisco to Boulder, Colorado, where they coaxed the Beat Generation poet Allen Ginsberg into performing with them.

Kesey mainly kept to his home life in Pleasant Hill, preferring to make artistic contributions on the Internet or holding ritualistic revivals in the spirit of the Acid Test. In the Grateful Dead DVD The Closing of Winterland (2003) documenting the New Year's 1978/1979 concert at the Winterland Arena in San Francisco, Kesey is featured in a between-set interview.

On August 14, 1997, Kesey and his Pranksters attended a Phish concert in Darien Lake, New York. Kesey and the Pranksters appeared onstage with the band and performed a dance-trance-jam session involving several characters from The Wizard of Oz and Frankenstein.

In June 2001, Kesey was the keynote speaker at The Evergreen State College's commencement ceremony. His last major work was an essay for Rolling Stone magazine calling for peace in the aftermath of the September 11 attacks.

=== Death ===
In 1997, health problems began to take a toll on Kesey, starting with a stroke. On October 25, 2001, Kesey had surgery at Sacred Heart Medical Center in Eugene on his liver to remove a tumor; he did not recover and died of complications several weeks later on November 10 at age 66. After a public service in Eugene, his body was brought back to his farm and buried next to his son Jed.

=== Legacy ===
The film Gerry (2002) is dedicated to Kesey. In the 2025 film The Chronology of Water Kesey is portrayed by Jim Belushi.

Kesey Square is in downtown Eugene, Oregon.

== Works ==
This is a selected list of Kesey's better-known works.

- Kesey, Ken (1962). One Flew Over the Cuckoo's Nest. New York: Viking Press. OCLC 895037361.ISBN 978-0-451-16396-7.
- Kesey, Ken (1964). Sometimes a Great Notion : a novel. New York: Penguin Books. OCLC 813638027. ISBN 978-0-14-004529-1.
- Kesey, Ken (1973). Kesey's Garage Sale. New York: Viking Press. ISBN 978-0-670-41268-6. OCLC 899072134. A collection of essays
- Kesey, Ken (1986). Demon Box. New York: Penguin Books. ISBN 978-0-14-008530-3. OCLC 911911149. A collection of essays and short stories
- Levon, O. U. (1990). Caverns : a novel. Introduction by Ken Kesey. New York: Penguin Books. ISBN 978-0-14-012208-4. OCLC 20131987. "O.U. Levon" spelled backwards produces "novel U.O" This book was jointly written by a creative writing class taught by Kesey at the University of Oregon (U.O.).
- Kesey, Ken (1990). The Further Inquiry. photographs by Ron Bevirt. New York: Viking. ISBN 978-0-670-83174-6. OCLC 20758816. A play / photographic record
- Kesey, Ken (1990). Little Tricker the Squirrel Meets Big Double the Bear. illustrated by Barry Moser. New York: Viking. ISBN 978-0-670-81136-6. OCLC 21339755. A children's book
- Kesey, Ken (1992). Sailor Song. New York: Viking. ISBN 978-0-670-83521-8. OCLC 25411564. A novel
- Kesey, Ken; Babbs, Ken (1994). Last Go Round. New York: Viking. ISBN 978-0-670-84883-6. OCLC 28548975. A Western genre novel
- Kesey, Ken; Babbs, Ken (1994). Twister: A Ritual Reality in Three-Quarters Plus Overtime if Necessary. OCLC 74813266, 39040348. A play
- Kesey, Ken (2003). Kesey's Jail Journal : Cut the M************ Loose. Introduction by Ed McClanahan. New York: Viking. ISBN 978-0-670-87693-8. OCLC 52134654. An expansion of the 1967 journals that Kesey kept while incarcerated.

== See also ==
- Summer of Love
- Wavy Gravy
