= The Electric Kool-Aid Acid Test =

1968 book by Tom Wolfe

- Cover of the first US Edition
- Author: Tom Wolfe
- Language: English
- Subject: LSD, beat generation, hippies
- Publisher: Farrar Straus Giroux
- Publication date: August 1968
- Publication place: United States
- ISBN: 978-0-553-38064-4
- OCLC: 42827164

The Electric Kool-Aid Acid Test is a 1968 nonfiction book by Tom Wolfe written in the New Journalism literary style. The book presents a firsthand account of the experiences of Ken Kesey and a group of psychedelic enthusiasts, known as the Merry Pranksters, who traveled across the United States in a colorfully-painted school bus they called Furthur. Kesey and the Pranksters became famous for their use of psychedelic drugs (such as LSD) to achieve expansion of their consciousness. The book chronicles the Acid Tests (parties with LSD-laced Kool-Aid) and encounters with notable figures of the time (Hells Angels, Grateful Dead, Allen Ginsberg), and describes Kesey's exile to Mexico and his arrests.

== Plot ==
Wolfe chronicles the adventures of Ken Kesey and his group of followers. Kesey gathers a group of followers based on the allure of transcendence achievable through drugs, as well as his ability to captivate people. The group was labelled as the "Merry Pranksters" and participated in a drug-fueled lifestyle. The "Acid Tests"—parties centered around LSD (occasionally administered through Kool-Aid) and carried out with lights and noise intended to enhance the psychedelic experience—started at Kesey's house in the woods of La Honda, California.

The Pranksters eventually leave the confines of Kesey's estate and travel across the country in a bus called Furthur. The bus is driven by Neal Cassady, who was the inspiration for the character Dean Moriarty in Jack Kerouac's 1957 novel On the Road. Throughout the journey, the individuals on the bus take acid frequently. As the Merry Pranksters gain popularity, Kesey's reputation develops as well. Towards the middle of the book, Kesey is idolized as the hero of a growing counterculture. Alongside this, Kesey forms friendships with groups like the Hells Angels, and crosses paths with icons of the Beat Generation. His growing popularity provides Kesey and the Pranksters opportunities to meet other significant members of the growing counterculture, including the Grateful Dead and Allen Ginsberg, and attempt to meet with Timothy Leary. The failed meeting with Leary marks a greater failure to unite the counterculture from the East to the West coasts. This becomes one of the turning points in the book, indicating that the new generation of “hippies” had officially outpaced the old Beat Generation in style and philosophy.

In an effort to broadcast their lifestyle, the Pranksters publicize their acid experiences giving rise to the term Acid Test. They describe the goal of these parties as the pursuit of "intersubjectivity," a state beyond an individual's ego. As the Acid Tests are catching on culturally, Kesey is arrested for possession of marijuana. In an effort to avoid jail, he flees to Mexico and is joined by the Pranksters. The Pranksters struggle in Mexico and are unable to obtain the same results from their acid trips.

Kesey and some of the Pranksters return to the United States. At this point, Kesey becomes a full-blown pop culture icon as he appears on TV and radio shows, despite being wanted by the FBI. Eventually, he is located and arrested. Kesey is conditionally released as he convinces the judge that the next step of his movement is an "Acid Test Graduation," an event in which the Pranksters and other followers will attempt to achieve intersubjectivity without the use of mind-altering drugs. The planned graduation event falls flat after other San Francisco counterculture allies pull out at the last moment. Eventually, Kesey is given two sentences for two separate offenses. He is assigned to a work camp to fulfill his sentence. He moves his wife and children to Oregon and begins serving his time in the forests of California.

== Cultural significance and reception ==
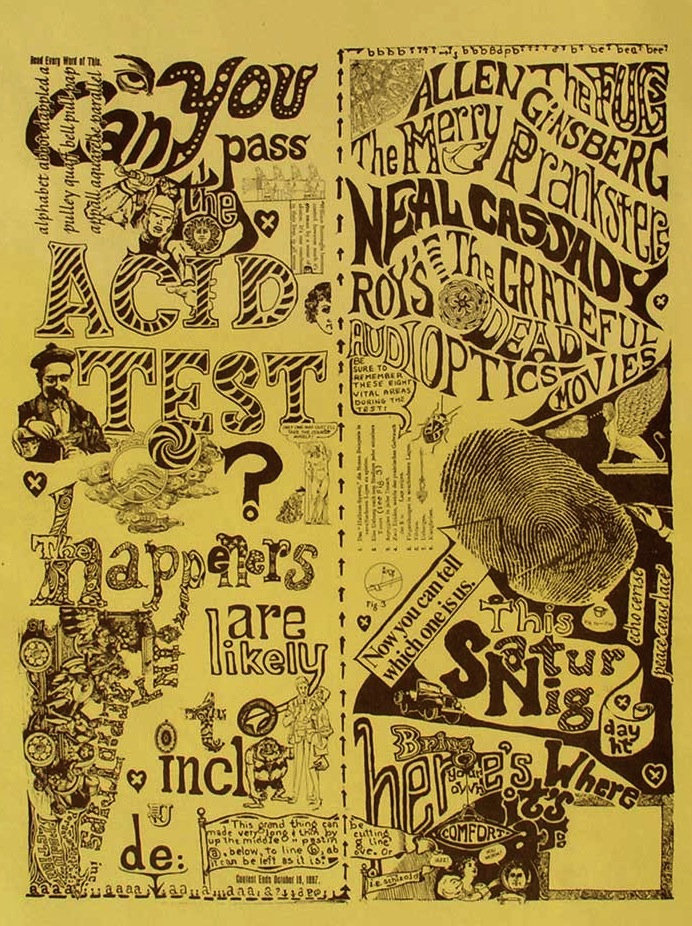
An Acid Test invitation from 1965

The Electric Kool-Aid Acid Test has been described as faithful and "essential" in depicting the roots and growth of the hippie movement.

The book received modest literary acclaim, in particular for the clear narrative Wolfe maintained amidst the indulgent and often intoxicated milieu depicted. Despite Wolfe's immersion within Kesey's "movement" and advocacy of Kesey's and the Pranksters' ideology, he renders sober portrayals of their experiences as being triggered by both paranoia and the acid trips which had become the group's cultural motif. Wolfe chronicles the Pranksters' day-to-day lives and numerous psychedelic experiences and his abstinence usefully differentiates his point of view. Wolfe endeavors to depict the Pranksters and Kesey within their environment and as he believes they themselves wished to be seen.

While some saw New Journalism as the future of literature, the concept was not without criticism. There were allegedly many who challenged the believability of the style and there were questions and criticisms about whether the accounts were true. Wolfe challenged such claims and notes that in books like The Electric Kool-Aid Acid Test, he was nearly invisible throughout the narrative. He argues that he produced an uninhibited account of the events he witnessed. Wolfe thought that this method of writing transformed the subjects of newspapers and articles into people with whom audiences could relate and sympathize.

The New York Times considered the book one of the great works of its time, and one writer described it as not only a great book about hippies, but the "essential book". The review continued to explore the dramatic impacts of Wolfe's telling of Kesey's story. Wolfe's book was said to expose counterculture norms that would soon spread across the country. The review notes that while Kesey received acclaim for his literary effort One Flew Over the Cuckoo's Nest, he was, for the most part, not a visible icon. His experiments and drug use were known within small circles, such as the Pranksters. Wolfe's accounts is said to have of Kesey and the Pranksters brought their ideologies and drug use into mainstream discussion. A separate review maintained that Wolfe's book was as vital to the hippie movement as Norman Mailer's 1968 book The Armies of the Night was to the anti-Vietnam movement.

In addition to the praise that The Electric Kool-Aid Acid Test received from some outlets, the book has received criticism for its stylistic representations of counterculture and drug use. A review in The Harvard Crimson identified the effects of the book, but did so without offering praise.

The review, written by Jay Cantor provides a more moderate description of Kesey and his Pranksters. Cantor challenges Wolfe's messiah-like depiction of Kesey, concluding that "In the end the Christ-like robes Wolfe fashioned for Kesey are much too large. We are left with another acidhead and a bunch of kooky kids who did a few krazy things." Cantor also criticizes Wolfe for failing to articulate the ethical and philosophical significance of the LSD experience itself, arguing that by the time of his review in 1969, LSD use had become widespread enough that "the ethical attributes of acid consciousness" were becoming discernible, even if Wolfe's book did not draw them out, asserting that "LSD is no respecter of persons, of individuality". However Wolfe explicitly addresses this point in his novel, writing "For that matter, there was no theology to it, no philosophy, at least not in the sense of an ism. There was no goal of an improved moral order in the world or an improved social order, nothing about salvation and certainly nothing about immortality or the life hereafter. Hereafter! That was a laugh. If there was ever a group devoted totally to the here and now it was the Pranksters."

Asked in 1989 by Terry Gross on Fresh Air what he thought of the book, Kesey replied

It's a good book. Yeah, he's a—Wolfe's a genius. He did a lot of that stuff, he was only around three weeks. He picked up that amount of dialogue and verisimilitude without a tape recorder, without taking notes to any extent. He just watches very carefully and remembers. But, you know, he's got his own editorial filter there. And so, what he's coming up with is part of me, but it's not all of me...."

=== Plans for a film adaptation ===
The project for a movie adaptation of Wolfe's book seems to have stalled. Entrepreneur Alfred Roven purchased the film rights shortly after the book was published, passing them to his children before his death, who entrusted them to Richard N. Gladstein after they were introduced to him by their attorney. Gladstein hired Gus Van Sant (who had dedicated his 2002 film Gerry to Kesey) to direct, and then Dustin Lance Black to screenwrite. Gustin Nash was later hired for rewrites. In 2011, Van Sant said that he was still working on the film, but had yet to find a way to get the project working.

In 2025, the project was revived at Sony Pictures and Atlas Entertainment.

== Censorship ==
In August 2025, the Lukashenko regime added the book to a list of printed publications containing messages whose distribution could harm the national interests of Belarus.
