= Hallucination Generation =

- Theatrical poster
- Directed by: Edward Mann
- Written by: Edward Mann
- Produced by: Nigel Fox
- Starring: George Montgomery; Danny Steinmann
- Cinematography: Francisco Sempere
- Edited by: Fima Noveck
- Music by: Bernardo Segall
- Distributed by: Trans American Films
- Release date: December 1, 1966; (United States)
- Running time: 90 minutes
- Country: United States
- Language: English

Hallucination Generation is a 1967 drama film by Edward Mann. Purportedly intended as a warning against the dangers of pill-popping 1960s hedonism along the lines of 1936's Reefer Madness, the film's primary purpose appears to have been titillation, thus landing it in the genre of exploitation cinema. It is often cited as an example of counterculture cinema.

The main setting is Francoist Spain, where a group of American expatriate beatniks are initially living carefree lives on Ibiza. Their supposed advisor and actual leader uses drugs to lure the group's members into lives of crime. A new recruit takes part in an LSD-induced crime spree which ends in the murder of an antiques dealer. The recruit subsequently seeks refuge in a monastery.

== Plot ==
The film is a drama set in Francoist Spain, where a small group of American young adults is living. The leader of the group is a drug dealer. The others are there living carefree lives as beatniks. The leader has more nefarious aims in mind, and uses drugs to lure the others into lives of crime.

George Montgomery is the psychedelic advisor to a circle of young expatriates living on the Isle of Ibiza. Visitor Danny Stone, who avoids taking part in the fun until his mother cuts off his allowance, seeks help in a monastery after an LSD-induced crime spree results in the murder of a Barcelona antiques dealer. The real world is black-and-white, the LSD trips are in color.

== Casting ==
The film features Renate Kasché, Tom Baker, Marianne Kanter, and Steve Rowland.

== Production ==
Filmed in Spain. Most of the film is in black and white, but there is a psychedelic sequence depicting the purported effects of the group using LSD which was filmed in color.

== In popular culture ==
The film inspired a 1989 song, "Hallucination Generation" by the new beat band The Gruesome Twosome.

== See also ==
- Hippie exploitation films
