= Trans American Films =

American film distribution company

Trans American Films was an American film distribution company. It was a subdisidiary of American International Pictures and was established in 1966 to distribute "art and special films" from outside producers. Its more notable releases include Shivers.

== Select films ==
Year	Title	Refs
1966	Hallucination Generation	
1967	It's a Bikini World	
1967	Teenage Rebellion (aka Mondo Teeno)	
1967	Sadismo	
1968	Macabro	
1969	The Cycle Savages	
1970	The Swappers	
1970	Witchcraft '70	
1970	I Am a Groupie (aka Groupie Girl)	
1971	Dagmar's Hot Pants	
1975	They Came from Within (aka Shivers)	
