= The Love-Ins =

1967 film by Arthur Dreifuss

- Theatrical release poster
- Directed by: Arthur Dreifuss
- Written by: Hal Collins; Arthur Dreifuss
- Produced by: Sam Katzman
- Starring: Richard Todd; James MacArthur; Susan Oliver; Mark Goddard
- Production company: Four-Leaf Productions
- Distributed by: Columbia Pictures
- Release date: July 26, 1967
- Running time: 85 minutes
- Country: United States
- Language: English

The Love-Ins is a 1967 American counterculture-era exploitation movie about LSD that was directed by Arthur Dreifuss.

The film is loosely based on the 1960s American figure Timothy Leary and represents the 1960s San Francisco scene, particularly the Haight-Ashbury district. The plot centers on a Leary-type figure becoming the head of a cult-like following of hippies who all enjoy the effects of LSD. The production seems to be a typical representation of the producer Sam Katzman's work. It featured a number of different musical acts popular at the time. The themes dealt with include drug use and martyrdom. The film was generally poorly received with a few exceptions.

== Plot ==
Patricia Cross and her boyfriend Larry Osborne, two students in a San Francisco school, become expelled for the publication of an off-campus underground paper. As a result, a philosophy professor, Dr. Jonathon Barnett, resigns his teaching position and decides to become an advocate for the counterculture youth movement and specifically the use of LSD. The hippies of the Haight-Ashbury district (including Larry and Patricia) first see him as a hero and then as something more. Dr. Barnett makes an appearance on the Joe Pyne TV show to express his support of the hippie community and the use of LSD.

One scheming young man sees the opportunity to build Dr. Barnett as the head of a cult centered on the use of LSD. He hopes to earn profit from the users, Dr. Barnett's speeches known as "happenings", and their lifestyles. At a massive LSD-fueled dance, Patricia begins to have a bad trip which leads to an argument between her and Larry, ultimately splitting up the couple.

After Patricia realizes that she is pregnant, Dr. Barnett advises her to have an abortion, ultimately leading to her attempting suicide. However, Larry saves her and makes the destruction of Dr. Barnett's cult his primary objective. Larry shoots Dr. Barnett from the crowd at one of his massive speeches. As another hippie in attendance calms the audience and Elliot sees his new leader for their cult-like organization, Larry realizes that his assassination of Dr. Barnett simply made him a martyr for the hippie movement.

== Cast ==
The cast incorporated a number of current musical acts, real-life news figure Joe Pyne, actors, as well as extras who were from the Haight-Ashbury district at the time.

- Richard Todd as Dr. Jonathan Barnett
- James MacArthur as Larry Osborne
- Susan Oliver as Patricia Cross
- Mark Goddard as Elliott
- Carol Booth as Harriet Henning
- Marc Cavell as Mario
- Janee Michelle as Lamelle
- Ronnie Eckstine as Bobby
- Michael Evans as Rev. Spencer
- Hortense Petra as Mrs. Sacaccio
- Jimmy Lloyd as Mr. Henning
- Mario Roccuzzo as Hippie on LSD
- Joe Pyne as Himself
- Donnie Brooks as Specialty Act
- The U.F.O.'s as Themselves
- The New Age as Themselves
- Bill Baldwin as Reporter (uncredited)
- Frank Coghlan Jr. as Reporter in Park (uncredited)
- Richard Hoyt as Reporter (uncredited)
- Gary Busey as Hippie with Loudspeaker (uncredited)

Actress Susan Oliver, who portrays the main character Patricia Cross, was disillusioned by the film due to its serious subject manner and the exploitation style in which it would be produced. She said, "I'd turned it down flat at first, since the script was a trivialization of the whole Timothy Leary, flower-child, hippie scene then going on." However, producers and friends involved in the picture promised her that the topic would be done tastefully. Later, she realized it was just an exploitation and cried at the wrap party.

This is Gary Busey's debut.

== Production ==
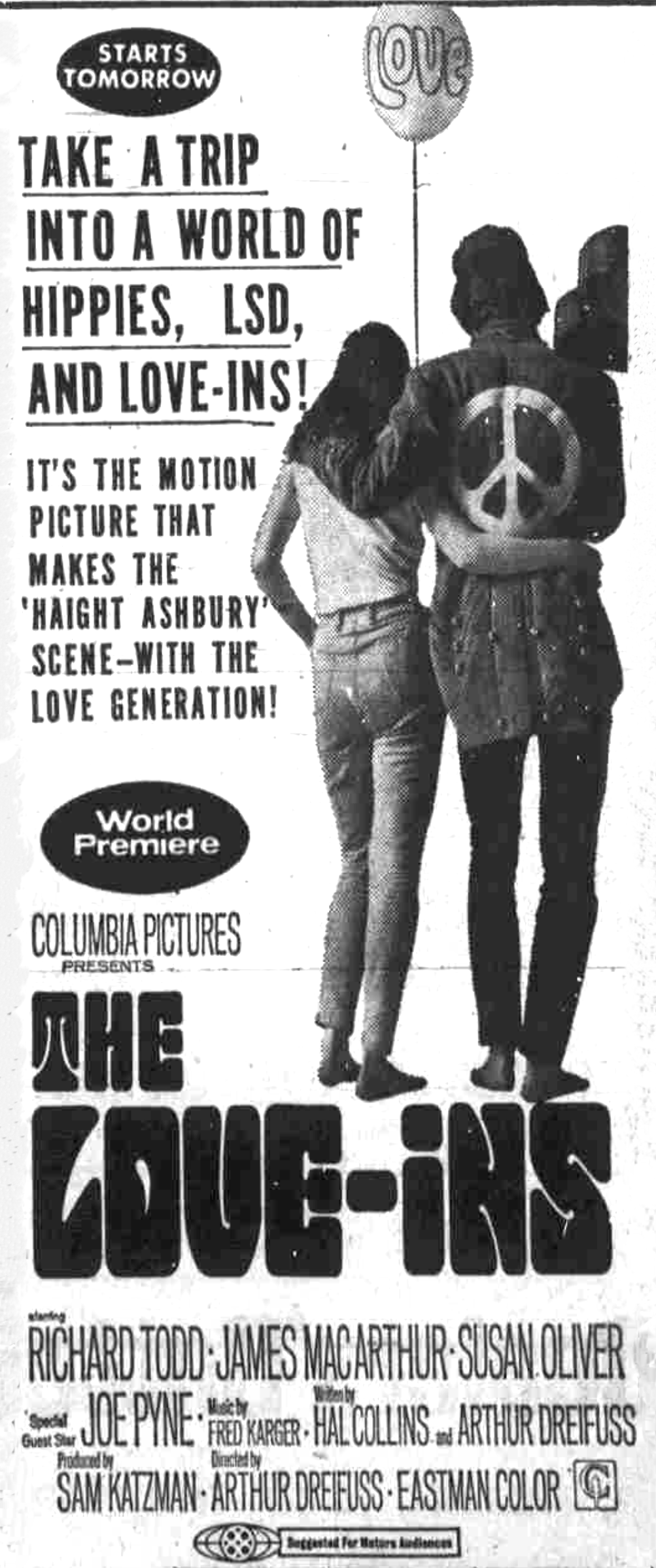
Theatrical advertisement from 1967

Columbia Pictures released the film in 1967. Sam Katzman produced the film. According to Jeff Stafford, Katzman had made a name of making cheap exploitations films in either popular genres or in relation to popular fads of the time.

Richard Todd said he received the offer to make the film shortly before filming was to begin. He spoke with Katzman and "could not believe his descriptions of the flower-children and their mass love-ins, nor the dreadful effects on their minds and bodies. In Britain we had as yet only a hazy idea of this hideous cult." Todd agreed to take the role, hoping "there was a useful message to be put over by" the film and "I wanted to work in Hollywood again and the salary would compensate for some of the losses I had recently incurred."

The movie was made for Columbia but shot at MGM studios. Todd called it "quite the most extraordinary and disturbing film I have ever been in" where "the young actors in the picture were splendid."

== The term "love-ins" ==
"Love-in" is a name given to a gathering in the promotion of love for the enjoyment of participants either personally or in relation to social activism. In the context of the title, it refers to the psychedelic and social activism conducted by Timothy Leary, who in the film is represented by the character Dr. Barnett whose philosophy is "Be more. Sense More. Love more."

== Music ==
The film featured a number of psychedelic rock bands at the time. The garage band The Chocolate Watchband made an appearance in the film as well as contributing music. The film also featured 1960s bands, such as The UFO's, Donnie Brooks and the New Age Group. Hollywood music director and composer Fred Karger also contributed original music for the film.

Although not a musical, the film does feature a large musical sequence in which a main character, Patricia Cross, has a bad LSD trip and goes into an Alice in Wonderland-themed sequence. Cross imagines that she is Alice and meets men dressed in White Rabbit costumes as well as other representations of characters from Lewis Carroll's story over the course of a lengthy, free-form, disco musical sequence.

== Themes ==
The film deals with many themes in tune with 1960s counterculture. One theme throughout the film deals with the aspect of the Haight-Ashbury district and its drug counterculture, with Dr. Barnett as the film's representation of Timothy Leary. Like Leary, Barnett endorses an LSD lifestyle. As Barnett says in the film, "LSD opens up new vistas and experiences to those that take it. I believe that every healthy person should try it. This is a way of life: Be more. Sense more. Love more." The film also showed the downfall of certain individuals as the result of such a lifestyle, in particular with the film's treatment of its protagonists Larry and Patricia.

Another theme is the creation of martyrs, reflected in the film's final act, in which Larry thinks he has destroyed the head of the cult-like following only to find a ready replacement in another hippie from the organization.

== Reception ==
Many critics dismissed the film as "a typical exploitation film." However, a few notable exceptions exist. Variety magazine called it a "good exploitation film of San Francisco's hippie movement…a solid, if standard story, fringed in fine style with love-ins and hippie happenings…art direction is slick and colorful."

According to Todd the film "did good business and caused a considerable stir amongst its audiences" in the US but was banned from being shown in Britain.

== See also ==
- List of American films of 1967
- Hippie exploitation films
