= Hippie exploitation films =

Film genre

Hippie exploitation films are late 1960s-early-to-late 1970s exploitation films about the hippie counterculture with situations associated with the movement such as marijuana and LSD use, sex and wild psychedelic parties.

== Overview ==
From almost the beginning, Hollywood and independent studios got in on the action and produced a number of extremely lurid hippie exploitation (and/or hippie horror) films that were either supporting the subversive playful artistic side of the culture war, or masquerading as cautionary public service announcements, but which were in fact aimed directly at feeding a morbid public appetite while pretending to take a moral stance.

Often depicting drug-crazed hippies living and freaking out in "Manson family" style communes, such films as The Hallucination Generation (1967) and Riot on Sunset Strip (1967) depicted "hippie" youths running wild in an orgy of group sex, drugs, crime and even murder." Other examples include The Love-ins, Psych-Out, The Trip, and Wild in the Streets.

== Notable examples ==
- The Wild Angels (1966)
- Hallucination Generation (1967)
- Riot on Sunset Strip (1967)
- The Love-Ins (1967)
- The Trip (1967)
- I Love You, Alice B. Toklas (1968)
- Psych-Out (1968)
- Revolution (1968)
- Wild in the Streets (1968)
- The Big Cube (1969)
- Eggshells (1969)
- I Drink Your Blood (1970)
- Joe (1970)
- Woodstock (1970)
- The Night God Screamed (1971)
- Thumb Tripping (1972)
- Helter Skelter (1976)
- Hair (1979)

=== Filmmakers associated with hippie exploitation ===
- John G. Avildsen
- Roger Corman
- Wes Craven
- Tobe Hooper
- Richard Rush

== See also ==
- List of films related to the hippie subculture
- New Hollywood
- Extreme cinema
