= Ronnie Eckstine =

American actor

Ron Eckstine (born 1946) is a former actor and music manager, and stepson of singer Billy Eckstine by way of Billy's marriage to Ronnie's mother, Carolle Drake.

== Early life ==
He played high school football at Birmingham High School, where he and his older brother Kenny were the only African American students, and attended the University of California, Los Angeles.

== Career ==
He was conscripted into military service in 1965. Six months after he completed his service, and with dramatic training by Lillian Randolph, Eckstine made his acting debut in the 1967 film The Love-Ins.

He appeared in the TV movie Shadow on the Land (1968), an adaptation of Sinclair Lewis's novel It Can't Happen Here, and had guest roles in the television series Room 222 and Cannon.

In the 1970s, he organized and managed a six-person teen vocal group, Spicegarden, with Laddie Chapman as the musical director. In the 1980s, Eckstine began promoting concerts and managing disco and other dance music groups and by the late 1990s had established Ron Eckstine Management, based in Beverly Hills.

== Escape ==
In February 1984, after Eckstine was arrested on charges of forgery and evasion of arrest, he escaped from jail the following month by exchanging identification bracelets with another prisoner and leaving on that prisoner's bail. Eckstine's family then issued a press release asking the Los Angeles Police Department to be discreet in their attempts to recapture him.

== Personal life ==
Eckstine met singer Leslie Uggams in June 1964 while she was performing at the Flamingo in Las Vegas and the two started dating. Uggams announced her engagement to Eckstine the following month while she was performing in Australia. When Eckstine was conscripted into military service, Uggams left him for Grahame Pratt, a European Australian man whom she married in 1965.

== See also ==
- List of fugitives from justice who disappeared
