= Hippie =

1960s subculture

- Years active: 1960s–1970s/present
- Country: United States (origins); Other western countries
- Major figures: Abbie Hoffman, Jerry Rubin, Timothy Leary, Allen Ginsberg, William S. Burroughs, Jack Kerouac and The Beatles
- Influences: Primarily the 1960s counterculture including: the British Invasion and the peacock revolution, the Beat Generation, Wandervogel, hipsters and other earlier bohemian subcultures
- Influenced: The New Left including: the Yippies, the modern gay liberation/LGBTQ movements and the modern feminist/women's liberation movement, the New Age including: new travellers, wiccans and other new religious movements, and other modern youth subcultures

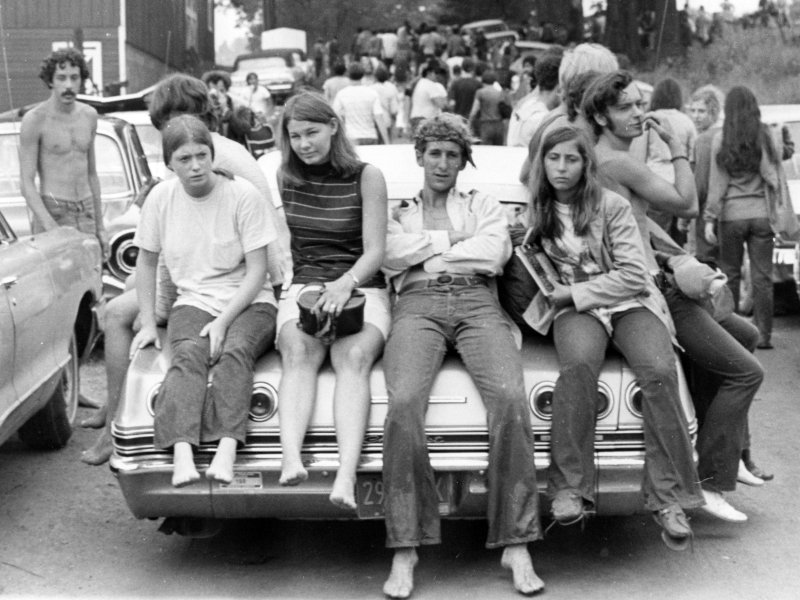
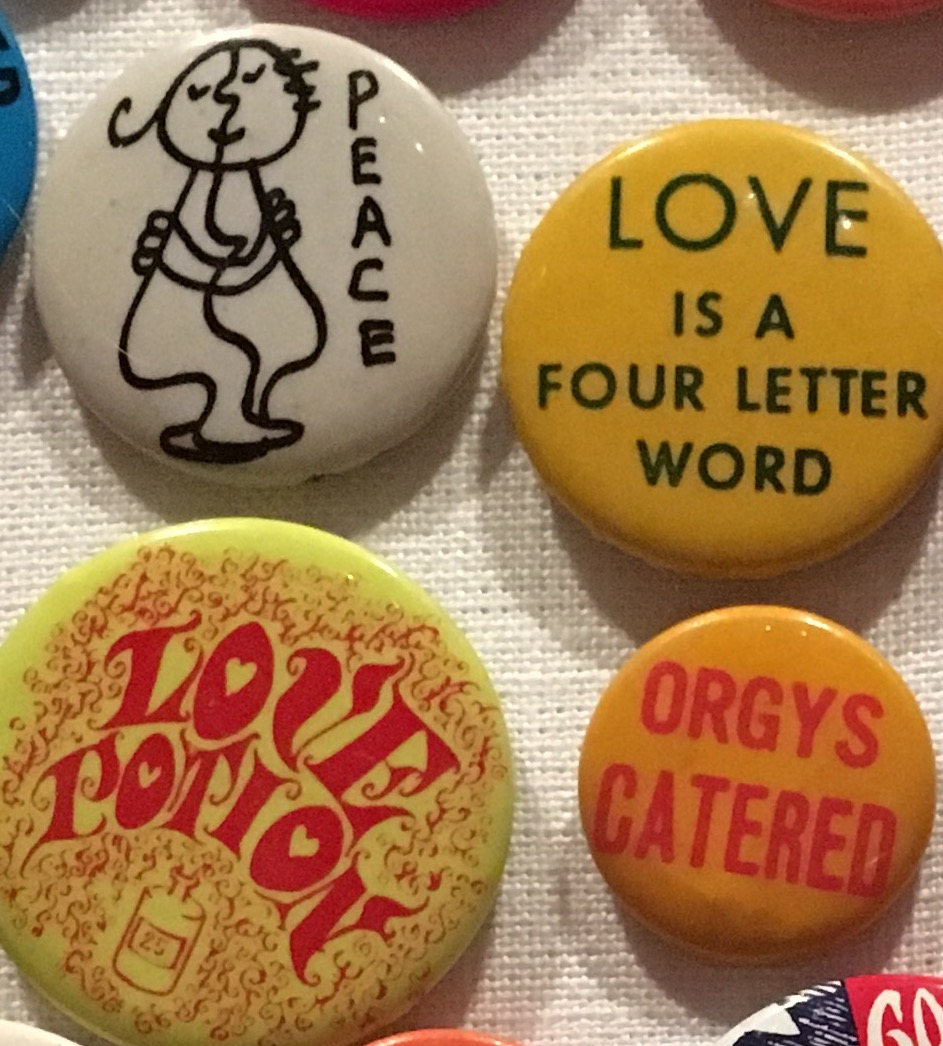
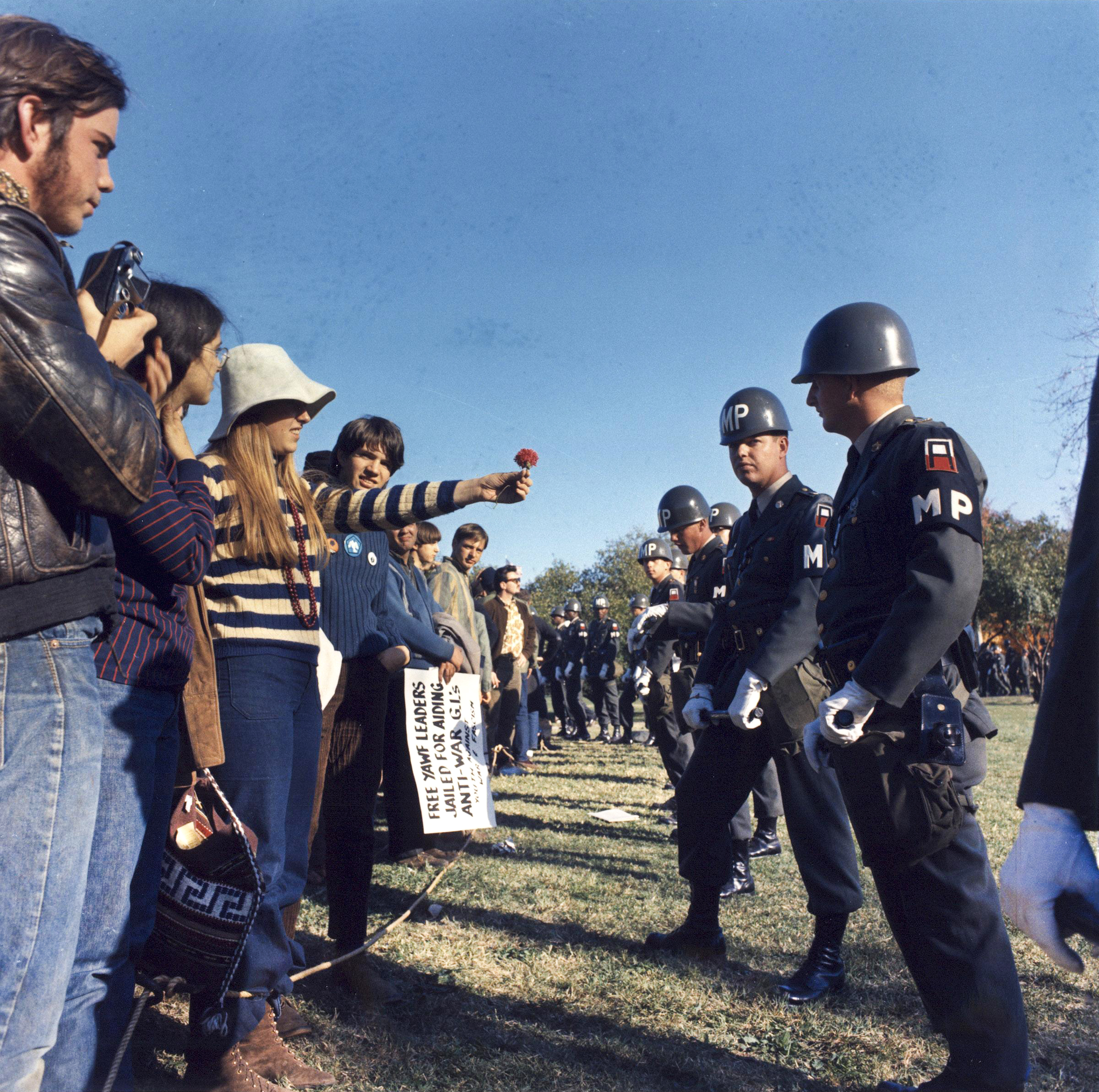
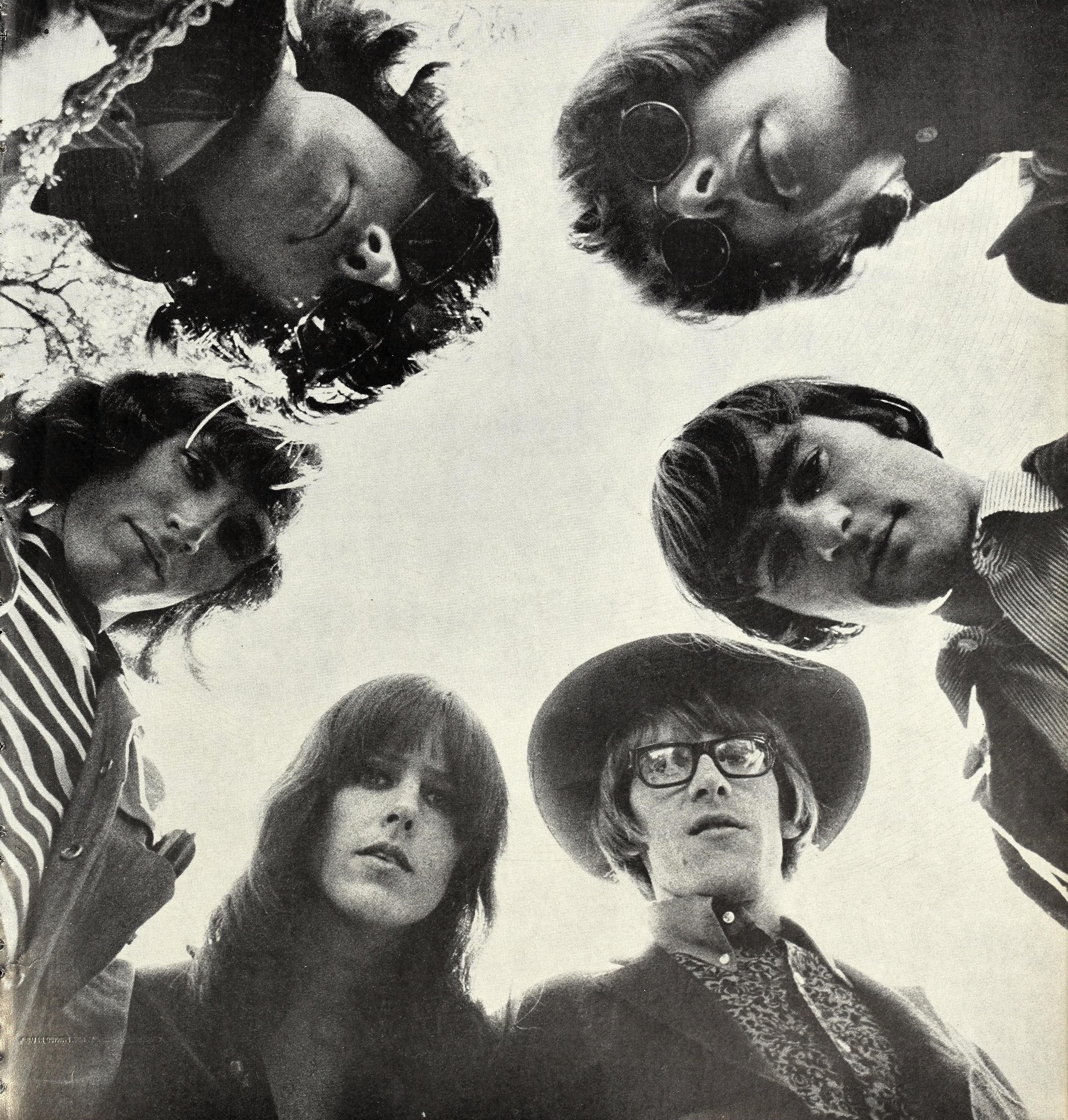
Clockwise from top:
Young people near the Woodstock music festival in August 1969; Button pins from the sexual revolution; Jefferson Airplane on the cover of Cash Box in 1967; An anti-war demonstrator offers a flower to a Military Police officer during the National Mobilization Committee to End the War in Vietnam's 1967 March on the Pentagon.

A hippie (also spelled hippy in British English) is a subculture associated with the counterculture of the mid-1960s to early 1970s. It originated as a youth subculture that began in the United States and spread to different countries around the world. The word hippie came from hipster and was used to describe beatniks who moved into New York City's Greenwich Village, San Francisco's Haight-Ashbury district, Los Angeles' Laurel Canyon, and Chicago's Old Town community. The term hippie was used in print by San Francisco writer Michael Fallon, helping popularize use of the term in the media, although the tag was seen elsewhere earlier.

The origins of the terms hip and hep are uncertain. By the 1940s, both had become part of African American jive slang and meant "sophisticated; currently fashionable; fully up-to-date". The Beats adopted the term hip, and early hippies adopted the language and countercultural values of the Beat Generation. Hippies created their own communities, listened to psychedelic music, embraced the sexual revolution, and many used drugs such as marijuana and LSD to explore altered states of consciousness.

In 1967, the Human Be-In in Golden Gate Park, San Francisco, and the Monterey International Pop Festival popularized hippie culture, leading to the Summer of Love on the West Coast of the United States, and the 1969 Woodstock Festival on the East Coast. Hippies in Mexico, known as jipitecas, formed La Onda (the Wave) and gathered at Avándaro, while in New Zealand, nomadic housetruckers practiced alternative lifestyles and promoted sustainable energy at Nambassa. In the United Kingdom in 1970, many gathered at the gigantic third Isle of Wight Festival with a crowd of around 400,000 people. In later years, mobile "peace convoys" of New Age travellers made summer pilgrimages to free music festivals at Stonehenge and elsewhere. In Australia, hippies gathered at Nimbin for the 1973 Aquarius Festival and the annual Cannabis Law Reform Rally or MardiGrass. "Piedra Roja Festival", a major hippie event in Chile, was held in 1970. Hippie and psychedelic culture influenced 1960s to mid 1970s teenager and youth culture in Iron Curtain countries in Eastern Europe (see Mánička).

Hippie fashion and values had a major effect on culture, influencing popular music, television, film, literature, and the arts. Since the 1960s, mainstream society has assimilated many aspects of hippie culture. The religious and cultural diversity the hippies espoused has gained widespread acceptance, and their pop versions of Eastern philosophy and Asiatic spiritual concepts have reached a larger group. Those who participated in the hippie movement at its height were those born during or shortly after World War II, during the 1940s and early 1950s. These were the youngest of the Silent Generation and oldest of the Baby Boomers; the former who were the actual leaders of the movement as well as the early pioneers of rock music.

== Etymology ==
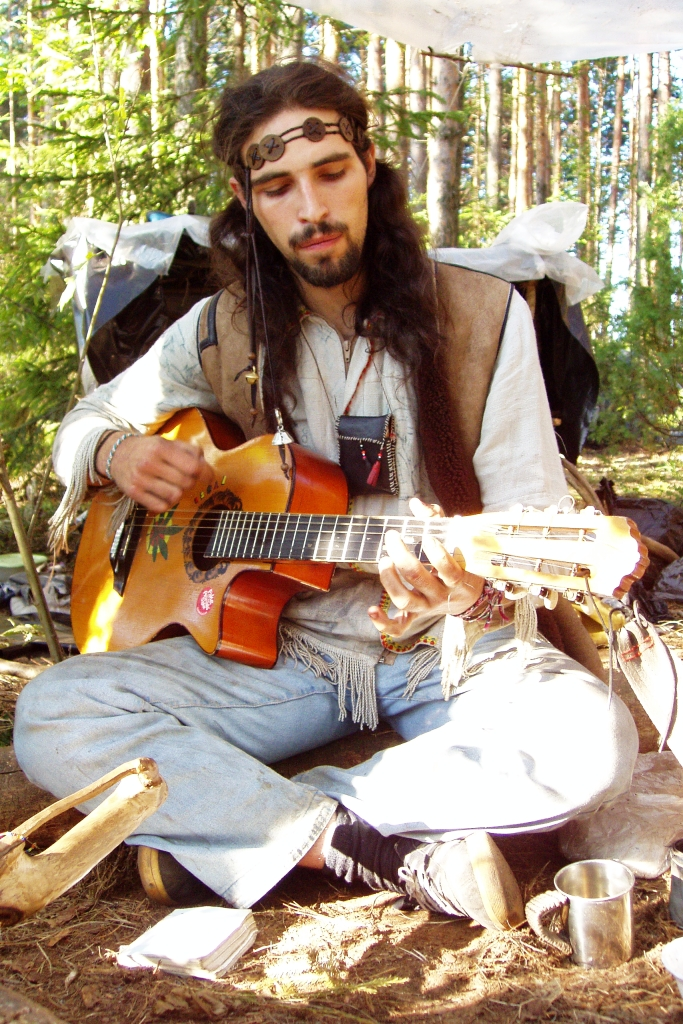
Contemporary hippie at the Rainbow Gathering in Russia, 2005

Lexicographer Jesse Sheidlower, the principal American editor of the Oxford English Dictionary, argues that the terms hipster and hippie are derived from the word hip, whose origins are unknown. The word hip in the sense of "aware, in the know" is first attested in a 1902 cartoon by Tad Dorgan, and first appeared in prose in a 1904 novel by George Vere Hobart (1867–1926), Jim Hickey: A Story of the One-Night Stands, where an African-American character uses the slang phrase "Are you hip?"

The term hipster was coined by Harry Gibson in 1944. By the 1940s, the terms hip, hep and hepcat were popular in Harlem jazz slang, although hep eventually came to denote an inferior status to hip. In Greenwich Village in the early 1960s, New York City, young counterculture advocates were named hips because they were considered "in the know" or "cool", as opposed to being square, meaning conventional and old-fashioned. In the April 27, 1961 issue of The Village Voice, "An open letter to JFK & Fidel Castro", Norman Mailer utilizes the term hippies, in questioning JFK's behavior. In a 1961 essay, Kenneth Rexroth used both the terms hipster and hippies to refer to young people participating in black American or Beatnik nightlife. According to Malcolm X's 1964 autobiography, the word hippie in 1940s Harlem had been used to describe a specific type of white man who "acted more Negro than Negroes". Andrew Loog Oldham refers to "all the Chicago hippies", seemingly about black blues/R&B musicians, in his rear sleeve notes to the 1965 LP The Rolling Stones, Now!

Although the word hippies made other isolated appearances in print during the early 1960s, the first use of the term on the West Coast appeared in the article "A New Paradise for Beatniks" (in the San Francisco Examiner, issue of September 5, 1965) by San Francisco journalist Michael Fallon. In that article, Fallon wrote about the Blue Unicorn Cafe (coffeehouse) (located at 1927 Hayes Street in the Haight-Ashbury district of San Francisco), using the term hippie to refer to the new generation of beatniks who had moved from North Beach into the Haight-Ashbury district.

The hippie movement in the United States began as a youth movement. Composed mostly of white teenagers and young adults between 15 and 25 years old, hippies inherited a tradition of cultural dissent from bohemians and beatniks of the Beat Generation in the late 1950s. Beats like Allen Ginsberg crossed over from the beat movement and became fixtures of the burgeoning hippie and anti-war movements. By 1965, hippies had become an established social group in the U.S., and the movement eventually expanded to other countries, extending as far as the United Kingdom and Europe, Australia, Canada, New Zealand, Japan, Mexico, and Brazil. The hippie ethos influenced the Beatles and others in the United Kingdom and other parts of Europe, and they in turn influenced their American counterparts. Hippie culture spread worldwide through a fusion of rock music, folk, blues, and psychedelic rock; it also found expression in literature, the dramatic arts, fashion, and the visual arts, including film, posters advertising rock concerts, and album covers. In 1968, "core visible hippies" represented just under 0.2% of the U.S. population and dwindled away by the mid-1970s.

Along with the New Left and the Civil Rights Movement, the hippie movement was one of three dissenting groups of the 1960s counterculture. Hippies rejected established institutions, criticized middle class values, opposed nuclear weapons and the Vietnam War, embraced aspects of Eastern philosophy, championed sexual liberation, were often vegetarian and eco-friendly, promoted the use of psychedelic drugs which they believed expanded one's consciousness, and created intentional communities or communes. They used alternative arts, street theatre, folk music, and psychedelic rock as a part of their lifestyle and as a way of expressing their feelings, their protests, and their vision of the world and life. Hippies opposed political and social orthodoxy, choosing a gentle and nondoctrinaire ideology that favored peace, love, and personal freedom, expressed for example in the Beatles' song "All You Need is Love". Hippies perceived the dominant culture as a corrupt, monolithic entity that exercised undue power over their lives, calling this culture "the Establishment", "Big Brother", or "the Man". Noting that they were "seekers of meaning and value", scholars like Timothy Miller have described hippies as a new religious movement.

== History ==
=== Precursors ===
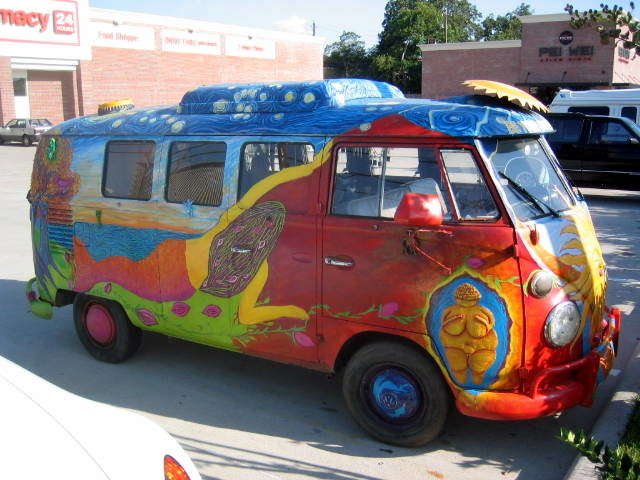
A 1967 VW Kombi bus decorated with hand-painting

A July 1967 Time magazine study on hippie philosophy credited the foundation of the hippie movement with historical precedent as far back as the sadhu of India, the spiritual seekers who had renounced the world and materialistic pursuits by taking Sannyasa. Even the counterculture of the Ancient Greeks, espoused by philosophers like Diogenes of Sinope and the cynics were also early forms of hippie culture. It also named as notable influences the religious and spiritual teachings of Buddha, Hillel the Elder, Jesus, St. Francis of Assisi, Henry David Thoreau, Gandhi and J. R. R. Tolkien.

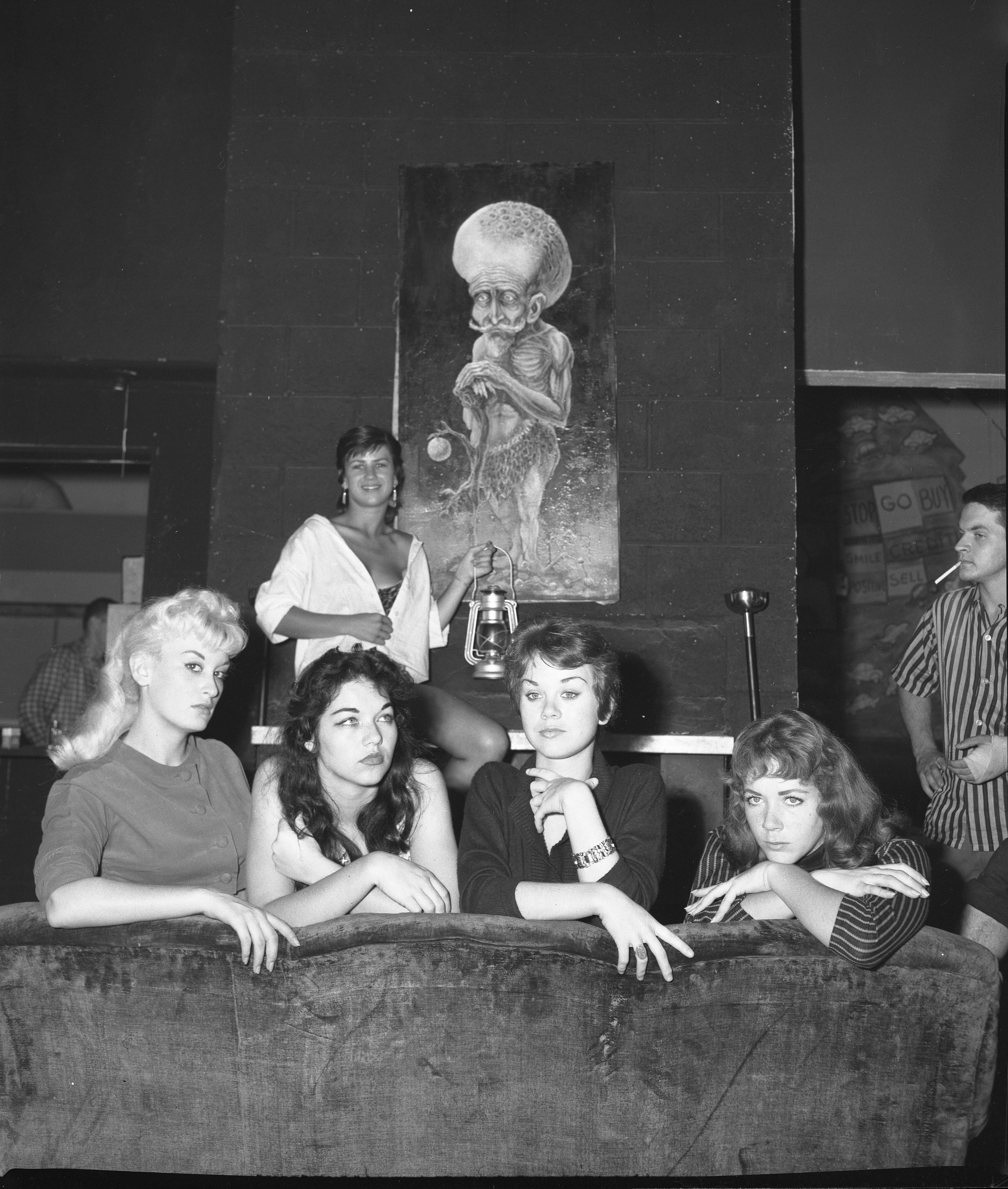
Beatniks posing in front of a piece of beatnik art, 1959. The Beat Generation are seen as a predecessor to the hippie movement

The first signs of modern "proto-hippies" emerged at the end of the 19th century in Europe. Late 1890s to early 1900s, a German youth movement arose as a countercultural reaction to the organized social and cultural clubs that centered on "German folk music". Known as Der Wandervogel ("wandering bird"), this hippie movement opposed the formality of traditional German clubs, instead emphasizing folk music and singing, creative dress, and outdoor life involving hiking and camping. Inspired by the works of Goethe, Friedrich Nietzsche, and Hermann Hesse, Wandervogel attracted thousands of young Germans who rejected the rapid trend toward urbanization and yearned for the pagan, back-to-nature spiritual life of their ancestors. During the first several decades of the 20th century, Germans settled around the United States, bringing the values of this German youth culture. Some opened the first health food stores, and many moved to southern California where they introduced an alternative lifestyle. One group, called the "Nature Boys", took to the California desert and raised organic food, espousing a back-to-nature lifestyle like the Wandervogel. In 1948, songwriter eden ahbez wrote a hit song called "Nature Boy" sang by Nat King Cole and inspired by Robert Bootzin (Gypsy Boots), who helped popularize health-consciousness, yoga, and organic food in the United States.

=== 1958–1965: Origins ===
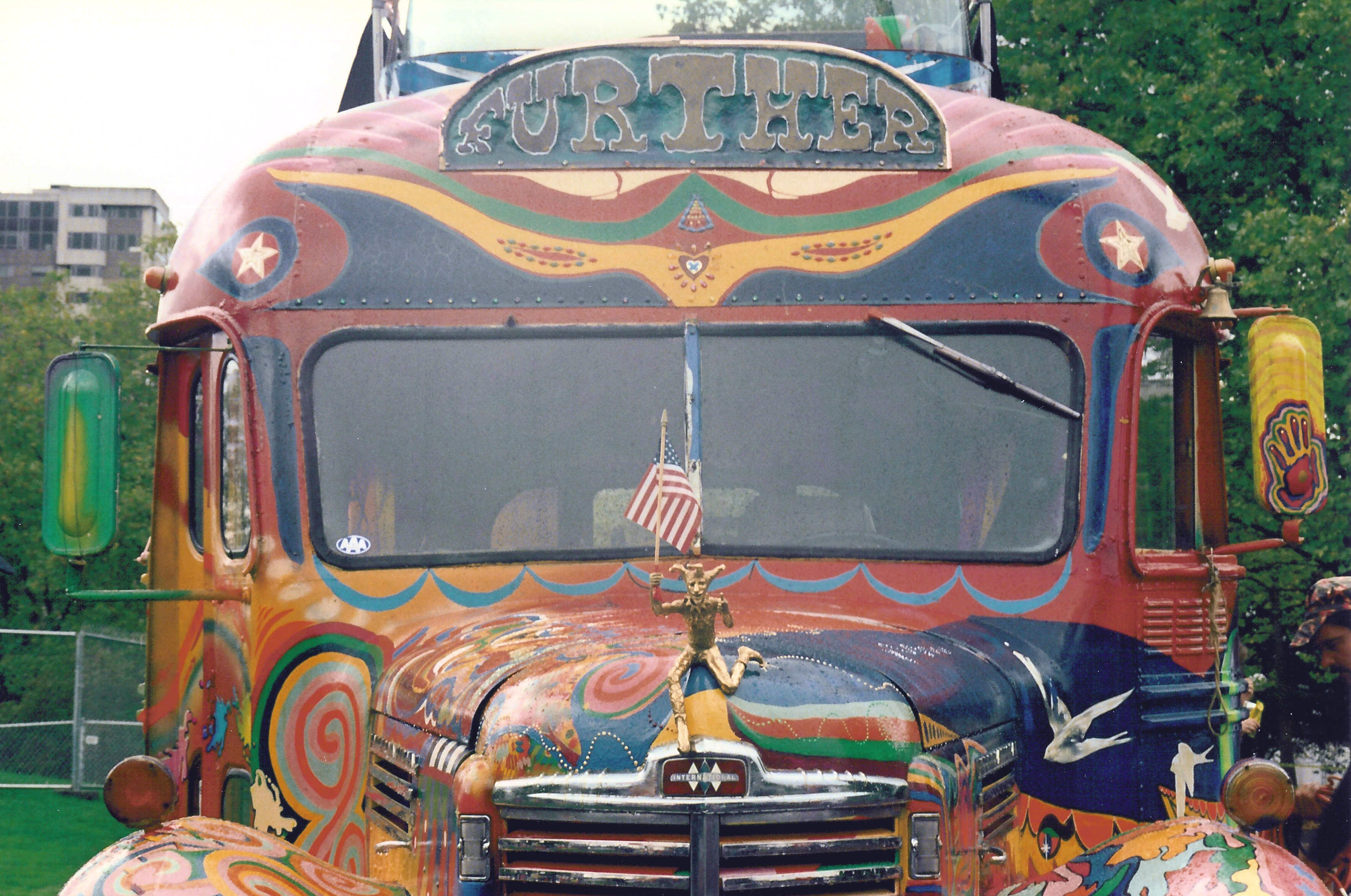
Escapin' through the lily fields I came across an empty space It trembled and exploded Left a bus stop in its place The bus came by and I got on That's when it all began There was cowboy Neal At the wheel Of a bus to never-ever land – Grateful Dead, lyrics from "That's It for the Other One"

During the late 1950s and early 1960s, novelist Ken Kesey and the Merry Pranksters lived communally first in Oregon and after the 1962 success of his novel One Flew Over the Cuckoo's Nest in his San Francisco villa. Members included Beat Generation hero Neal Cassady, Ken Babbs, Carolyn Adams (aka Mountain Girl/Carolyn Garcia), Stewart Brand, Del Close, Paul Foster, George Walker, Sandy Lehmann-Haupt and others. Their adventures were documented in Tom Wolfe's book The Electric Kool-Aid Acid Test. With Cassady at the wheel of a school bus named Furthur, the Merry Pranksters traveled across the United States to celebrate the publication of Kesey's novel Sometimes a Great Notion and to visit the 1964 World's Fair in New York City. The Merry Pranksters were known for using cannabis, amphetamine, and LSD, and during their journey they "turned on" many people to these drugs. The Merry Pranksters filmed and audio-taped their bus trips, creating an immersive multimedia experience that would later be presented to the public in the form of festivals and concerts. The Grateful Dead wrote a song about the Merry Pranksters' bus trips called "That's It for the Other One".

In 1960, eden ahbez released the exotica album "Eden's Island", ahbez had previously written the song "Nature Boy" (1948) inspired by the Californian "Nature Boys" and the work of Robert Bootzin. In 1961, painter, sculptor and former marathon dancing champion Vito Paulekas and his wife Szou established a clothing boutique on the corner of Laurel Avenue and Beverly Boulevard in Hollywood, close to Laurel Canyon. The boutique was credited with being one of the first to introduce "hippie" fashion as well as a brand of free-form dancing that would become associated with hippie culture. Paulekas and his later associate Carl Franzoni (known as "Captain Fuck") were known for their sexual appetites and unconventional behavior. They and an expanding troupe of associates called themselves "freaks" or "freakers", and became well known in the area by about 1963 for their eccentric free-form dancing in Sunset Strip nightclubs, being described as "an acid-drenched extended family of brain-damaged cohabitants". Vito has been regarded as an early hippie, he provided rehearsal space for local bands such as the Byrds in 1964 and later Love. His antics which included invading local rock concerts with his dance troupe, helped bring attention to several West Coast groups. Vito and his dancers would pioneer a style of which would become popular amongst hippies. Paulekas and his troupe would later accompany the Byrds on a nationwide tour in July 1965. He would be retroactively described as "a man in his fifties who presided over a harem of predominantly young female 'freakers'". Writing in 2003, writer Barry Miles labeled Vito and his wife Szou as "the first hippies in Hollywood" and "perhaps the first hippies anywhere".

During this period Greenwich Village in New York City and Berkeley, California anchored the American folk music circuit. Berkeley's two coffee houses, "the Cabale Creamery" and "the Jabberwock", sponsored performances by folk music artists in a beat setting.

In April 1963, Chandler A. Laughlin III, co-founder of the Cabale Creamery, established a kind of tribal, family identity among approximately fifty people who attended a traditional, all-night Native American peyote ceremony in a rural setting. This ceremony combined a psychedelic experience with traditional Native American spiritual values; these people went on to sponsor a unique genre of musical expression and performance at the "Red Dog Saloon" in the isolated, old-time mining town of Virginia City, Nevada.

=== 1965–1967: Rise to prevalence ===
During the summer of 1965, Laughlin recruited much of the original talent that led to a unique amalgam of traditional folk music and the developing psychedelic rock scene. He and his cohorts created at this very place what became known as "The Red Dog Experience", featuring previously unknown musical acts—Grateful Dead, Jefferson Airplane, Big Brother and the Holding Company, Quicksilver Messenger Service, the Charlatans, and others—who played in the completely refurbished, intimate setting of Nevada, Virginia City's "Red Dog Saloon". There was no clear delineation between "performers" and "audience" in "The Red Dog Experience", during which music, psychedelic experimentation, a unique sense of personal style, and Bill Ham's first primitive light shows combined to create a new sense of community. Laughlin and George Hunter of the Charlatans were true "proto-hippies", with their long hair, boots, and outrageous clothing of 19th-century American (and Native American) heritage. LSD manufacturer Owsley Stanley lived in Berkeley during 1965 and provided much of the LSD that became a seminal part of the "Red Dog Experience", the early evolution of psychedelic rock and budding hippie culture. At the "Red Dog Saloon", the Charlatans were the first psychedelic rock band to play live (albeit unintentionally) loaded on LSD.

When they returned to San Francisco, "Red Dog" participants Luria Castell, Ellen Harman and Alton Kelley created a collective called "the Family Dog." Modeled on their "Red Dog experiences", on October 16, 1965, the "Family Dog" hosted "A Tribute to Dr. Strange" at Longshoreman's Hall. Attended by approximately one thousand of the Bay Area's original "hippies", this was San Francisco's first psychedelic rock performance, costumed dance and light show, featuring Jefferson Airplane, the Great Society and the Marbles. Two other events followed before year's end, one at "California Hall" and one at "the Matrix". After the first three "Family Dog" events, a much larger psychedelic event occurred at San Francisco's "Longshoreman's Hall". Called the "Trips Festival", it took place on January 21 – 23, 1966, and was organized by Stewart Brand, Ken Kesey, Owsley Stanley and others. Ten thousand people attended this sold-out event, with a thousand more turned away each night. On Saturday January 22, the Grateful Dead and Big Brother and the Holding Company came on stage, and six thousand people arrived to imbibe punch spiked with LSD and to witness one of the first fully developed light shows of the era.

It is nothing new. We have a private revolution going on. A revolution of individuality and diversity that can only be private. Upon becoming a group movement, such a revolution ends up with imitators rather than participants...It is essentially a striving for realization of one's relationship to life and other people...

— Bob Stubbs, "Unicorn Philosophy"

By February 1966, the "Family Dog" became "Family Dog Productions" under organizer Chet Helms, promoting happenings at the Avalon Ballroom and the Fillmore Auditorium in initial cooperation with Bill Graham. The Avalon Ballroom, the Fillmore Auditorium, and other venues provided settings where participants could partake of the full psychedelic music experience. Bill Ham, who had pioneered the original "Red Dog" light shows, perfected his art of liquid light projection, which combined light shows and film projection and became synonymous with the "San Francisco ballroom experience". The sense of style and costume that began at the "Red Dog Saloon" flourished when San Francisco's Fox Theater went out of business and hippies bought up its costume stock, reveling in the freedom to dress up for weekly musical performances at their favorite ballrooms. As San Francisco Chronicle music columnist Ralph J. Gleason put it, "They danced all night long, orgiastic, spontaneous and completely free form."

Some of the earliest San Francisco hippies were former students at San Francisco State College who became intrigued by the developing psychedelic hippie music scene. These students joined the bands they loved, living communally in the large, inexpensive Victorian apartments in the Haight-Ashbury. Young Americans around the country began moving to San Francisco, and by June 1966, around 15,000 hippies had moved into the Haight. the Charlatans, Jefferson Airplane, Big Brother and the Holding Company, and the Grateful Dead all moved to San Francisco's Haight-Ashbury neighborhood during this period. Activity centered on the Diggers, a guerrilla street theatre group that combined spontaneous street theatre, anarchistic action, and art happenings in their agenda to create a "free city". By late 1966, the Diggers opened free stores which simply gave away their stock, provided free food, distributed free drugs, gave away money, organized free music concerts, and performed works of political art.

On October 6, 1966, the state of California declared LSD a controlled substance, which made the drug illegal. In response to the criminalization of LSD, San Francisco hippies staged a gathering in the Golden Gate Park panhandle, called the Love Pageant Rally, attracting an estimated 700–800 people. As explained by Allan Cohen, co-founder of the San Francisco Oracle, the purpose of the rally was twofold: to draw attention to the fact that LSD had just been made illegal—and to demonstrate that people who used LSD were not criminals, nor were they mentally ill. The Grateful Dead played, and some sources claim that LSD was consumed at the rally. According to Cohen, those who took LSD "were not guilty of using illegal substances...We were celebrating transcendental consciousness, the beauty of the universe, the beauty of being."

In West Hollywood, California, the Sunset Strip curfew riots, also known as the "hippie riots", were a series of early counterculture-era clashes that took place between police and young people in 1966 and continuing on and off through the early 1970s. In 1966, annoyed residents and business owners in the district had encouraged the passage of strict (10:00 p.m.) curfew and loitering laws to reduce the traffic congestion resulting from crowds of young club patrons. This was perceived by young, local rock music fans as an infringement on their civil rights, and on Saturday, November 12, 1966, fliers were distributed along the Strip inviting people to demonstrate later that day. Hours before the protest one of the rock 'n' roll radio stations in L.A. announced there would be a rally at Pandora's Box, a club at the corner of Sunset Boulevard and Crescent Heights, and cautioned people to tread carefully. The Los Angeles Times reported that as many as 1,000 youthful demonstrators, including such celebrities as Jack Nicholson and Peter Fonda (who was afterward handcuffed by police), erupted in protest against the perceived repressive enforcement of these recently invoked curfew laws. This incident provided the basis for the 1967 low-budget teen exploitation film Riot on Sunset Strip, and inspired multiple songs including the famous Buffalo Springfield song "For What It's Worth".

=== 1967: Human Be-In, Summer of Love, and popularity surge ===
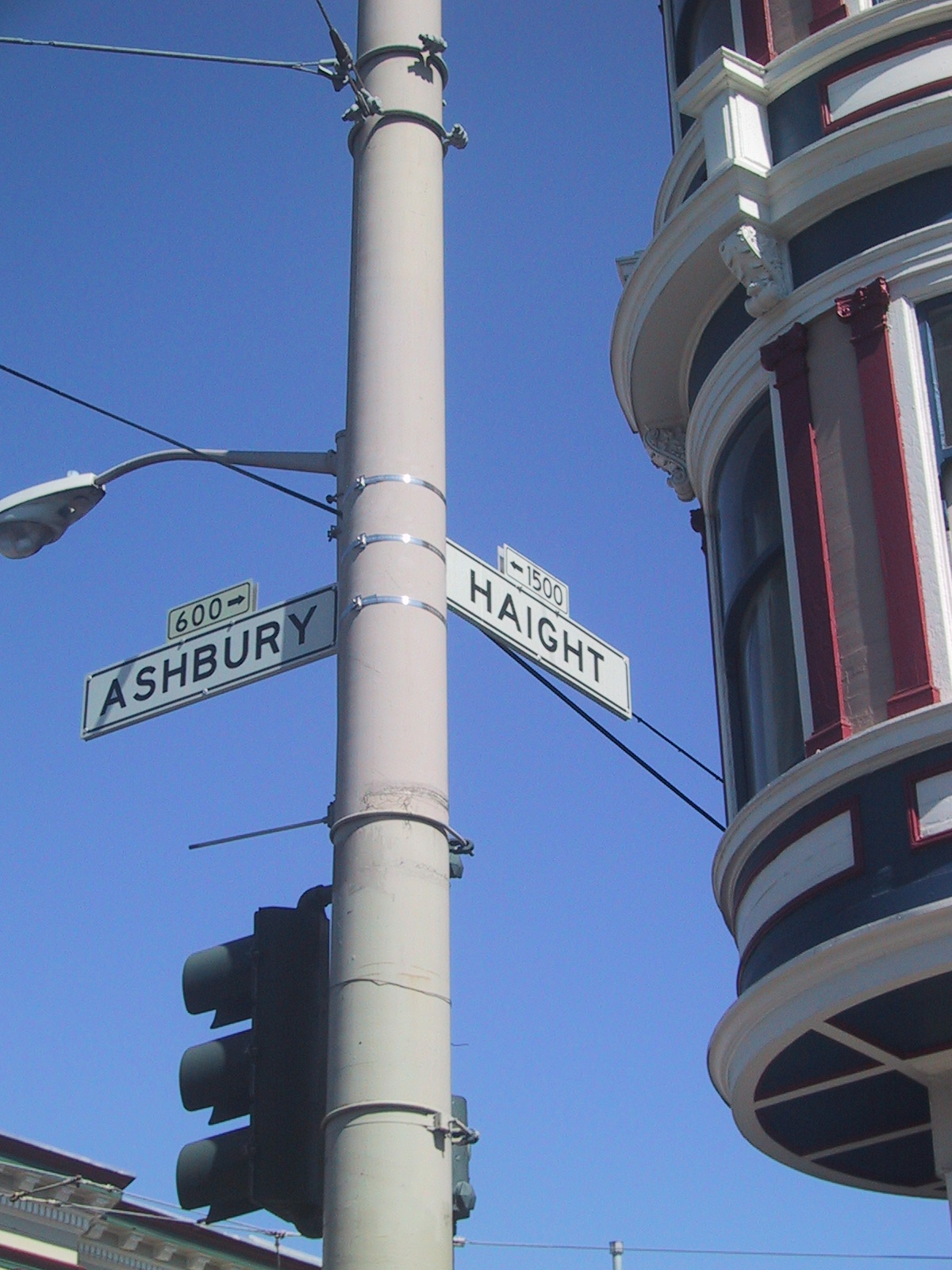
Junction of Haight and Ashbury Streets, San Francisco, celebrated as the central location of the Summer of Love

On January 14, 1967, the outdoor Human Be-In organized by Michael Bowen helped to popularize hippie culture across the United States, with 20,000 to 30,000 hippies gathering in San Francisco's Golden Gate Park.

On March 26, 1967, Lou Reed, Edie Sedgwick and 10,000 hippies came together in Manhattan for the Central Park Be-In on Easter Sunday.

The KFRC Fantasy Fair and Magic Mountain Music Festival from June 10–11, and the Monterey Pop Festival from June 16–18, introduced the music of the counterculture - and the new concept of a rock festival - to a wide audience, and marked the start of the "Summer of Love".

Scott McKenzie's rendition of John Phillips' song "San Francisco" became a hit in the United States and Europe. The lyrics, "If you're going to San Francisco, be sure to wear some flowers in your hair", inspired thousands of young people from all over the world to travel to San Francisco, sometimes wearing flowers in their hair and distributing flowers to passersby, earning them the name "Flower Children". Bands like the Grateful Dead, Big Brother and the Holding Company (with Janis Joplin), and Jefferson Airplane lived in the Haight.

According to the hippies, LSD was the glue that held the Haight together. It was the hippie sacrament, a mind detergent capable of washing away years of social programming, a re-imprinting device, a consciousness-expander, a tool that would push us up the evolutionary ladder.

— Jay Stevens

In June 1967, Herb Caen was approached by "a distinguished magazine" to write about why hippies were attracted to San Francisco. He declined the assignment but interviewed hippies in the Haight for his own newspaper column in the San Francisco Chronicle. Caen determined that, "Except in their music, they couldn't care less about the approval of the straight world." Caen himself felt that the city of San Francisco was so straight that it provided a visible contrast with hippie culture.

On July 7, 1967 Time magazine featured a cover story entitled "The Hippies: The Philosophy of a Subculture." The article described the guidelines of the hippie code:

Do your own thing, wherever you have to do it and whenever you want. Drop out. Leave society as you have known it. Leave it utterly. Blow the mind of every straight person you can reach. Turn them on, if not to drugs, then to beauty, love, honesty, fun.

“It is estimated that around 100,000 people traveled to San Francisco in the summer of 1967. The media was right behind them, casting a spotlight on the Haight-Ashbury district and popularizing the ‘hippie’ label. With this increased attention, hippies found support for their ideals of love and peace but were also criticized for their anti‑work, pro‑drug, and permissive ethos.

External images
- Death of Hippie sunrise, October 6, 1967
- Hippies parade, at Haight and Ashbury, carrying a symbolic casket. (North-east)
- Hippies parade, at Haight and Ashbury, carrying a symbolic casket. (East)
- George Harrison strums a borrowed guitar, followed by hippies. . Harrison spent an hour touring the Haight-Ashbury, before this stroll through Golden Gate Park.

At this point, the Beatles had released their groundbreaking album Sgt. Pepper's Lonely Hearts Club Band, which was quickly embraced by the hippie movement with its colorful psychedelic sonic imagery.

In 1967 Chet Helms brought the Haight Ashbury hippie and psychedelic scene to Denver, when he opened the Family Dog Denver, modeled on his Avalon Ballroom in San Francisco. The music venue created a nexus for the hippie movement in the western-minded Denver, which led to serious conflicts with city leaders, parents and the police, who saw the hippie movement as dangerous. The resulting legal actions and pressure caused Helms and Bob Cohen to close the venue at the end of that year.

By the end of the summer, the Haight-Ashbury scene had deteriorated. The incessant media coverage led the Diggers to declare the "death" of the hippie with a parade. According to poet Susan 'Stormi' Chambless, the hippies buried an effigy of a hippie in the Panhandle to demonstrate the end of his/her reign. Haight-Ashbury could not accommodate the influx of crowds (mostly naive youngsters) with no place to live. Many took to living on the street, panhandling and drug-dealing. There were problems with malnourishment, disease, and drug addiction. Crime and violence skyrocketed. None of these trends reflected what the hippies had envisioned. By the end of 1967, many of the hippies and musicians who initiated the Summer of Love had moved on. Beatle George Harrison had once visited Haight-Ashbury and found it to be just a haven for dropouts, inspiring him to give up LSD. Misgivings about the hippie culture, particularly with regard to substance use and lenient morality, fueled the moral panics of the late 1960s.

=== 1967–1970: Revolution and peak of influence ===
Anti-war protesters in Lincoln Park, Chicago, attending a Yippie organized event, approximately five miles north of the 1968 Democratic National Convention. The band MC5 can be seen playing.

By 1968, hippie-influenced fashions were beginning to take off in the mainstream, especially for youths and younger adults of the populous baby boomer generation, many of whom may have aspired to emulate the hardcore movements now living in tribalistic communes, but had no overt connections to them. This was noticed not only in terms of clothes and longer hair for men, but also in music, film, art and literature, not just in the United States, but around the world. Eugene McCarthy's brief presidential campaign successfully persuaded a significant minority of young adults to "get clean for Gene" by shaving their beards or wearing longer skirts; however the "Clean Genes" had little impact on the popular image in the media spotlight, of the hirsute hippy adorned in beads, feathers, flowers and bells.

A sign of this was the visibility that the hippie subculture gained in various mainstream and underground media. Hippie exploitation films are 1960s exploitation films about the hippie counterculture with stereotypical situations associated with the movement such as cannabis and LSD use, sex and wild psychedelic parties. Examples include The Love-ins, Psych-Out, The Trip, and Wild in the Streets. Other more serious and more critically acclaimed films about the hippie counterculture also appeared such as Easy Rider and Alice's Restaurant. (See also: List of films related to the hippie subculture.) Documentaries and television programs have also been produced until today as well as fiction and nonfiction books. The popular Broadway musical Hair was presented in 1967.

People commonly label other cultural movements of that period as hippie, but there are differences. For example, hippies were often not directly engaged in politics, as contrasted with "Yippies" (Youth International Party), an activist organization. The Yippies came to national attention during their celebration of the 1968 spring equinox, when some 3,000 of them took over Grand Central Terminal in New York—eventually resulting in 61 arrests. Especially their leaders Abbie Hoffman and Jerry Rubin, the Yippies became notorious for their theatrics, such as trying to levitate the Pentagon at the October 1967 war protest, and such slogans as "Rise up and abandon the creeping meatball!" Their stated intention to protest the 1968 Democratic National Convention in Chicago in August, including nominating their own candidate, "Lyndon Pigasus Pig" (an actual pig), was also widely publicized in the media at this time.

In Cambridge, Massachusetts hippies congregated each Sunday for a large "be-in" at Cambridge Common with swarms of drummers and those beginning the Women's Movement. In the United States, the Hippie movement started to be seen as part of the "New Left", which was associated with anti-war college-campus protest movements. The New Left was a term used mainly in the United Kingdom and United States in reference to activists, educators, agitators and others in the 1960s and 1970s who sought to implement a broad range of reforms on issues such as gay rights, abortion, gender roles and drugs in contrast to earlier leftist or Marxist movements that had taken a more vanguardist approach to social justice and focused mostly on labor unionization and questions of social class.

In April 1969, the building of People's Park in Berkeley, California received international attention. The University of California, Berkeley had demolished all the buildings on a 2.8-acre (11,000 m^{2}) parcel near campus, intending to use the land to build playing fields and a parking lot. After a long delay, during which the site became a dangerous eyesore, thousands of ordinary Berkeley citizens, merchants, students, and hippies took matters into their own hands, planting trees, shrubs, flowers and grass to convert the land into a park. A major confrontation ensued on May 15, 1969, when Governor Ronald Reagan ordered the park destroyed, which led to a two-week occupation of the city of Berkeley by the California National Guard. Flower power came into its own during this occupation as hippies engaged in acts of civil disobedience to plant flowers in empty lots all over Berkeley under the slogan "Let a Thousand Parks Bloom".

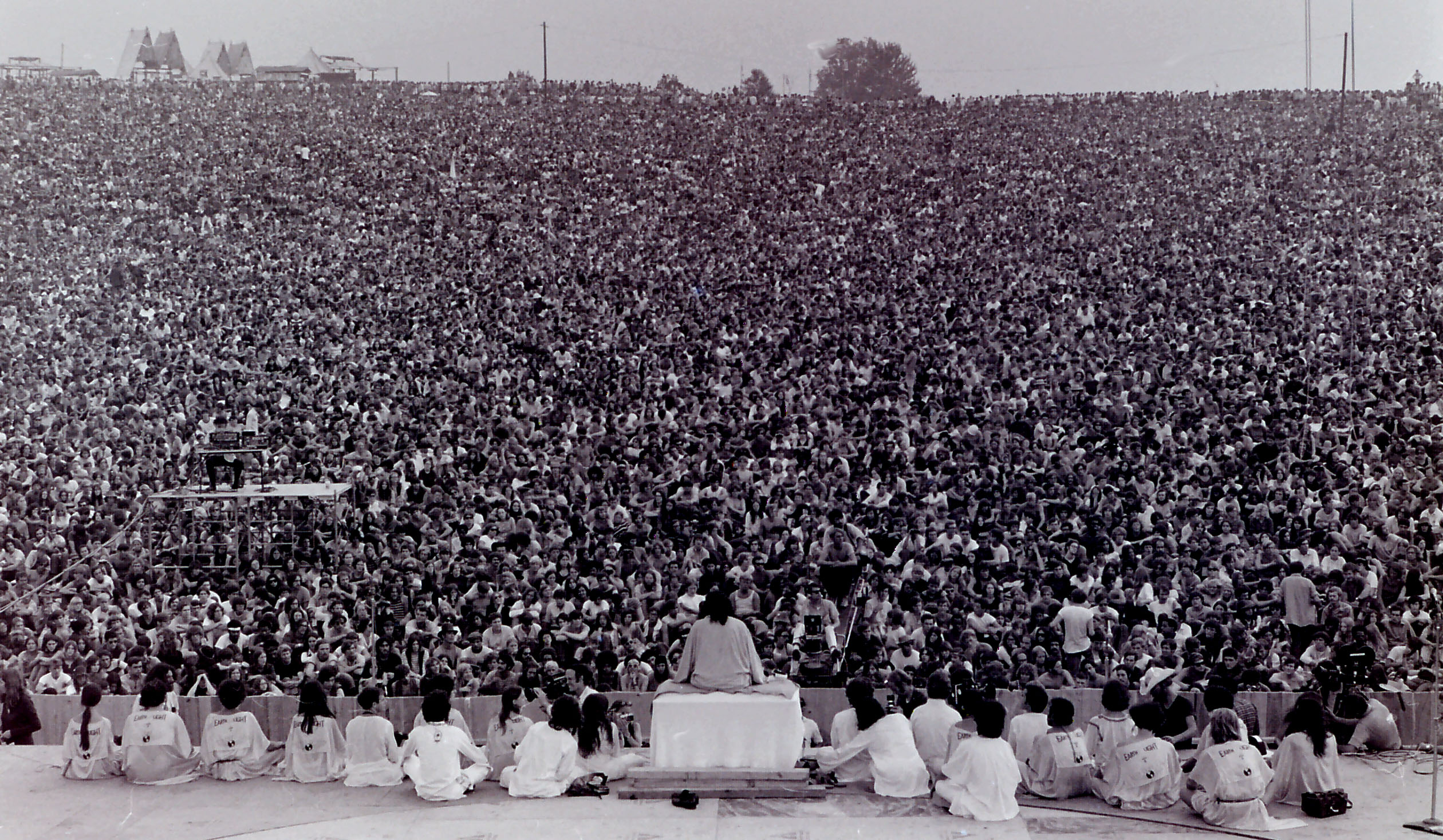
Swami Satchidananda giving the opening talk at the Woodstock Festival of 1969

In August 1969, the Woodstock Music and Art Fair took place in Bethel, New York, which for many, exemplified the best of hippie counterculture. Over 500,000 people arrived to hear some of the most notable musicians and bands of the era, among them Canned Heat, Richie Havens, Joan Baez, Janis Joplin, Grateful Dead, Creedence Clearwater Revival, Crosby, Stills, Nash & Young, Carlos Santana, Sly and the Family Stone, the Who, Jefferson Airplane and Jimi Hendrix. Wavy Gravy's Hog Farm provided security and attended to practical needs, and the hippie ideals of love and human fellowship seemed to have gained real-world expression. Similar rock festivals occurred in other parts of the country, which played a significant role in spreading hippie ideals throughout America.

In December 1969, a rock festival took place in Altamont, California, about 45 km (30 miles) east of San Francisco. Initially billed as "Woodstock West", its official name was the Altamont Free Concert. About 300,000 people gathered to hear the Rolling Stones; Crosby, Stills, Nash & Young; Jefferson Airplane and other bands. The Hells Angels provided security that proved far less benevolent than the security provided at the Woodstock event: 18-year-old Meredith Hunter was stabbed and killed by one of the Hells Angels during the Rolling Stones' performance after he brandished a gun and waved it toward the stage.

=== 1970–1973: Aftershocks and decline ===
By the 1970s, the 1960s zeitgeist that had spawned hippie culture seemed to be on the wane. The events at the Altamont Free Concert shocked many Americans, including those who had strongly identified with hippie culture. Another shock came in the form of the Sharon Tate and Leno and Rosemary LaBianca murders committed in August 1969 by Charles Manson and his "family" of followers.

Nevertheless, the turbulent political atmosphere that featured the bombing of Cambodia and shootings by National Guardsmen at Jackson State University and Kent State University still brought people together. These shootings inspired the May 1970 song by Quicksilver Messenger Service "What About Me?", where they sang, "You keep adding to my numbers as you shoot my people down", as well as Neil Young's "Ohio", a song that protested the Kent State massacre, recorded by Crosby, Stills, Nash and Young. The anti-war movement reached its peak at the 1971 May Day Protests as over 12,000 protesters were arrested in Washington, D.C.; President Nixon himself actually ventured out of the White House and chatted with a group of the hippie protesters. The draft was ended soon thereafter, in January 1973.

=== 1973–present: Absorption into the mainstream and new developments ===
Much of hippie style had been integrated into mainstream American society by the early 1970s. Large rock concerts that originated with the 1967 KFRC Fantasy Fair and Magic Mountain Music Festival and Monterey Pop Festival and the British Isle of Wight Festival in 1968 became the norm, evolving into stadium rock in the process. During the mid-late 1970s, with the end of the draft and the Vietnam War, a renewal of patriotic sentiment associated with the approach of the United States Bicentennial, the decline in popularity of psychedelic rock, and the emergence of new genres such as prog rock, heavy metal, disco, and punk rock, the mainstream media lost interest in the hippie counterculture. At the same time there was a revival of the Mod subculture, skinheads, teddy boys and the emergence of new youth cultures, like the punks, goths (an arty offshoot of punk), and football casuals; starting in the late 1960s and early 1970s in Britain, hippies had begun to come under attack by skinheads.

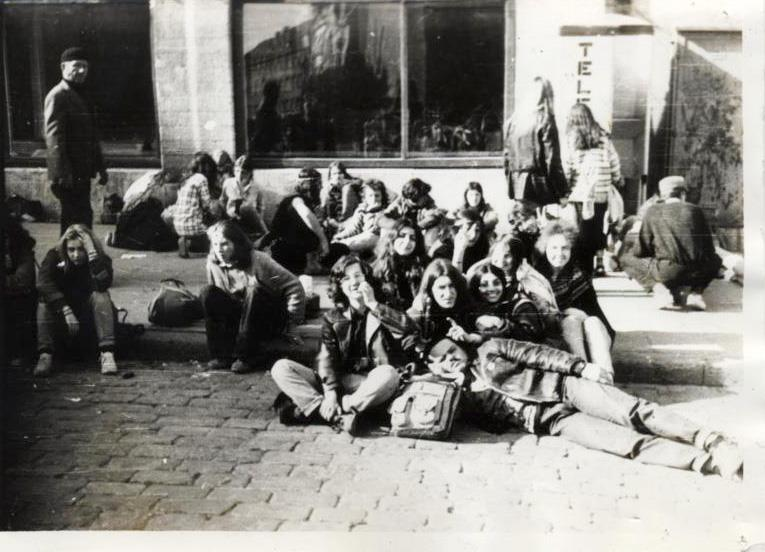
A group of hippies in Tallinn, 1989

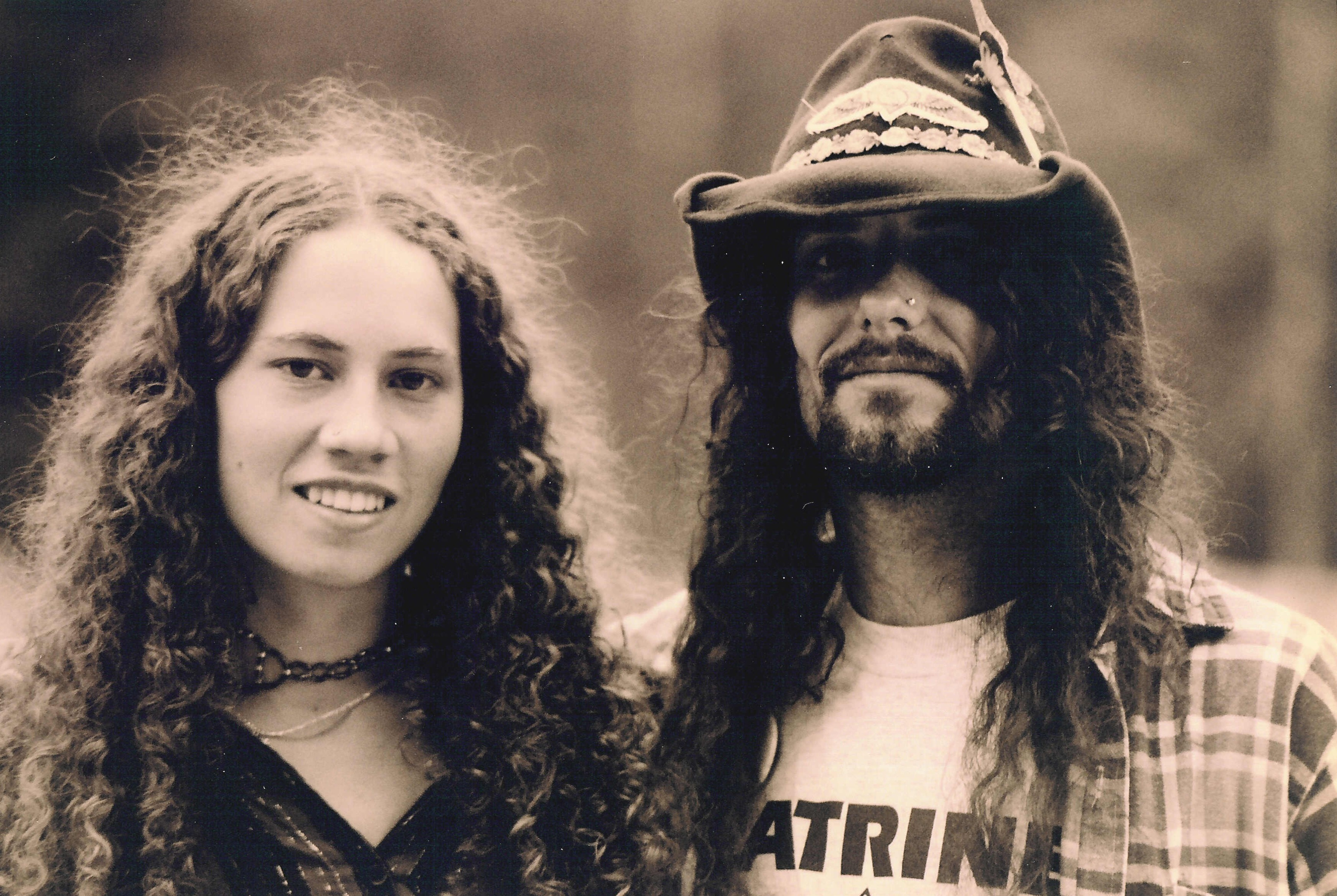
Couple attending Snoqualmie Moondance Festival, August 1993

Many hippies would adapt and become members of the growing countercultural New Age movement of the 1970s. While many hippies made a long-term commitment to the lifestyle, some people argue that hippies "sold out" during the 1980s and became part of the materialist, self-centered consumer yuppie culture. Although not as visible as it once was, hippie culture has never died out completely: hippies and neo-hippies can still be found on college campuses, on communes, and at gatherings and festivals. Many embrace the hippie values of peace, love, and community, and hippies may still be found in bohemian enclaves around the world. Hippie communes, where members tried to live the ideals of the hippie movement, continued to flourish. On the West Coast, Oregon had quite a few, while in 1970, the hippie community of Tawapa was founded in New Mexico. It lasted until the 1990s, when the people were pushed off the land due to housing developments. Around 1994, a new term, "Zippie", was being used to describe hippies that had embraced New Age beliefs, new technology, and a love for electronic music.

== Ethos and characteristics ==
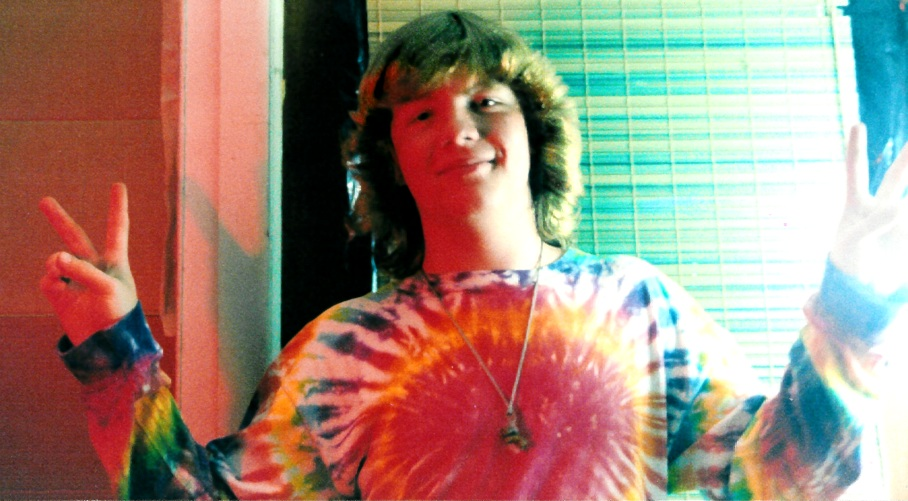
Tie-dyed clothes, associated with hippie culture

The bohemian predecessor of the hippie culture in San Francisco was the "Beat Generation" style of coffee houses and bars, whose clientele appreciated literature, a game of chess, music (in the forms of jazz and folk style), modern dance, and traditional crafts and arts like pottery and painting." The entire tone of the new subculture was different. Jon McIntire, manager of the Grateful Dead from the late 1960s to the mid-1980s, points out that the great contribution of the hippie culture was this projection of joy. "The beatnik thing was black, cynical, and cold." Hippies sought to free themselves from societal restrictions, choose their own way, and find new meaning in life. One expression of hippie independence from societal norms was found in their standard of dress and grooming, which made hippies instantly recognizable to one another, and served as a visual symbol of their respect for individual rights. Through their appearance, hippies declared their willingness to question authority, and distanced themselves from the "straight" and "square" (i.e., conformist) segments of society. Personality traits and values that hippies tend to be associated with are "altruism and mysticism, honesty, joy and nonviolence".

=== Art and fashion ===
Leading proponents of the 1960s Psychedelic Art movement were San Francisco poster artists such as Rick Griffin, Victor Moscoso, Bonnie MacLean, Stanley Mouse and Alton Kelley, and Wes Wilson. Their psychedelic-rock concert posters were inspired by Art Nouveau, Victoriana, Dada, and pop art. Posters for concerts in the Fillmore West, a concert auditorium in San Francisco, popular with hippie audiences, were among the most notable of the time. Richly saturated colors in glaring contrast, elaborately ornate lettering, strongly symmetrical composition, collage elements, rubber-like distortions, and bizarre iconography are all hallmarks of the San Francisco psychedelic poster art style. The style flourished from roughly the years 1966 until 1972. Their work was immediately influential to album cover art, and indeed all of the aforementioned artists also created album covers.

Psychedelic light shows were a new art form developed for rock concerts. Using oil and dye in an emulsion that was set between large convex lenses upon overhead projectors, the light-show artists created bubbling liquid visuals that pulsed in rhythm to the music. This was mixed with slide shows and film loops to create an improvisational motion picture art form, and to give visual representation to the improvisational jams of the rock bands and create a completely "trippy" atmosphere for the audience. The Brotherhood of Light, Glenn McKay’s Headlights and Bill Ham were responsible for many of the light shows in San Francisco psychedelic rock concerts.

Out of the psychedelic counterculture there also arose a new genre of comic books: underground comix. Zap Comix was among the original underground comics, and featured the work of Robert Crumb, S. Clay Wilson, Victor Moscoso, Rick Griffin, and Robert Williams among others. Underground comix were ribald and intensely satirical, and seemed to pursue weirdness for the sake of weirdness. Gilbert Shelton created perhaps the most enduring of underground cartoon characters, The Fabulous Furry Freak Brothers, whose drugged-out exploits held a mirror up to the hippie lifestyle of the 1960s.

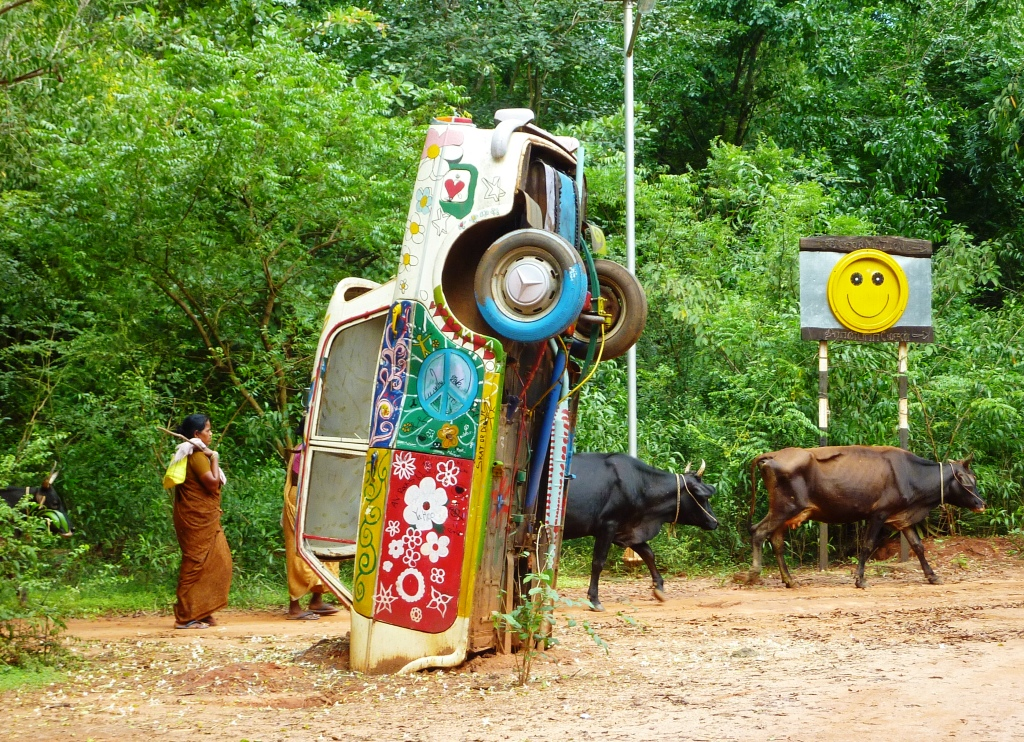
Monument to the hippie era in Tamil Nadu, India

As in other counterculture movements such as the beat movement and the later punk movement, hippie symbols and iconography were purposely borrowed from either "low" or "primitive" cultures, with hippie fashion reflecting a disorderly, often vagrant style. As with other adolescent, white middle-class movements, deviant behavior of the hippies involved challenging the prevailing gender differences of their time: both men and women in the hippie movement wore jeans and maintained long hair, and both genders wore sandals, moccasins or went barefoot. Men often wore beards, while women wore little or no makeup, with many going braless. Hippies often chose brightly colored clothing and wore unusual styles, such as bell-bottom pants, vests, tie-dyed garments, dashikis, peasant blouses, and long, full skirts; non-Western inspired clothing with Native American, Latin American, African and Asiatic motifs was also popular. Much hippie clothing was self-made in defiance of corporate culture, and hippies often purchased their clothes from flea markets and second-hand shops. Favored accessories for both men and women included Native American jewelry, head scarves, headbands, long beaded necklaces, and circular John Lennon style glasses. Hippie homes, vehicles and other possessions were often decorated with psychedelic art. The bold colors, hand-made clothing and loose fitting clothes opposed the tight and uniform clothing of the 1940s and 1950s. It also rejected consumerism in that the hand-production of clothing called for self-efficiency and individuality.

=== Love and sex ===
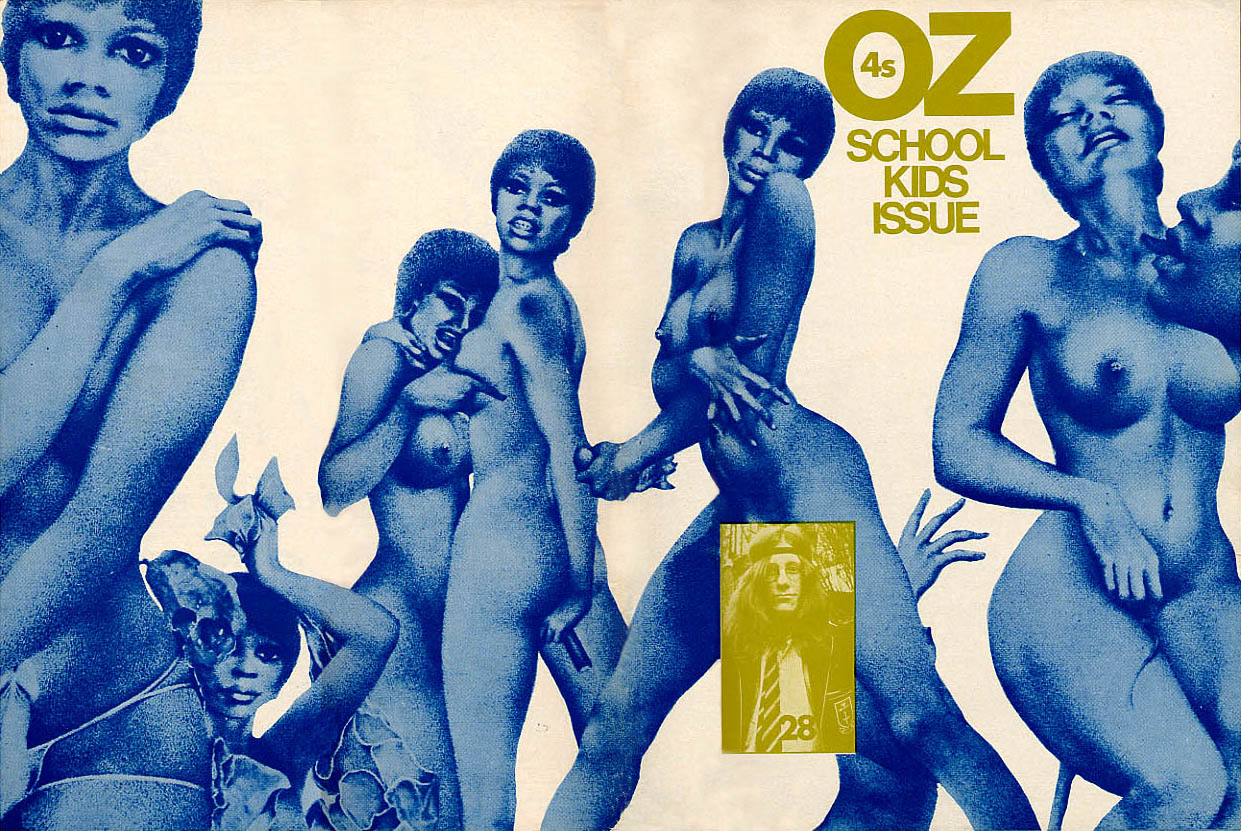
Oz number 28, also known as the "Schoolkids issue of Oz", which was the main cause of a 1971 high-profile obscenity case in the United Kingdom. Oz was a UK underground publication with a general hippie / counter-cultural point of view.

The common stereotype on the issues of love and sex had it that the hippies were "promiscuous, having wild sex orgies, seducing innocent teenagers and every manner of sexual perversion." The hippie movement appeared concurrently in the midst of a rising sexual revolution, in which many views of the status quo on this subject were being challenged.

The clinical study Human Sexual Response was published by Masters and Johnson in 1966, and the topic suddenly became more commonplace in America. The 1969 book Everything You Always Wanted to Know About Sex (But Were Afraid to Ask) by psychiatrist David Reuben was a more popular attempt at answering the public's curiosity regarding such matters. Then in 1972 appeared The Joy of Sex by Alex Comfort, reflecting an even more candid perception of lovemaking. By this time, the recreational or 'fun' aspects of sexual behavior were being discussed more openly than ever before, and this more 'enlightened' outlook resulted not just from the publication of such new books as these, but from a more pervasive sexual revolution that had already been well underway for some time.

The hippies inherited various countercultural views and practices regarding sex and love from the Beat Generation; "their writings influenced the hippies to open up when it came to sex, and to experiment without guilt or jealousy." One popular hippie slogan that appeared was "If it feels good, do it!" which for many meant "you are free to love whomever you please, whenever you please, however you please". This encouraged spontaneous sexual activity and experimentation, such as group sex, public sex, homosexuality, and open relationships.

Hippies embraced the old slogan of free love of the radical social reformers of other eras; it was accordingly observed that "Free love made the whole love, marriage, sex, baby package obsolete. Love was no longer limited to one person, you could love anyone you chose. In fact love was something you shared with everyone, not just your sex partners. Love exists to be shared freely. We also discovered the more you share, the more you get! So why reserve your love for a select few? This profound truth was one of the great hippie revelations." Sexual experimentation alongside psychedelics also occurred, due to the perception of their being uninhibitors. Others explored the spiritual aspects of sex.

=== Travel ===
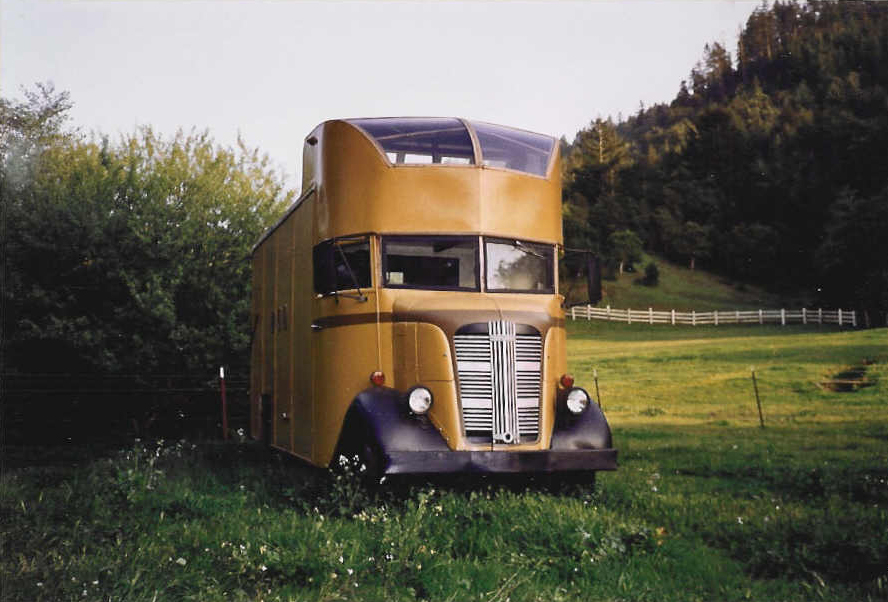
Hand-crafted Hippie Truck, 1968

Hippies tended to travel light, and could pick up and go wherever the action was at any time. Whether at a love-in on Mount Tamalpais near San Francisco, a demonstration against the Vietnam War in Berkeley, or one of Ken Kesey's "Acid Tests", if the "vibe" was not right and a change of scene was desired, hippies were mobile at a moment's notice. Planning was eschewed, as hippies were happy to put a few clothes in a backpack, stick out their thumbs and hitchhike anywhere. Hippies seldom worried whether they had money, hotel reservations or any of the other standard accoutrements of travel. Hippie households welcomed overnight guests on an impromptu basis, and the reciprocal nature of the lifestyle permitted greater freedom of movement. People generally cooperated to meet each other's needs in ways that became less common after the early 1970s. This way of life is still seen among Rainbow Family groups, new age travellers and New Zealand's housetruckers.

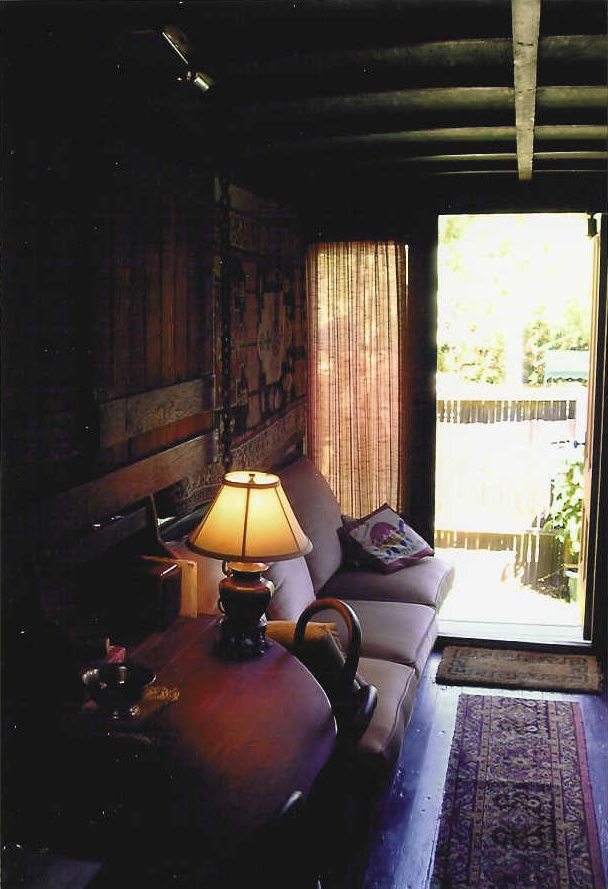
Hippie Truck interior

A derivative of this free-flow style of travel were the hippie trucks and buses, hand-crafted mobile houses built on a truck or bus chassis to facilitate a nomadic lifestyle, as documented in the 1974 book Roll Your Own. Some of these mobile houses were quite elaborate, with beds, toilets, showers and cooking facilities.

On the West Coast, a unique lifestyle developed around the Renaissance Faires that Phyllis and Ron Patterson first organized in 1963. During the summer and fall months, entire families traveled together in their trucks and buses, parked at Renaissance Pleasure Faire sites in Southern and Northern California, worked their crafts during the week, and donned Elizabethan costume for weekend performances, and attended booths where handmade goods were sold to the public. The sheer number of young people living at the time made for unprecedented travel opportunities to special happenings. The peak experience of this type was the Woodstock Festival near Bethel, New York, from August 15 to 18, 1969, which drew between 400,000 and 500,000 people.

==== Hippie trail ====
One travel experience, undertaken by hundreds of thousands of hippies between 1969 and 1971, was the Hippie trail overland route to India. Carrying little or no luggage, and with small amounts of cash, almost all followed the same route, hitch-hiking across Europe to Athens and on to Istanbul, then by train through central Turkey via Erzurum, continuing by bus into Iran, via Tabriz and Tehran to Mashhad, across the Afghan border into Herat, through southern Afghanistan via Kandahar to Kabul, over the Khyber Pass into Pakistan, via Rawalpindi and Lahore to the Indian frontier. Once in India, hippies went to many different destinations, but gathered in large numbers on the beaches of Goa and Kovalam in Trivandrum (Kerala), or crossed the border into Nepal to spend months in Kathmandu. In Kathmandu, most of the hippies hung out in the tranquil surroundings of a place called Freak Street (Nepal Bhasa: Jhoo Chhen), which still exists near Kathmandu Durbar Square.

=== Spirituality and religion ===
Many hippies rejected mainstream organized religion in favor of a more personal spiritual experience. Buddhism and Hinduism often resonated with hippies, as they were seen as less rule-bound, and less likely to be associated with existing baggage. Some hippies embraced neo-paganism, especially Wicca. Others were involved with the occult, with people like Timothy Leary citing Aleister Crowley as influences. By the 1960s, western interest in Hindu spirituality and yoga reached its peak, giving rise to a great number of Neo-Hindu schools specifically advocated to a western public.

In his 1991 book, "Hippies and American Values", Timothy Miller described the hippie ethos as essentially a "religious movement" whose goal was to transcend the limitations of mainstream religious institutions. "Like many dissenting religions, the hippies were enormously hostile to the religious institutions of the dominant culture, and they tried to find new and adequate ways to do the tasks the dominant religions failed to perform." In his seminal, contemporaneous work, "The Hippie Trip", author Lewis Yablonsky notes that those who were most respected in hippie settings were the spiritual leaders, the so-called "high priests" who emerged during that era.

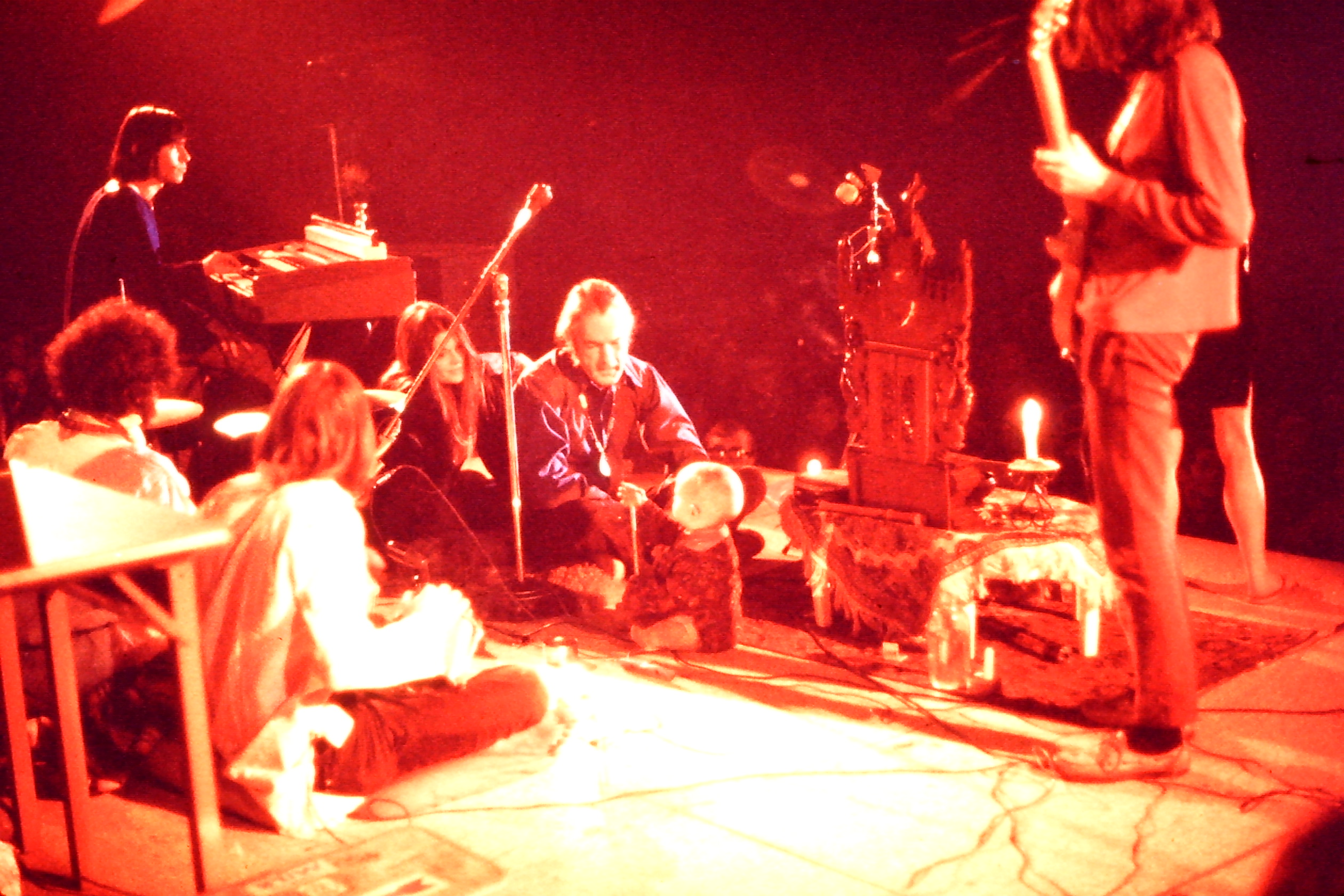
Timothy Leary, family and band on a lecture tour at State University of New York at Buffalo in 1969

One such hippie "high priest" was San Francisco State University Professor Stephen Gaskin. Beginning in 1966, Gaskin's "Monday Night Class" eventually outgrew the lecture hall, and attracted 1,500 hippie followers in an open discussion of spiritual values, drawing from Christian, Buddhist, and Hindu teachings. In 1970 Gaskin founded a Tennessee community called The Farm, and even late in life he still listed his religion as "Hippie."

Timothy Leary was an American psychologist and writer, known for his advocacy of psychedelic drugs. On September 19, 1966, Leary founded the League for Spiritual Discovery, a religion declaring LSD as its holy sacrament, in part as an unsuccessful attempt to maintain legal status for the use of LSD and other psychedelics for the religion's adherents based on a "freedom of religion" argument. The Psychedelic Experience was the inspiration for John Lennon's song "Tomorrow Never Knows" in the Beatles' album Revolver. Leary published a pamphlet in 1967 called Start Your Own Religion to encourage just that and was invited to attend the January 14, 1967 Human Be-In, a gathering of 20,000 to 30,000 hippies in San Francisco's Golden Gate Park. In speaking to the group, he coined the famous phrase "Turn on, tune in, drop out".

The English magician Aleister Crowley became an influential icon to the new alternative spiritual movements of the decade as well as for rock musicians. The Beatles included him as one of the many figures on the cover sleeve of their 1967 album Sgt. Pepper's Lonely Hearts Club Band, while Jimmy Page, the guitarist of the Yardbirds and co-founder of 1970s rock band Led Zeppelin, was fascinated by Crowley, and owned some of his clothing, manuscripts and ritual objects, and during the 1970s bought Boleskine House, which appears in the band's 1976 film The Song Remains the Same. On the back cover of the Doors 1970 compilation album 13, Jim Morrison and the other members of the Doors are shown posing with a bust of Aleister Crowley. Timothy Leary also openly acknowledged Crowley's inspiration.

After the hippie era, the Dudeist philosophy and lifestyle developed. Inspired by "the Dude", the neo-hippie protagonist of the Coen Brothers' 1998 film The Big Lebowski, Dudeism's stated primary objective is to promote a modern form of Chinese Taoism, outlined in Tao Te Ching by Laozi (6th century BC), blended with concepts by the Ancient Greek philosopher Epicurus (341–270 BC), and presented in a style as personified by the character of Jeffrey "the Dude" Lebowski, a fictional hippie character portrayed by Jeff Bridges in the film. Dudeism has sometimes been regarded as a mock religion, though its founder and many adherents regard it seriously.

Contrary to the hippies in the west, in the Soviet Union, there was a sizable amount of hippies that joined the Orthodox Church, which had largely been suppressed since the Bolshevik Revolution.

=== Politics ===
"The hippies were heirs to a long line of bohemians that includes William Blake, Walt Whitman, Ralph Waldo Emerson, Henry David Thoreau, Hermann Hesse, Arthur Rimbaud, Oscar Wilde, Aldous Huxley, utopian movements like the Rosicrucians and the Theosophists, and most directly the Beatniks. Hippies emerged from a society that had produced birth-control pills, a counterproductive war in Vietnam, the liberation and idealism of the civil rights movement, feminism, homosexual rights, FM radio, mass-produced LSD, a strong economy, and a huge number of baby-boom teenagers. These elements allowed the hippies to have a mainstream impact that dwarfed that of the Beats and earlier avant-garde cultures."

— "In Defense of Hippies" by Danny Goldberg

For the historian of the anarchist movement Ronald Creagh, the hippie movement could be considered as the last spectacular resurgence of utopian socialism. For Creagh, a characteristic of this is the desire for the transformation of society not through political revolution, or through reformist action pushed forward by the state, but through the creation of a counter-society of a socialist character in the midst of the current system, which will be made up of ideal communities of a more or less libertarian social form.

The peace symbol was developed in the UK as a logo for the Campaign for Nuclear Disarmament, and was embraced by U.S. anti-war protesters during the 1960s. Hippies were often pacifists, and participated in nonviolent political demonstrations, such as Civil Rights Movement, the marches on Washington, D.C., and anti–Vietnam War demonstrations, including draft-card burnings and the 1968 Democratic National Convention protests. The degree of political involvement varied widely among hippies, from those who were active in peace demonstrations, to the more anti-authority street theater and demonstrations of the Yippies, the most politically active hippie sub-group. Bobby Seale discussed the differences between Yippies and hippies with Jerry Rubin, who told him that Yippies were the political wing of the hippie movement, as hippies have not "necessarily become political yet". Regarding the political activity of hippies, Rubin said, "They mostly prefer to be stoned, but most of them want peace, and they want an end to this stuff."

In addition to nonviolent political demonstrations, hippie opposition to the Vietnam War included organizing political action groups to oppose the war, refusal to serve in the military and conducting "teach-ins" on college campuses that covered Vietnamese history and the larger political context of the war.

Scott McKenzie's 1967 rendition of John Phillips' song "San Francisco (Be Sure to Wear Flowers in Your Hair)", which helped to inspire the hippie Summer of Love, became a homecoming song for all Vietnam veterans arriving in San Francisco from 1967 onward. McKenzie has dedicated every American performance of "San Francisco" to Vietnam veterans, and he sang in 2002 at the 20th anniversary of the dedication of the Vietnam Veterans Memorial. Hippie political expression often took the form of "dropping out" of society to implement the changes they sought.

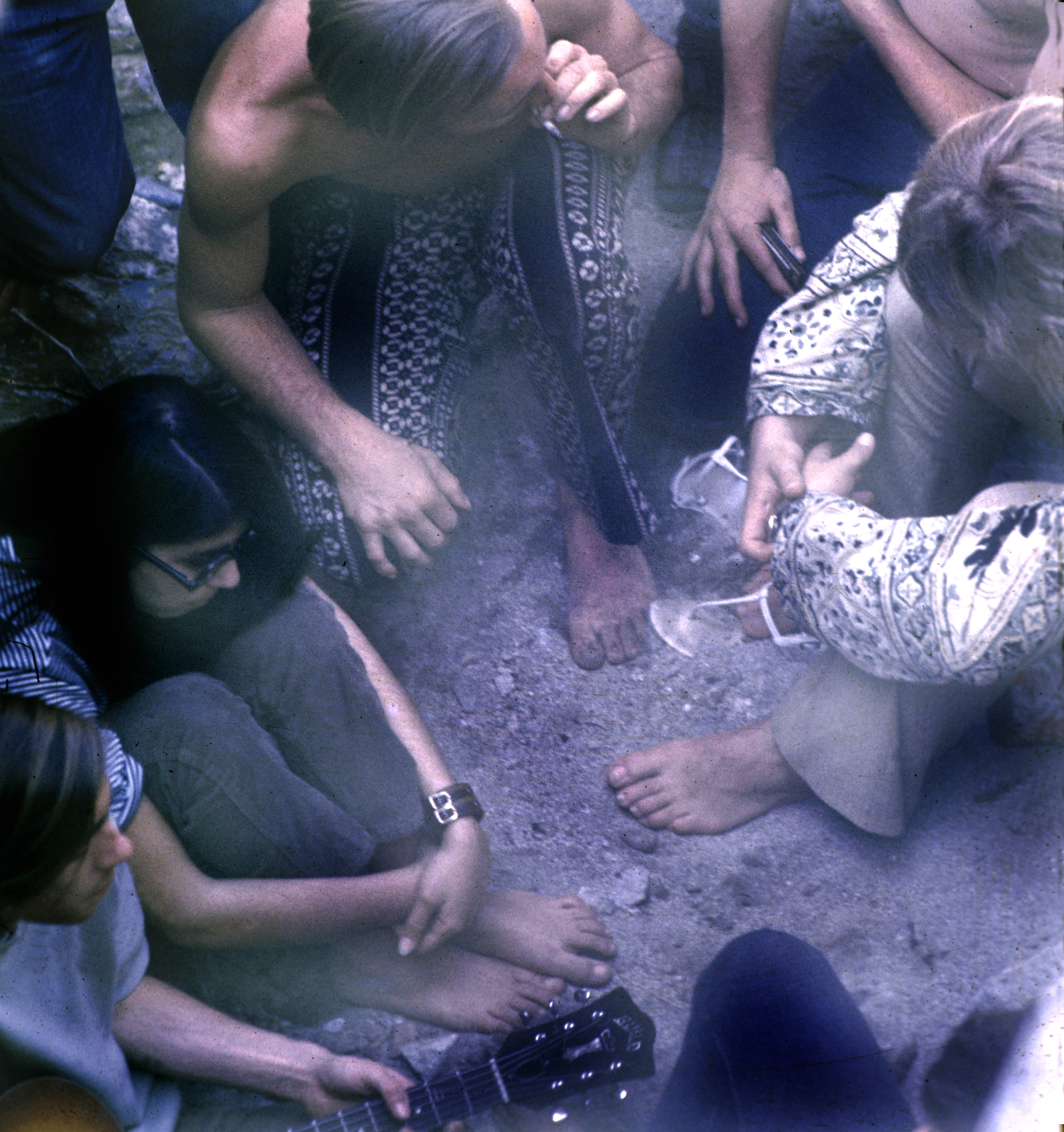
Tahquitz Canyon, Palm Springs, California, 1969, sharing a joint

Politically motivated movements aided by hippies include the back to the land movement of the 1960s, cooperative business enterprises, alternative energy, the free press movement, and organic farming.

The San Francisco group known as the Diggers articulated an influential radical criticism of contemporary mass consumer society, and so they opened free stores which simply gave away their stock, provided free food, distributed free drugs, gave away money, organized free music concerts, and performed works of political art. The Diggers took their name from the original English Diggers (1649–50) led by Gerrard Winstanley, and they sought to create a mini-society free of money and capitalism.

Such activism was ideally carried through anti-authoritarian and non-violent means; thus it was observed that "The way of the hippie is antithetical to all repressive hierarchical power structures since they are adverse to the hippie goals of peace, love and freedom... Hippies don't impose their beliefs on others. Instead, hippies seek to change the world through reason and by living what they believe."

The political ideals of hippies influenced other movements, such as anarcho-punk, rave culture, green politics, stoner culture and the New Age movement. Arguments can be made that being "woke" is only the latest natural offshoot of hipness, since both seek heightened "awareness" of one's surroundings (social, political, sexual etc.). For example, John Leland elaborates on the origins of coded language from African American slaves as a type of aware hipness and documents connections to downtrodden Jews and other minorities in American society in Hip: The History. Penny Rimbaud of the English anarcho-punk band Crass said in interviews, and in an essay called The Last of the Hippies, that Crass was formed in memory of his friend Wally Hope. Crass had its roots in Dial House, which was established in 1967 as a commune. Some punks were often critical of Crass for their involvement in the hippie movement. Like Crass, Jello Biafra was influenced by the hippie movement, and cited the yippies as a key influence on his political activism and thinking, though he also wrote songs critical of hippies.

=== Drugs ===
Following in the footsteps of the Beats, many hippies used cannabis (marijuana), considering it pleasurable and benign. They used drugs such as marijuana, LSD, psilocybin mushrooms, or magic mushrooms, and mescaline (peyote) to gain spiritual awakening.

On the East Coast of the United States, Harvard University professors Timothy Leary, Ralph Metzner and Richard Alpert (Ram Dass) advocated psychotropic drugs for psychotherapy, self-exploration, religious and spiritual use. Regarding LSD, Leary said, "Expand your consciousness and find ecstasy and revelation within."

On the West Coast of the United States, Ken Kesey was an important figure in promoting the recreational use of psychotropic drugs, especially LSD, also known as "acid." By holding what he called "Acid Tests", and touring the country with his band of Merry Pranksters, Kesey became a magnet for media attention that drew many young people to the fledgling movement. The Grateful Dead (originally billed as the Warlocks) played some of their first shows at the Acid Tests, often as high on LSD as their audiences. Kesey and the Pranksters had a "vision of turning on the world." Harder drugs, such as cocaine, amphetamines and heroin, were also sometimes used in hippie settings; however, these drugs were often disdained, even among those who used them, because they were recognized as harmful and addictive.

== Legacy ==
=== Culture ===
Newcomers to the Internet are often startled to discover themselves not so much in some soulless colony of technocrats as in a kind of cultural Brigadoon - a flowering remnant of the '60s, when hippie communalism and libertarian politics formed the roots of the modern cyberrevolution...

— Stewart Brand, "We Owe It All To The Hippies" (1995).

"The '60s were a leap in human consciousness. Mahatma Gandhi, Malcolm X, Martin Luther King, Che Guevara, they led a revolution of conscience. The Beatles, the Doors, Jimi Hendrix created revolution and evolution themes. The music was like Dalí, with many colors and revolutionary ways. The youth of today must go there to find themselves."

— Carlos Santana

The legacy of the hippie movement continues to permeate Western society. In general, unmarried couples of all ages feel free to travel and live together without societal disapproval. Frankness regarding sexual matters has become more common, and the rights of homosexual, bisexual and transgender people, as well as people who choose not to categorize themselves at all, have expanded. Religious and cultural diversity has gained greater acceptance.

Co-operative business enterprises and creative community living arrangements are more accepted than before. Some of the little hippie health food stores of the 1960s and 1970s are now large-scale, profitable businesses, due to greater interest in natural foods, herbal remedies, vitamins and other nutritional supplements. It has been suggested that 1960s and 1970s counterculture embraced certain types of "groovy" science and technology. Examples include surfboard design, renewable energy, aquaculture and client-centered approaches to midwifery, childbirth, and women's health. Authors Stewart Brand and John Markoff argue that the development and popularization of personal computers and the Internet find one of their primary roots in the anti-authoritarian ethos promoted by hippie culture.

Distinct appearance and clothing was one of the immediate legacies of hippies worldwide. During the 1960s and 1970s, mustaches, beards and long hair became more commonplace and colorful, while multi-ethnic clothing dominated the fashion world. Since that time, a wide range of personal appearance options and clothing styles, including nudity, have become more widely acceptable, all of which was uncommon before the hippie era. Hippies also inspired the decline in popularity of the necktie and other business clothing, which had been unavoidable for men during the 1950s and early 1960s. Additionally, hippie fashion itself has been commonplace in the years since the 1960s in clothing and accessories, particularly the peace symbol. Astrology, including everything from serious study to whimsical amusement regarding personal traits, was integral to hippie culture. The generation of the 1970s became influenced by the hippie and the 1960s countercultural legacy. As such in New York City musicians and audiences from the female, homosexual, Black, and Latino communities adopted several traits from the hippies and psychedelia. They included overpowering sound, free-form dancing, multi-colored, pulsating lighting, colorful costumes, and hallucinogens. 1960s Psychedelic soul groups like the Chambers Brothers and especially Sly and the Family Stone influenced George Clinton, P-funk and the Temptations. In addition, the perceived positivity, lack of irony, and earnestness of the hippies informed proto-disco music like M.F.S.B.'s album Love Is the Message. Disco music supported the '70s LGBT movement.

The hippie legacy in literature includes the lasting popularity of books reflecting the hippie experience, such as The Electric Kool-Aid Acid Test. In 1995, The Sekhmet Hypothesis attempted to link both hippie and rave culture together in relation to transactional analysis, suggesting that rave culture was a social archetype based on the mood of friendly strength, compared to the gentle hippie archetype, based on friendly weakness. The later electronic dance genres known as goa trance and psychedelic trance and its related events and culture have important hippie legacies and neo hippie elements. The popular DJ of the genre Goa Gil, like other hippies from the 1960s, left the US and Western Europe to travel on the hippie trail and later developed psychedelic parties and music in the Indian state of Goa, in which the goa and psytrance genres were born and exported around the world in the 1990s and 2000s.

=== Music ===
In music, the folk rock and psychedelic rock popular among hippies evolved into genres such as acid rock, world beat and heavy metal music. Psychedelic trance (also known as psytrance) is a type of electronic music influenced by 1960s psychedelic rock. The tradition of hippie music festivals began in the United States in 1965 with Ken Kesey's Acid Tests, where the Grateful Dead played tripping on LSD and initiated psychedelic jamming. For the next several decades, many hippies and neo-hippies became part of the Deadhead community, attending music and art festivals held around the country. The Grateful Dead toured continuously, with few interruptions between 1965 and 1995. Phish and their fans (called Phish Heads) operated in the same manner, with the band touring continuously between 1983 and 2004. Many contemporary bands performing at hippie festivals and their derivatives are called jam bands, since they play songs that contain long instrumentals similar to the original hippie bands of the 1960s.

With the demise of Grateful Dead and Phish, nomadic touring hippies attend a growing series of summer festivals, the largest of which is called the Bonnaroo Music & Arts Festival, which premiered in 2002. The Oregon Country Fair is a three-day festival featuring handmade crafts, educational displays and costumed entertainment. The annual Starwood Festival, founded in 1981, is a seven-day event indicative of the spiritual quest of hippies through an exploration of non-mainstream religions and world-views, and has offered performances and classes by a variety of hippie and counter-culture icons.

The Burning Man festival began in 1986 at a San Francisco beach party and is now held in the Black Rock Desert northeast of Reno, Nevada. Although few participants would accept the hippie label, Burning Man is a contemporary expression of alternative community in the same spirit as early hippie events. The gathering becomes a temporary city (36,500 occupants in 2005, 50,000+ in 2011), with elaborate encampments, displays, and many art cars. Other events that enjoy a large attendance include the Rainbow Family Gatherings, the Gathering of the Vibes, Community Peace Festivals, and the Woodstock Festivals.

=== United Kingdom ===
In the UK, there are many new age travellers who are known as hippies to outsiders, but prefer to call themselves the Peace Convoy. They started the Stonehenge Free Festival in 1974, but English Heritage later banned the festival in 1985, resulting in the Battle of the Beanfield. With Stonehenge banned as a festival site, new age travellers gather at the annual Glastonbury Festival. Today, hippies in the UK can be found in parts of South West England, such as Bristol (particularly the neighborhoods of Montpelier, Stokes Croft, St Werburghs, Bishopston, Easton and Totterdown), Glastonbury in Somerset, Totnes in Devon, and Stroud in Gloucestershire, as well as in Hebden Bridge in West Yorkshire, and in areas of London and Cornwall. In the summer, many hippies and those of similar subcultures gather at numerous outdoor festivals in the countryside.

In New Zealand, between 1976 and 1981, tens of thousands of hippies gathered from around the world on large farms around Waihi and Waikino for music and alternatives festivals. Named Nambassa, the festivals focused on peace, love, and a balanced lifestyle. The events featured practical workshops and displays advocating alternative lifestyles, self sufficiency, clean and sustainable energy and sustainable living.

In the UK and Europe, the years 1987 until 1989 were marked by a large-scale revival of many characteristics of the hippie movement. This later movement, composed mostly of people aged 18 to 25, adopted much of the original hippie philosophy of love, peace and freedom. The summer of 1988 became known as the Second Summer of Love. Although the music favored by this movement was modern electronic music, especially house music and acid house, one could often hear songs from the original hippie era in the chill out rooms at raves. Also, there was a trend towards psychedelic indie rock in the form of shoegaze, dream pop, Madchester and neo-psychedelic bands like Jesus And Mary Chain, the Sundays, Spacemen 3, Loop, Stone Roses, Happy Mondays, Inspiral Carpets and Ride. This was effectively a parallel soundtrack to the rave scene that was rooted as much in 1960s psychedelic rock as it was in post-punk, though Madchester was more directly influenced by acid house, funk and northern soul. Many ravers were originally soul boys and football casuals, and football hooliganism declined after the Second Summer of Love. In the UK, many of the well-known figures of this movement first lived communally in Stroud Green, an area of north London located in Finsbury Park.

=== Media ===
Popular films depicting the hippie ethos and lifestyle include Woodstock, Easy Rider, Hair, The Doors, Across the Universe, Taking Woodstock, and Crumb.

In 2002, photojournalist John Bassett McCleary published a 650-page, 6,000-entry unabridged slang dictionary devoted to the language of the hippies titled The Hippie Dictionary: A Cultural Encyclopedia of the 1960s and 1970s. The book was revised and expanded to 700 pages in 2004. McCleary believes that the hippie counterculture added a significant number of words to the English language by borrowing from the lexicon of the Beat Generation, through the hippies' shortening of beatnik words and then popularizing their usage.

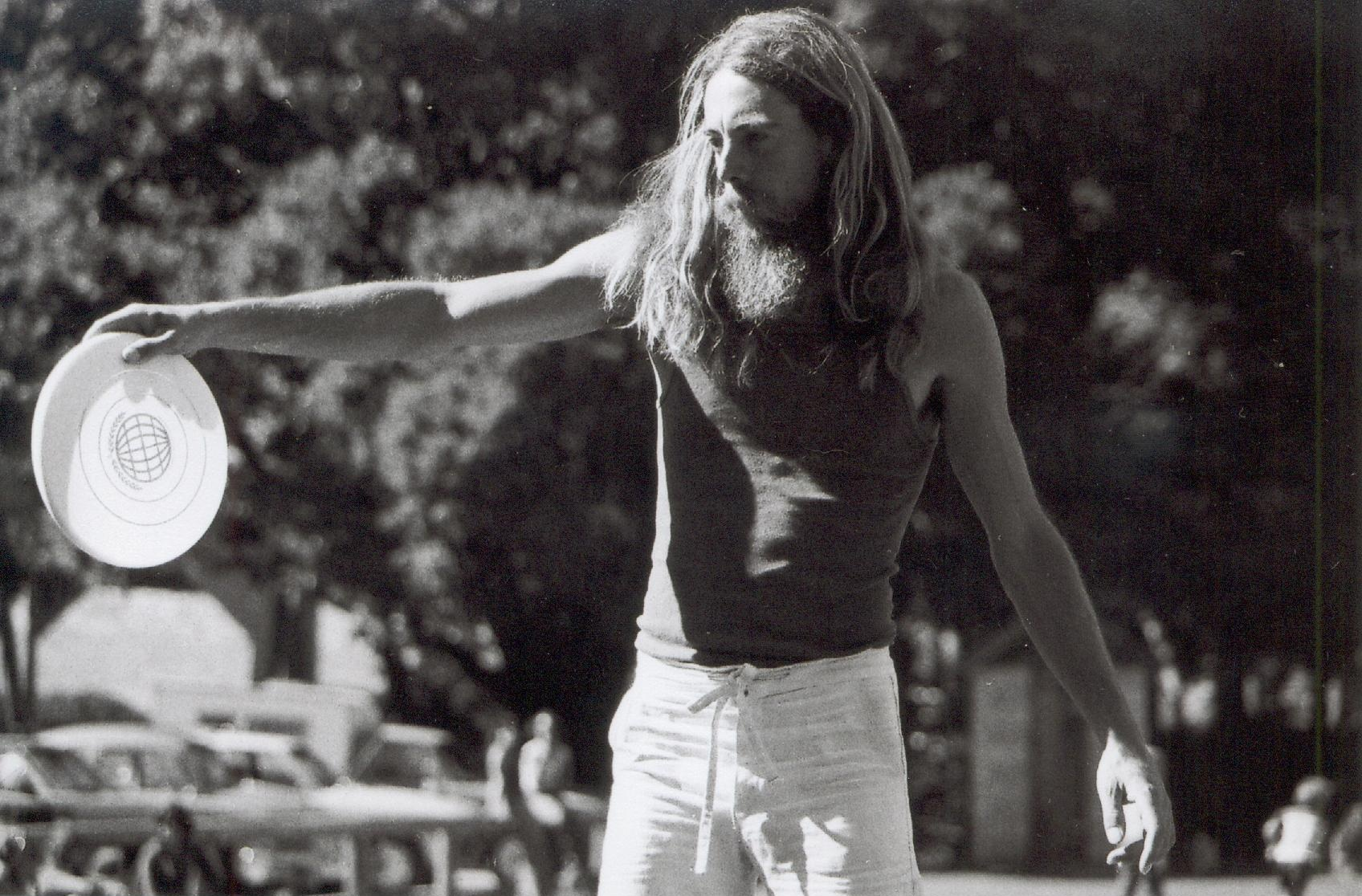
As a hippie, Ken Westerfield helped to popularize the alternative sport of Frisbee in the 1960s–1970s, that has become today's disc sports

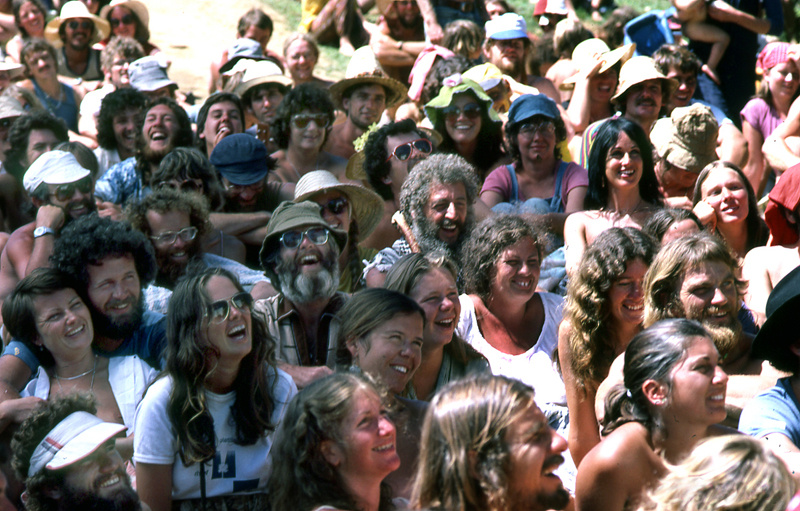
Hippies at the Nambassa 1981 Festival in New Zealand

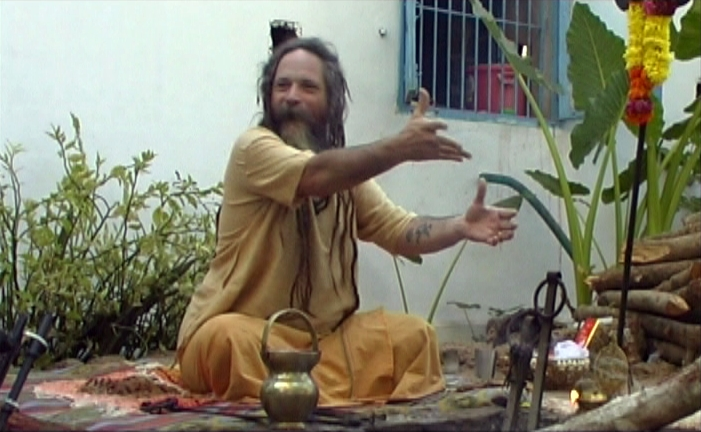
Goa Gil, original 1960s hippie who later became a pioneering electronic dance music DJ and party organizer, here appearing in the 2001 film Last Hippie Standing

== See also ==
- Afghan coat
- Anti-globalization movement
- Baby boomers
- Black Bear Ranch
- Blue Movie
- Cannabis culture
- Food Not Bombs
- Peacock revolution
- Generation gap
- Indomania
- Jesus freak
- List of alternative lifestyle communities
- List of historic rock festivals
- List of New Age topics
- Psychedelic syndrome
- Psychedelicism
- Rastafari
- Simple living
