= Kode IV =

American techno-industrial band

- Kode IV's original lineup with Hans Schiller and Peter Ziegelmeier

Background information
- Origin: San Francisco, California, United States
- Genre: Techno-industrial
- Years active: 1989–present
- Labels: KK Records; Ceiba Records
- Members: Peter Ziegelmeier
- Past members: Michael Gutierrez (a.k.a. Hans Schiller); Gilbert Levey (a.k.a. Goa Gil); Ariane MacAvoy

Kode IV is an American electronic music group based in San Francisco. They are notable for their significant use of sampling in styles that ranged from techno-industrial in their early releases to a more trance-based sound later on.

== History ==
Kode IV was formed by Austrian Peter Ziegelmeier (formerly of The Real Camouflage) and Michael Gutierrez (a.k.a. Hans Schiller, formerly recording under the name Kozmonaut).

Their first release was a self-titled cassette in 1989. This cassette has since been remastered and released on the band's Bandcamp page.

Their full-length album Possessed was released on the Belgian label KK Records in 1990. Their follow-up album Insane was released on KK Records in 1992.

The magazine Wired gave the album Insane a positive review in their April 1993 issue, writing,

"They've had several respectable hits on Euro dance charts, but these San Fran ravers are one of the city's best-kept secrets. Hans Schiller and Peter Ziegelmeier don't build their tunes on sampling, but once they've come up with a killer rhythm track, they play a sinister game of cut and paste, borrowing from C&W records, obscure B-movies, and altered musical quotes from anything you may have heard in the past 30 years. The voices of Patsy Cline, David Bowie, and Joan Crawford swim through a rich soup of hard-core electronic noise that'll stimulate your engrams as well as your feets."

The website idieyoudie.com gave the remaster of the 1992 album Insane a positive review on June 28, 2022, writing, "Tracks like 'Accelerate' and 'Disobey' still go hard, the former with its sampling of the THX intro sound and chopped up metal riffs, the latter with its horror movie sound track organ and choirs, all backed by robust bass synths and drum-machine programming that recalls new beat's darker, speedier moments." The review also notes that "the programming on 'Fight' has plenty in common with the emerging electro-industrial sound of the time, and could be spun in a set of comparably styled music today without raising an eyebrow."

Michael Gutierrez (a.k.a. Hans Schiller) died of AIDS on May 27, 1994. Hans Schiller's final work with Kode IV was on the song "The Ultimate Goal", which was released on the 1995 album Silicon Civilisation.

Artists Gilbert Levey (a.k.a. Goa Gil) and Ariane MacAvoy contributed to Kode IV after the death of Hans Schiller as the band took on a more trance sound. Kode IV's album Silicon Civilisation, featuring this more trance-based sound and the involvement of Goa Gil and Ariane MacAvoy on the songs "Dissolve II", "Change", and "The Ultimate Goal" as well as Goa Gil's involvement without Ariane MacAvoy on the song "Near to the Divine", was released on KK Records in 1995.

In 1996, Peter Ziegelmeier founded the influential trance label Ceiba Records.

Peter Ziegelmeier was later briefly involved in the band The Nommos with Goa Gil and Ariane MacAvoy.

== Discography ==
Kode IV's second lineup with Goa Gil, Ariane MacAvoy, and Peter Ziegelmeier

Studio albums

- Possessed (August 15, 1990, KK Records, KK 042)
- Insane (March 1, 1992, KK Records, KK 078)
- Silicon Civilisation (January 23, 1995, KK Records, KK 109)
- Goa Gil • Ceiba • Kode IV @ Burning Man (1998, Ceiba Records, CR004)

Singles and EPs

- Kode IV (1989, self-released cassette)
- Scratch Attack (June 3, 1991, KK Records, KK 058) (12" vinyl)
- Final Demonic Madness Cut (June 3, 1991, KK Records, KK 058) (CD maxi-single)
- Insane (April 10, 1992, KK Records, KK 075)
- Dissolve (1994, KK Records, KK 089)
- Faust (October 4, 1994, KK Records, KK 120)
- Near to the Divine / Fearless (October 4, 1995, KK Records, KK 145)

Compilations

- Best Of... Compilation (December 8, 1996, KK Records, KK 146)
- Epilepsy and Kode IV – Baphomet II (The Unanswered Questions : The Seven Seals of Baphomet) (1997, Alpharec 666)

== Touring and live performances ==
Kode IV tends to remain in or close to San Francisco for its live shows. Over the years, Kode IV has performed shows together with many notable artists such as Shpongle, Prometheus, Younger Brother, Infected Mushroom, Juno Reactor, Astrix, Goa Gil, and more.

== Influence ==
The website idieyoudie.com has repeatedly written that the band's work predated other more well-known artists who had later gained recognition for doing similar things. An article from 2011 stated that "Kode IV were doing the techno-industrial thing way back in like 1990, decades before the current crop of bands like Noisuf-X and [X]-RX who are messing with those same ideas came along." A later article from 2022 stated that "Decades before the Berlin school of techno-body music materialized, there was Kode IV. The San Francisco based project founded by Peter Ziegelmeier and Hans Schiller in 1989 put out three albums that bridged the sample-heavy sounds of nascent trance music (Ziegelmeier would go on to co-found the influential trance label Ceiba Records after Schiller's untimely passing in 1994) and the mid-eighties EBM sound. The project's extensive use of horror movie and guitar samples and gritty synths held a lot of appeal for industrial clubs and DJs of the era". That article continued, "Later in the decade Richie Hawtin would make techno's debt to electronic body music with the inclusion of Nitzer Ebb on his iconic Decks EFX and 909 mix, but Kode IV was already mining that connection with 'Fear into Power''s gang-chant vocals and 'Success''s interpolation of the bassline from 'Let Your Body Learn'."

In a review of the industrial dance music compilation Control I'm Here – Adventures on the Industrial Dancefloor 1983 – 1990, reviewer Phil Newall noted the lack of songs by Kode IV on the release.

Kode IV has been listed as an influence on artists such as Laura Palmer.
