= Cleo Odzer =

American author (1950–2001)

- Odzer in 1969
- Born: Sheila Lynne Odzer; 16 April 1950; New York City, US
- Died: 26 March 2001 (aged 50); Goa, India
- Education: Stanford University (BA); New School for Social Research (PhD)
- Occupations: Author; anthropologist
- Partner: Keith Emerson (1960s)
- Writing career
- Language: English
- Website: www.echonyc.com/~cleo/index.html

Cleo Odzer (born Sheila Lynne Odzer; April 6, 1950 – March 26, 2001) was an American author and anthropologist known for her works exploring subcultures, including prostitution in Thailand, the hippie culture of Goa, and the emerging phenomenon of cybersex.

== Early life ==
Cleo Odzer grew up in Manhattan, New York City. She was the daughter of Rena Abelson Odzer and Harry Odzer. Her father, president of a textile company, died when she was 16 years old. She attended Franklin School in Manhattan (now Dwight School) and Quintano's School for Young Professionals, graduating from the latter in 1968.

== Time as a groupie ==
In 1968, Odzer began writing about the music scene for a small Greenwich Village newspaper. During this time, she met English keyboardist Keith Emerson, then member of the rock band the Nice and later of Emerson, Lake & Palmer, at The Scene nightclub. Later that year she publicly announced their engagement. However, in his 2003 autobiography, Pictures of an Exhibitionist, Emerson stated that there was no actual engagement. He only learned about the alleged "engagement" from a February 1969 Time magazine, which included her photo and described her as a "Super Groupie". Odzer later claimed that the article led to the breakup of the 'engagement'.

Shortly thereafter in 1969, Odzer recorded an album called The Groupies, produced by Alan Lorber, which essentially consisted of interviews with Odzer and some friends describing their adventures meeting (and sleeping with) rock musicians.

== Hippie years in Goa ==
In the early 1970s, Odzer traveled in Europe and the Middle East and worked as a model. She spent the late 1970s in the hippie culture of Anjuna, Goa in India. Her experiences there, including heavy use of cocaine and heroin, the international drug smuggling used to finance the stay, and her subsequent two-week incarceration, would later form the basis of her second book, Goa Freaks: My Hippie Years in India (1995, ISBN 1-56201-059-X). For a time she followed the teachings of Bhagwan Shree Rajneesh in India.

== Return to U.S.; academic pursuits and research in Thailand ==
After returning to the United States in the late 1970s, Odzer underwent drug treatment at Daytop in New York. She attended college and then graduate school, obtaining a Ph.D. in anthropology from the New School for Social Research in New York City in 1990, with a thesis on prostitution in Thailand. Starting in 1987, she spent three years in Thailand researching this topic. In her dissertation, she presented case studies of 17 individuals connected to the sex industry in Patpong. She concludes that the economic opportunities provided by sex work do not translate into a higher status of women, because of persistent stigma and ideas about gender inequality in Thai society. She wrote about her experiences in Thailand in her first book, Patpong Sisters: An American Woman's View of the Bangkok Sex World (1994, ISBN 1-55970-281-8). In this work she describes the Thai prostitutes she got to know as quick-witted entrepreneurs rather than exploited victims, sometimes revered in their poor home villages. She also relates her own problematic affair with a Thai pimp boyfriend.

Following publication of the book, Odzer worked at Daytop in New York, the drug rehabilitation organization she herself had attended earlier.

== Cybersex research and media ventures ==
From 1995 to 1998, she produced several dozen episodes of her public-access television series, Cleo's Adventures for Manhattan Neighborhood Network public-access television. Her third book, Virtual Spaces: Sex and the Cyber Citizen (1997, ISBN 0-425-15986-8), deals with the then-new phenomenon of cybersex. She appeared in episode 1.21 of SexTV in 1999, with a segment on cybersex.

== Return to Goa, and death ==
In 1999, disillusioned with life in New York, Odzer returned to Goa. Some of the remaining old-time hippies reportedly resented her for the attention her book had brought to their scene. She died in Goa on March 26, 2001, at the age of 50. According to her close friend "Cookie," with whom she had recorded "The Groupies" much earlier and who had been corresponding with Odzer during her final stay in India, Odzer's doctor suggested that her death was likely caused by a stroke related to very high cholesterol and severe circulatory issues for which she had been receiving treatment during her final year. Following her death, her body was cremated after a small service.

Arun Saldanha, a researcher who interviewed members of the Goa community about Odzer, recounts a different account. He was informed by a psychiatrist at the Goa Medical College that her body had remained unclaimed in a morgue in Mapusa for over a month before being buried without a funeral. The psychiatrist also claimed that Odzer had HIV/AIDS. Saldanha reported witnessing Odzer use cocaine during an interview sometime prior to her death.

== Legacy ==
The 2002 documentary Last Hippie Standing, directed by Marcus Robbin, explored the Goa scene and included some of Odzer's Super 8 footage from the 1970s. Shortly before her death, Odzer was interviewed by Robbin for the film and said:

I don't know what the future brings, but I know what I don't want: New York is what I don't want, that culture is what I don't want; it's not right. I don't know what is right. I don't think our old life was right. I don't see a new culture that is right, but we have to continue trying, that's the best we can do, that's the best any of us can do, to keep trying. To make something that is peaceful for everybody, that makes people happy, that is fair to everybody. And that's all I want.

The film was dedicated to her memory.
