= Last Hippie Standing =

2001 film by Marcus Robbin

- Directed by: Marcus Robbin
- Written by: Marcus Robbin
- Produced by: Tangiji Film
- Music by: Arnd Mechsner; Peter Aumeier
- Release date: 2001
- Running time: 45 minutes
- Country: Germany
- Language: English

Last Hippie Standing (2001) is a 45-minute German documentary about the party scene in Goa, India. Directed by filmmaker Marcus Robbin, the film compares the 1960s and 1970s hippie era with the situation in 2000.

The film has no commentary and consists of documentation of the ongoing party culture in Goa, as well as private and previously unreleased Super 8 footage from the 1960s and 1970s in Goa, filmed by American author Cleo Odzer. This material is the only existing contemporary film document of the hippie era in Goa. Furthermore, interviews with hippie veterans like Goa Gil, locals, and the former chief minister of Goa, Francisco Sardinha, describe the clashes that occur between the party culture and Indian conservatism. The last part of the documentary is shot at the Berlin Love Parade, where the protagonists reflect on their own spiritual development and the changes that have occurred since the hippie movement's advent.

Since 2004, it has been distributed by Nowonmedia (Japan).

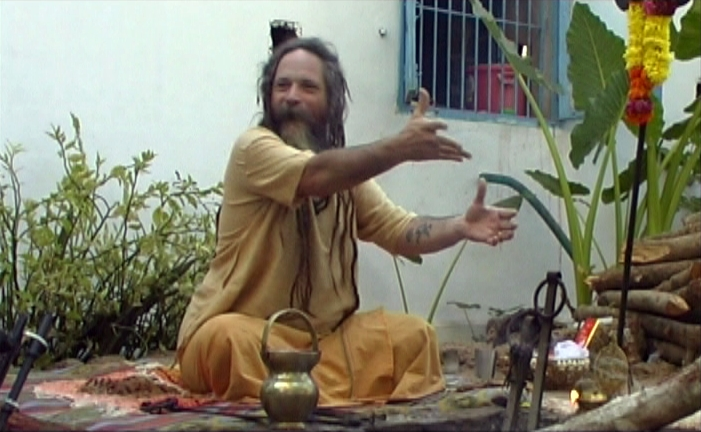
DJ Goa Gil in Last Hippie Standing

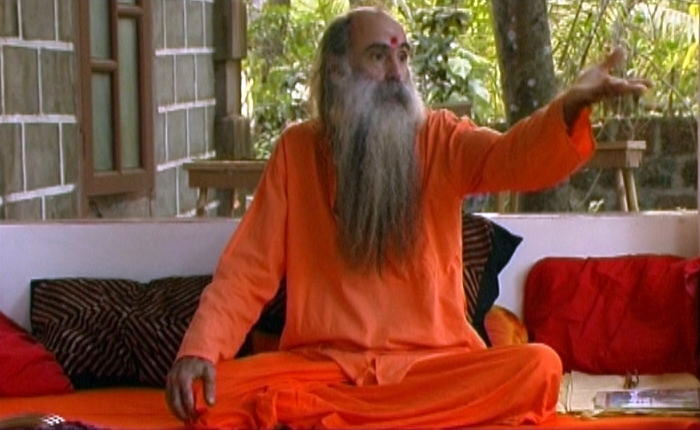
Swami William in Last Hippie Standing
