= List of alternative lifestyle communities =

This is a list of communities known for having a major hippie subculture and/or other forms of alternative lifestyle subcultures.

== Asia ==
=== Israel ===
Settlement	Region	Reference(s)
Pardes Hanna-Karkur	Haifa District	

== Europe ==
=== Germany ===
Settlement	Region	State	Reference(s)
Vauban, Freiburg im Breisgau	Freiburg	Baden-Württemberg	

=== Spain ===
Settlement	Province	Region	Reference(s)
Tarifa	Cádiz	Andalusia	

=== United Kingdom ===
Settlement	County	Country	Reference(s)
Findhorn	—N/a	Scotland	
Glastonbury	Somerset	England	
Grassington	North Yorkshire	England	
Hebden Bridge	West Yorkshire	England	
Totnes	Devon	England	

== Oceania ==
=== Australia ===
Settlement	State/territory	Reference(s)
Ballina	New South Wales	
Bangalow	New South Wales	
Bellingen	New South Wales	
Bermagui	New South Wales	
Bogangar	New South Wales	
Brunswick Heads	New South Wales	
Byron Bay	New South Wales	
Cabarita Beach	New South Wales	
Conondale, Sunshine Coast	Queensland	
Daylesford	Victoria	
Elands	New South Wales	
Eumundi, Sunshine Coast	Queensland	
Kuranda	Queensland	
Lennox Head	New South Wales	
Margaret River	Western Australia	
Mullumbimby	New South Wales	
Nimbin	New South Wales	
Sheffield	Tasmania	
Upwey, Melbourne	Victoria	
Yackandandah	Victoria	
Yamba	New South Wales	

=== New Zealand ===
Settlement	Region	Reference(s)
Coromandel	Waikato	
Raglan	Waikato	
