= Timothy Miller =

American academic

- Born: Timothy A. Miller; 1944 (age 81–82)
- Occupation: Professor

Timothy A. Miller (born 1944) is a professor of Religious Studies at the University of Kansas at Lawrence. He has been involved in the Communal Studies Association (US) and Utopian Studies Society (Europe), and is past president of the International Communal Studies Association (Israel). He has a particular interest in intentional communities and new religious movements.

== Personal life ==
His son is Aber Miller, 'sweetheart jazz man' of Humboldt County.

== Bibliography ==
- —— (1973). Ethics and the counter culture. University of Kansas.
- —— (1987). Following in his steps: a biography of Charles M. Sheldon. University of Tennessee Press. ISBN 978-0-87049-537-3.
- —— (1990). American communes, 1860-1960: a bibliography. Garland Publications. ISBN 0-8240-8470-5.
- —— (1991). The hippies and American values. Univ. of Tennessee Press. ISBN 978-0-87049-694-3.
- —— (1995). America's alternative religions. SUNY Press. ISBN 978-0-7914-2397-4.
- —— (1998). The Quest for Utopia in Twentieth-century America: 1900-1960. Syracuse University Press. ISBN 0-8156-2775-0.
- —— (1999). The 60s communes: hippies and beyond. Syracuse University Press. ISBN 978-0-8156-0601-7.
- —— (1999). When prophets die: the postcharismatic fate of new religious movements. SUNY Press. ISBN 0-7914-0717-9.
- Miller, Timothy; Fairfield, Richard; Watts, Alan (2010). The Modern Utopian: Alternative Communities Then and Now. Process. ISBN 978-1-934170-15-1.
