= Goa Gil =

American musician (1951–2023)

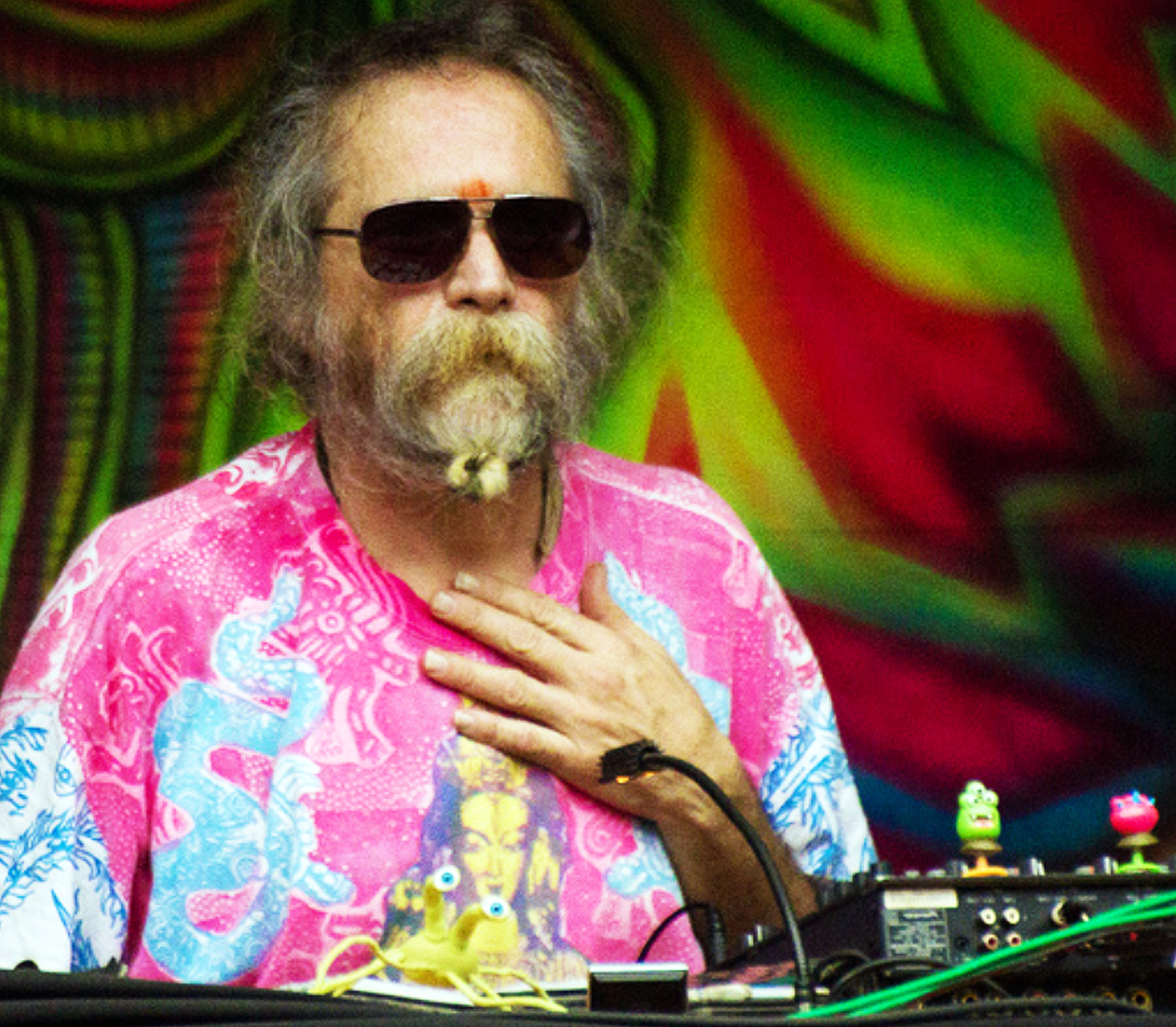
- Born: Gilbert Levey; October 6, 1951; San Rafael, California, U.S.
- Died: October 26, 2023 (aged 72); California, U.S
- Website: Www.GoaGil.com

Goa Gil (born Gilbert Levey, October 11, 1951 – October 26, 2023) was an American musician, DJ, remixer, and party organizer. He was one of the founders of the Goa trance and psytrance movement in electronic music.

== Biography ==
Gilbert Levey was born on October 11, 1951, and grew up in San Rafael, California. He witnessed the birth of the hippie movement and acid rock, and was involved with the freak collectives The Family Dog and Sons of Champlin. Feeling that the San Francisco musical scene was falling apart, he took off in 1969, going first to Amsterdam and then to India, settling in Goa. Here he discovered the sadhus, wandering holy men living off the forest, covering themselves with ash. Soon, Gil himself became a Sadhu, Baba Mangalanand, in the order of the Juna Akhara, under the Guru, Mahant Nirmalanand Saraswati.

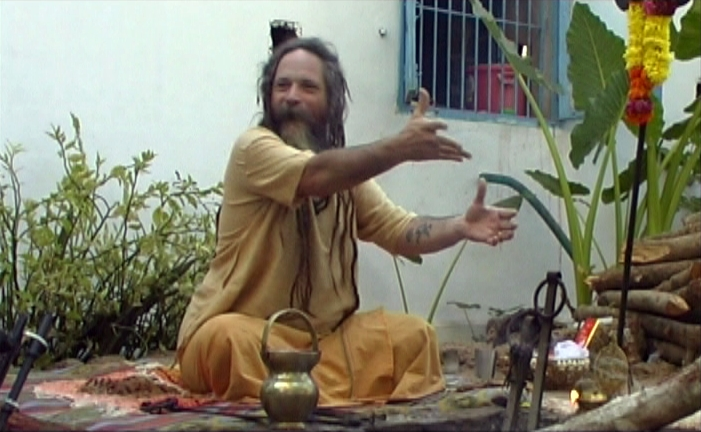
Goa Gil in the 2001 film Last Hippie Standing

During the early 1980s, many Goa hippies were becoming increasingly fascinated with early electronic music such as Kraftwerk. Gil and his friends soon gathered some equipment and started DJing and playing live music all night long on the Goa beaches. The mix of outdoor electronic dance parties with Eastern mystical and spiritual overtones came to define the aesthetic of the psytrance movement. For Gil, dance is an active form of meditation and the use of trance music is a way to "redefine the ancient tribal ritual for the 21st century". During the 1990s, the aesthetic of the Goa trance movement spread by way of European and Israeli backpackers who attended parties in India.

Gil was interviewed for the 2001 documentary Last Hippie Standing which explored the scene in Goa.

In January 2006, Gil DJ'ed the all-night closing party of the three-day LSD-symposium at Basel, Switzerland, in honor of LSD-inventor Albert Hofmann's 100th birthday January 11, 2006, after Hofmann himself had delivered the closing speech of the symposium.

Goa Gil was married to Ariane. Together they formed the band the Nommos. Gil died of cancer on October 26, 2023, at the age of 72.
