= Jack Foster =

Jack Foster may refer to:

- Jack Foster (athlete) (1932–2004), England-born New Zealand long-distance runner
- Jack Foster (Australian footballer) (1912–1995), Australian footballer for Melbourne
- Jack Foster (footballer, born 1877) (1877–1946), English footballer
- Jack Foster (cricketer) (1905–1976), English cricketer
- Jack Foster (journalist) (1906–1978), American journalist
- Jack Foster (Neighbours), fictional character on the Australian soap opera Neighbours
- Jack Foster hoax, fictitious Australian footballer
- Jack Foster III from Trent Gardner

== See also ==
- John Foster (disambiguation)
- Jack Forster (born 1987), rugby player
