= John Foster =

John Foster may refer to:

== 15th/16th/17th-century politicians ==
- John Foster (MP for Bristol), 15th-century MP for Bristol
- John Foster (died 1576), Member of Parliament for Winchester, Plympton Erle and Hindon
- John Foster (by 1508-47/51), MP for Much Wenlock
- John Foster (died 1558), MP for Shaftesbury and Hertfordshire
- John Foster (printer) (1648–1681) was the earliest American engraver and the first Boston printer.

== 18th-century politicians ==
- John Foster of Dunleer (died 1747), MP for Dunleer, grandfather of 1st Baron Oriel
- John William Foster (1745–1809), MP for Dunleer
- John Thomas Foster (1747–1796), MP
- John Foster, 1st Baron Oriel (1740–1828), speaker of the Irish House of Commons
- John Foster (Dunleer MP) (1770–1792), MP for Dunleer 1790–1792, son of 1st Baron Oriel

== 19th/20th-century politicians ==
- John Foster (Lord Mayor of York) on List of Lord Mayors of York
- John Foster (Virginia politician) on List of mayors of Richmond, Virginia
- John Foster (Tasmanian politician) (1792–1875), member of the Tasmanian Legislative Council
- John Leslie Foster (1781–1842), Irish barrister, judge and member of parliament
- John Foster (Australian politician) (1818–1900), politician in colonial New South Wales and Victoria
- John W. Foster (1836–1917), American diplomat
- John H. Foster (politician) (1862–1917), U.S. Representative from Indiana
- Kenneth Foster (politician) (John Kenneth Foster, 1866–1930), British Conservative Party politician
- John Foster, candidate in the 1927 Manitoba general election
- John Foster (MP for Northwich) (1904–1982), British Conservative Party politician

== Academics ==
- John Foster (canon) (died 1773), headmaster of Eton College
- John Foster (essayist) (1770–1843), English Baptist minister and essayist
- John Wells Foster (1815–1873), American geologist
- John Stuart Foster (1890–1944), Canadian physicist
- John S. Foster Jr. (John Stuart Foster Jr., 1922–2025), American physicist and government official
- John Foster (philosopher) (1941–2009), British philosopher
- John Wilson Foster (born 1942), Irish literary critic and cultural historian
- John Bellamy Foster (born 1953), American Marxist scholar
- John Foster (paleontologist) (born 1966), American paleontologist

== Art and entertainment ==
- John Foster (printer) (1648–1681), American printer and engraver
- John Foster (composer) (1752–1822), English composer
- John B. Foster (artist) (1865–1930), New England watercolorist
- John Foster (cartoonist) (1886–1959), also director
- John Foster (Italian singer) (born 1939), Italian singer
- John Foster (British singer) (born 1960), British singer
- John Foster (cinematographer), see Independent Spirit Award for Best Cinematography
- John Foster (singer) (born 2006), runner-up on American Idol season 23

== Sports ==
- John B. Foster (baseball) (1863–1941), New York City baseball writer, sports editor, and ballclub officer
- John Foster (water polo) (1931–2013), Australian water polo player
- John Foster (sport shooter) (born 1936), American sports shooter
- John Foster Sr. (sailor) (born 1938), American sport-sailor & sled racer
- John Foster (cricketer) (born 1955), former English cricketer
- John Foster Jr. (sailor) (born 1963), American sport-sailor
- John Foster (footballer) (born 1973), English footballer
- John Foster (baseball) (born 1978), American baseball player
- John Foster (hurdler) (born 1954), American hurdler, 1976 All-American for the Stanford Cardinal track and field team

== Journalists ==
- John Foster (Canadian journalist), see This Land
- John Foster (BBC journalist) on Scottish Lobby

== Religious figures ==
- John Foster, 18th century American clergyman, husband of Hannah Webster Foster
- John Onesimus Foster (1833–1920), American Methodist minister
- John Foster (priest) (1921–2000), Anglican dean of Guernsey
- John Foster (Archdeacon of Huntingdon), Archdeacon of Huntingdon and Wisbech

== Others ==
- John Foster (died 1829), plantation owner, owned the slave Abdul Rahman Ibrahima Sori
- John Foster Sr. (engineer) (1758–1827), Liverpool based British engineer
- John Foster (architect, born 1786) (1786–1846), Liverpool based British architect, son of John Foster Sr.
- John H. Foster (physician) (1796–1874), American physician and member of boards of education
- John Foster (textile manufacturer) (1798–1879), British worsted cloth manufacturer
- John G. Foster (1823–1874), United States Army officer and Union general during the American Civil War
- John Foster (architect, born 1830) (1830–1880), Bristol based British architect
- John Foster (environmentalist) (1920–2020), British environmentalist
- John Foster, sound editor, see BAFTA Award for Best Sound
- John Foster (trade unionist), see Jeremy Dear
- John Foster (fireboat), see MetalCraft Marine

== Fiction ==
- John Foster, a character in the television series Skins

== See also ==
- Jon Foster (disambiguation)
- Jack Foster (disambiguation)
- John Forster (disambiguation)
- Jonathan Foster (disambiguation)
