= George Foster Herben =

American physician (1893–1966)

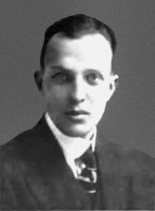
- Foster Herben aged around 23
- Born: George Foster Herben; 17 March 1893
- Died: 17 March 1966 (aged 73)
- Occupation: Physician
- Known for: Work on treatments for tuberculosis
- Relatives: John Onesimus Foster, Stephen J. Herben, Grace Foster Herben, Stephen J. Herben Jr.

George Foster Herben (17 March 1893 – 17 March 1966) was an American physician. He spent his career in New York, predominantly treating tuberculosis. After interning at Brooklyn Hospital, Herben worked at the Loomis Sanitarium by Liberty, and then at the House of Rest at Sprain Ridge, a tuberculosis hospital and preventorium in Yonkers. At the House of Rest he variously served as physician in chief and as medical director. Herben developed and published several new treatments during this time, including a replacement for conventional iron lungs.

Herben was the son of Stephen J. Herben and Grace Foster Herben, a Methodist minister and missionary, respectively. His father's influence occasioned a number of high-profile acquaintances, from meeting President Theodore Roosevelt as a boy to knowing his father's friend Thomas Edison. He was the older brother of Stephen J. Herben Jr., a professor of philology at Bryn Mawr College.

== Early life and education ==
Sheet music for a 1911 Evanston Academy fight song, for which Herben wrote the lyrics (click on image to see other pages)

George Foster Herben, who went by Foster, was born on March 17, 1893. His father was Stephen J. Herben, a minister and editor, and a close friend of Thomas Edison who conducted the service at his burial in 1931. George Herben's mother was Grace Foster Herben, an educator and missionary. He was the older of two children; Stephen J. Herben Jr., who became a philologist at Bryn Mawr College, was born four years later. They were the great-great-great-grandsons of Henry Batton, a sergeant in the American Revolutionary War, a fact that occasioned George Herben's later membership in the Sons of the American Revolution.

In 1902, on a visit to Washington, D.C., with his father, Herben met President Theodore Roosevelt and assorted politicians; he published an account of the trip, titled "How I Saw the President", in The Epworth Herald. Four years later, when Herben was thirteen, his mother was accidentally shot—by Herben according to some reports—in circumstances that newspapers initially termed mysterious, and police suspicious. The two had left to go target shooting along with Stephen J. Herben Jr. on the lake shore just north of Evanston, Illinois, when George, whose rifle had become jammed, handed it to his mother for inspection; in the process the gun fired, lodging a bullet about Grace Herben's left knee. Front-page headlines initially suggested that at the hospital the staff refused to admit the police for several hours until threatened with arrest, that Herben herself refused to discuss the shooting with them, and that her husband had "assumed a hostile attitude" with the chief. "I don't intend to make any of the facts known", Herben Sr. said. A day after slamming his front door in the faces of reporters, he explained the affair to the Chicago newspapers, and stated that his wife was "getting along nicely, and will be out [of the hospital] in a few days, I hope."

Like both his father and brother, George Herben attended Evanston Academy in Illinois, graduating in 1911; while there he penned the words for a school fight song, with an extra chorus aimed specifically at their "'honorable opponents'", Evanston Township High School. After some three years at Wesleyan University, Herben, like his brother, matriculated at Rutgers University. There he was on the swim team, and an associate editor of The Targum. He graduated in June 1916 with a Bachelor of Science; in the yearbook's so-called "Roll of Honor", he was teased as "The ones with distinguished friends—Foster Herben, 'Me and Edison.'" During World War I, Herben enlisted in the United States Army Medical Corps, and was part of the Cornell University Medical School Unit of the Student Army Training Corps. He served in the states, enlisting on 8 January 1918, and receiving an honorable discharge on 7 December of the same year. On 9 June 1921, he graduated from the Cornell University Medical College in New York City with a Doctor of Medicine.

== Career ==
Following a short vacation in the Adirondacks, where his family had a cottage at Twitchell Lake, Herben began his career in 1921 as an intern at the Brooklyn Hospital. In June 1927 Herben began work at the Loomis Sanitorium, by Liberty, New York. He worked there until at least 1934, during which time he served as the president of the Medical Society of the County of Sullivan. Herben later worked for many years at the House of Rest at Sprain Ridge, a church-affiliated tuberculosis hospital and preventorium in Yonkers, New York. At various times he worked there as the physician in chief, and as the medical director. In 1947, he was nominated to the Board of Managers of the Yonkers Bureau of Laboratories.

Herben spoke at conferences, including the Tuberculosis Sanatorium Conference of Metropolitan New York, and helped develop several new treatments for tuberculosis. One such treatment, displayed at the annual meeting of the National Tuberculosis Association in 1948, and published in the Journal of the American Medical Association in 1949, was designed to replace conventional iron lungs by placing patients in a pressurized chamber which forced air into, and out of, a patient, without the use of their lungs.

George Herben was a member of the American Medical Association, American College of Physicians, and the American College of Chest Physicians. He was reappointed a vice president of the latter—then known as the Federation of American Sanatoria—in 1936. Herben served as the Governor for the organization's New York chapter as of 1945, when he presented it with a plan for postgraduate medical education for physicians leaving the armed services after World War II. In 1946, he was made a Life Member of the American College of Physicians, having previously been a Fellow.

== Personal life ==
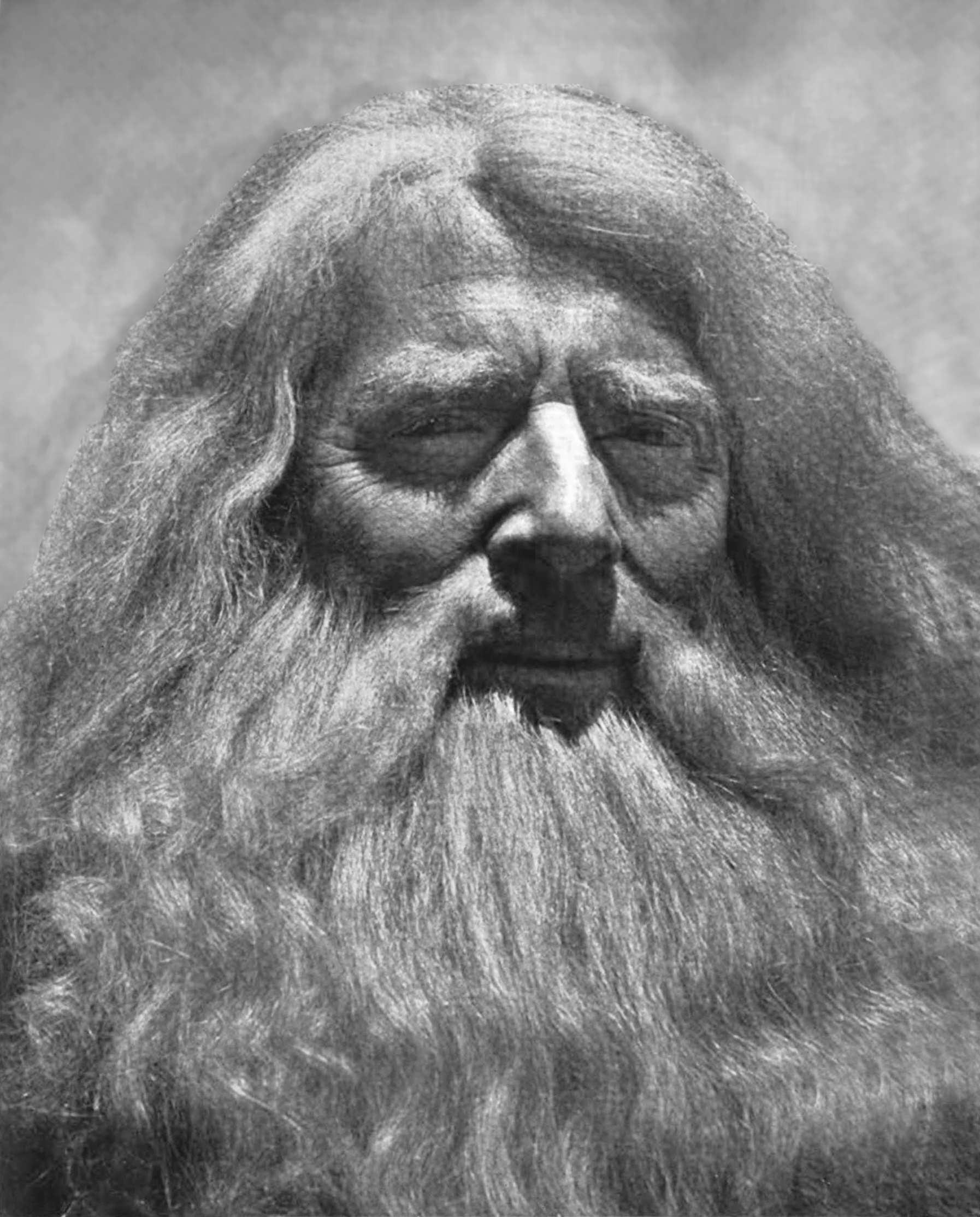
Herben's 1943 photograph Silver Patriarch

Herben married Beatrice Slayton, also a doctor who worked at a sanitarium, on 20 June 1918. The ceremony was at her family's Twitchell Lake summer house, with his father officiating. They had two children, Muriel Lewis and Foster Herben. George Herben had a long-time interest in radio, and studied photography at one point; in 1943 The American Annual of Photography published his photograph Silver Patriach. He died of a heart attack on 17 March 1966, his 73rd birthday.

== Publications ==
- Herben, George Foster (4 March 1905). "How I Saw the President". The Epworth Herald. Vol. XV, no. 40. Chicago, Illinois. pp. 1018–1019.
- Herben, George Foster (1 July 1922). "Digalen". Journal of the American Medical Association. 79 (1). American Medical Association: 61. doi:10.1001/jama.1922.02640010065036.
- Cullen, James H.; Barach, Alvan L. & Herben, George Foster (May–June 1948). "Closure of Cavities in Pulmonary Tuberculosis Produced by Immobilization of Both Lungs". Diseases of the Chest. XIV (3): 345–359. doi:10.1378/chest.14.3.345. PMID 18858036.
- Barach, Alvan L.; Eastlake, Chesmore Jr.; Cullen, James H. & Herben, George Foster (26 March 1949). "Closure of Tuberculous Pulmonary Cavities: As Accomplished by Residence in the Immobilizing Lung Chamber". Journal of the American Medical Association. 139 (13). American Medical Association: 833–836. doi:10.1001/jama.1949.02900300019006. PMID 18112560.
- Sarot, Irving Arthur; Herben, George Foster & Cullen, James H. (November 1949). "Closed Pneumonolysis (Enucleation Technique)". Diseases of the Chest. XVI (5): 509–542. doi:10.1378/chest.16.5.509. PMID 15392666.
- Herben, George Foster (September 1951). "Maxwell Donnell Ryan: 1901 – 1950". Diseases of the Chest. XX (3): 345–346. doi:10.1016/S0096-0217(16)60024-9. PMID 14872747.
- Herben, George Foster (October 1954). "Letter" (PDF). High Fidelity. 4 (8). Audiocom, Inc.: 114, 132.

== Bibliography ==
- Clark, A. Howard, ed. (1914). "Register of New Members". National Year Book. National Society of the Sons of the American Revolution.
- Downs, Winfield Scott, ed. (1938). "Herben, Rev. Stephen Joseph". Encyclopedia of American Biography. New Series. New York: American Historical Society. pp. 129–131.
- Fraprie, Frank R. & Jordan, Franklin I., eds. (1943). "Silver Patriarch". The American Annual of Photography. 57. Boston: American Photographic Publishing Co.: 94, 207.
- Leonard, John William, ed. (1914–15). "Herben, Grace Foster (Mrs. Stephen J. Herben)". Woman's Who's who of America: A Biographical Dictionary of Contemporary Women of the United States and Canada. New York: American Commonwealth Co. pp. 382–383.
- The Scarlet Letter. New Brunswick, New Jersey: Rutgers College. May 1916.
