= Stephen J. Herben Jr. =

American philologist (1897–1967)

- Born: Stephen Joseph Herben Jr. March 14, 1897
- Died: December 22, 1967 (aged 70); Rosemont, Pennsylvania
- Years active: 1927–1967
- Title: Professor
- Spouse(s): Mary Bishop Shattuck (1921–1929); Caroline Robbins (1932–1967)
- Parent(s): Stephen J. Herben; Grace Foster Herben
- Relatives: George Foster Herben (brother)

Academic background
- Education: Rutgers University; Princeton University
- Thesis: The Hrolfs Saga Kraka and Related Materials for the Study of Beowulf (1924)

Academic work
- Discipline: English and Germanic Philology
- Institutions: Bryn Mawr College
- Notable works: "Arms and Armor in Chaucer" (1937)

Stephen Joseph Herben Jr. (14 March 1897 – 22 December 1967) was an American professor of philology at Bryn Mawr College. He specialized in English and German philology, and among other places did work at the American-Scandinavian Foundation in Copenhagen and Oxford University, as well as at Rutgers, Princeton, and Stanford University. His work included assistance with the etymological work of the second edition of Webster's New International Dictionary, and two articles on medieval literary descriptions of weapons and armor. The second of these articles, "Arms and Armour in Chaucer", is still considered a standard on the subject.

Herben was the son of Grace Foster Herben and Rev. Stephen Joseph Herben Sr., a Methodist missionary and minister, respectively. He married twice, to Mary Shattuck, another academic then beginning her career in psychology, from 1921 to 1929, and to Caroline Robbins, a professor of history at Bryn Mawr and the sister of Lionel Robbins, from 1932 until his death. He died at the age of 70, and has an endowed fund in his name at Bryn Mawr.

== Early life and education ==
Stephen Joseph Herben Jr. was born on 14 March 1897 to Grace Foster Herben and Stephen Joseph Herben Sr. He was the younger brother of George Foster Herben, who was born on 17 March 1893.

Like both his father and brother, Herben Jr. attended Evanston Academy in Illinois. In September 1914 he matriculated at Rutgers University. Two months later, earlier employment in the forestry commission came in useful when an estate on which he was hunting caught fire and he was put in charge of the volunteer firefighters. His graduation was delayed by the American intervention in World War I, for by May 1917 Herben Jr. had been made responsible for organizing an ambulance corps of twenty-five Rutgers students to be trained by the surgeon Fred H. Albee and serve in the war. On 5 August he sailed for Savenay, France, part of the Base Hospital Unit No. 8 Post Graduate Hospital, New York. A spell of scarlet fever in February landed him in the hospital as a patient, stricken enough that a letter home had to be dictated to a fellow Rutgers student, but in July he was sent back stateside via Ellis Island and granted a brief furlough to visit home. By October he was back in France; so too was his father, who had volunteered to serve as a chaplain with the American Red Cross. Herben Jr. was promoted to sergeant in November 1918, and discharged as disabled on 31 March 1919. He finally graduated from Rutgers in June 1920, with a Bachelor of Letters.

Herben Jr. graduated from Princeton University on 20 July 1922, with the award of a $1,000 fellowship by The American-Scandinavian Foundation. The following year he left for his fellowship at the University of Copenhagen with his newlywed wife, who helped with his research into the Scandinavian backdrop of the Anglo-Saxon epic Beowulf; two years later, following a second year abroad as a special coach in Old English at Oxford, his return occasioned headlines proclaiming that he had discovered the site of Heorot, the fabled mead hall and seat of King Hrothgar, where the hero Beowulf travels in search of the monster Grendel. A decade later, in 1935, a paper by Herben Jr. titled simply "Heorot" placed the hall northeast of Roskilde, on the basis of the place names Stor Hiort and Lille Hiorte on an 18th-century map; the suggestion went against the conventional belief that Heorot was based on a settlement at Lejre, and has been called "practically groundless".

== Career ==
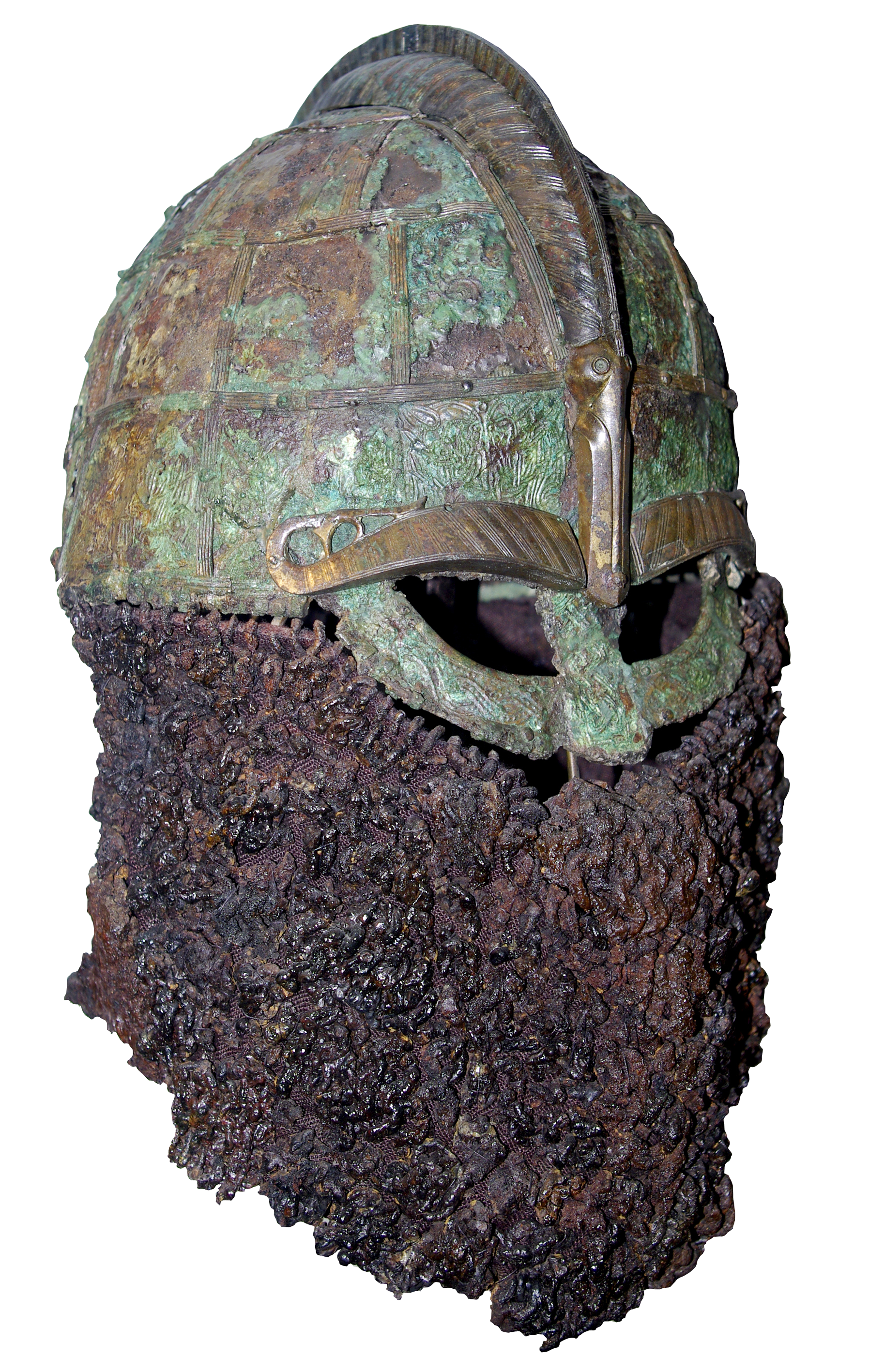
Herben Jr. linked the neck protection on the Valsgärde 8 helmet to descriptions of helmets in Beowulf.

From approximately 1925 until 1928, Herben Jr. taught English as an instructor, and then associate professor, at Princeton. A student later reminisced about his "happy melange of beer and literary discussion". The bulk of Herben Jr.'s career, however, was spent at Bryn Mawr College, where he taught for 34 years, until his retirement in 1962. At Bryn Mawr he was a professor of philology, specializing in English and German. He was put in charge of abstracting articles from philological journals for the 1934 release of Webster's New International Dictionary, in addition to his etymological work; the chief etymologist for the edition was Princeton professor Harold H. Bender, with whom Herben Jr., then still an instructor at Princeton, had written a 1927 article on the etymology of several English words rooted in German.

In 1937, Herben Jr., who himself had a collection of arms and armor from the Shakespearean era, published two articles on the literary descriptions of weapons and armor by the Beowulf poet and by Chaucer respectively. In "A Note on the Helm in Beowulf", Herben Jr. linked the neck protection on the recently excavated Valsgärde 6 and 8 helmets with the description of in the poem as "encircled with lordly chains". His other article, "Arms and Armor in Chaucer", aimed to "confirm impressions of [Chaucer's] realism and establish more firmly his existing claims as a dependable source for manners and customs in the fourteenth century". The article was one of Herben Jr.'s better-known publications, and was still regarded 75 years later, in 2012, as "a groundbreaking and most useful piece of research" and "perhaps ... the most familiar [analysis of contemporary arms and armor] within Chaucerian scholarship".

In 1946, Herben Jr. was chosen by the freshman class as their "class animal"—continuing a tradition in which the first years chose an animal, and the sophomores attempted to reveal it prior to the official unveiling. Three years later, in 1949, Herben Jr.'s teaching, which including a visiting stint at Stanford University, was interrupted by injuries sustained in a car accident. Driving from Williamsburg to Washington in February, he received, according to a former student who wrote to the Princeton Alumni Weekly, "a severe concussion and a bad shaking-up". Herben Jr. underwent surgery upon arrival at a hospital and remained unconscious for nearly a week; he eventually recovered enough to be moved to a hospital in Roxborough, Philadelphia, where he remained six weeks later. The former student wrote at the time that Herben Jr. was "still rather dazed", and that "[i]t is doubtful if he will be able to teach for a long time".

During his career, Herben Jr. also lectured at the University of Bonn and the Sorbonne. He retired in 1962 and became a professor emeritus. Upon this occasion, then-president of the college Katharine Elizabeth McBride remarked that he "was never willing to turn away a student who entered to learn".

== Personal life ==
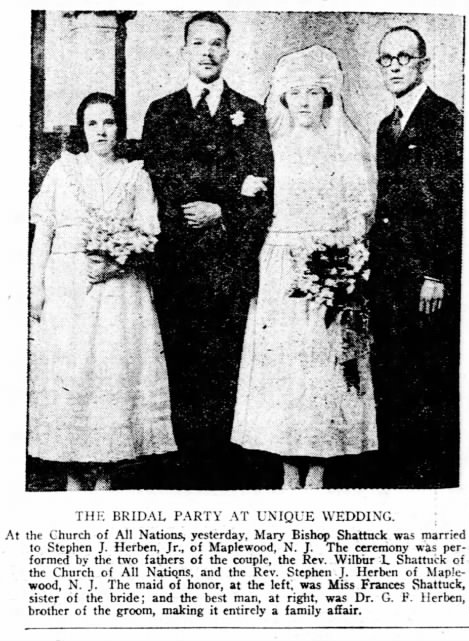
Wedding announcement in The Boston Post for Herben Jr. and Mary Bishop Shattuck

Herben Jr. married Mary Bishop Shattuck on 27 May 1921. She was herself the daughter of a minister, Rev. Willard Ide Shattuck, who together with Herben Jr.'s father performed the ceremony. The Boston Post dubbed it "entirely a family affair", for the best man was Herben Jr.'s brother, and the maid of honor Mary Shattuck's sister, Frances. Shattuck, who as Mary Fisher Langmuir would become recognized in the field of child psychology, went on to obtain her master's degree and doctorate from Columbia University, after which she lectured at New York University and served as the director of research at the Family Consultation Bureau of Columbia's Child Development Institute. The couple had two children, Mary Joan and Lysbeth, before Shattuck filed for divorce in 1929. The divorce was filed in Reno, Nevada, on 23 September; a notice in the Reno Evening Gazette the next day reported on the proceeding. (Note: Reno at the time was nationally known as a divorce haven, with permissive laws and a short three-month residency requirement. Statutes recognized seven grounds for divorce: impotency, adultery, desertion, criminal conviction, drunkenness, extreme cruelty, and neglect. Whether true or not, those seeking a divorce had to fit their request into those seven options. Cruelty, easiest to prove and least damaging to the defendant, was frequently invoked as a substitute for a no-fault divorce.) Shattuck was granted custody of both daughters, who upon her subsequent marriage to Willis Fisher took up the new surname.

On 21 September 1932, Herben Jr. married again, and his father again officiated. His new bride was Caroline Robbins, an associate professor of history at Bryn Mawr, and the brother of the economist Lionel Robbins. Marion Edwards Park, the president of the college, held the ceremony in her house.

Herben died on 22 December 1967, at his home in Rosemont, Pennsylvania. He was survived by his wife and six grandchildren, including the geologist and author Sarah Andrews. A fund for the purchase of history materials was established in his name, and that of Howard L. Gray, at Bryn Mawr by Mary O. Slingluff of the class of 1931. One of Herben Jr.'s books, a rare 1617 copy of The Faerie Queen; The Shepheards Calendar: Together with the Other Works of England's Arch-Poët, Edm. Spenser signed by John Dryden, was bequeathed at his death to Julia McGrew of Vassar College's Department of English, who subsequently donated it to the school.

== Publications ==
- Herben, Stephen J. Jr. (1924). The Hrolfs Saga Kraka and Related Materials for the Study of Beowulf (Ph.D.). Princeton University.
- Bender, Harold H. & Herben, Stephen J. Jr. (1927). "English Spick, Speck, Spitchcock, and Spike". The American Journal of Philology. XLVIII (3). Johns Hopkins University Press: 258–262. doi:10.2307/290130. JSTOR 290130.
- Herben, Stephen J. Jr. (January 1935a). "The Vercelli Book: A New Hypothesis". Speculum. X (1). The Mediaeval Academy of America: 91–94. doi:10.2307/2848240. JSTOR 2848240. S2CID 163050523.
- Herben, Stephen J. Jr. (December 1935b). "Heorot". Publications of the Modern Language Association. L (4). Modern Language Association: 933–945. doi:10.2307/458100. JSTOR 458100. S2CID 251023136.
- Herben, Stephen J. Jr. (January 1937a). "A Note on the Helm in Beowulf". Modern Language Notes. LII (1). Johns Hopkins University Press: 34–36. doi:10.2307/2912312. JSTOR 2912312.
- Herben, Stephen J. Jr. (January 1937b). "Rare Books in the Library". Bryn Mawr Alumnae Bulletin. XVII (1). Bryn Mawr Alumnae Association: 2–4.
- Herben, Stephen J. Jr. (October 1937c). "Arms and Armour in Chaucer". Speculum. 12 (4). University of Chicago Press: 475–487. doi:10.2307/2849302. JSTOR 2849302. S2CID 162914295.
- Herben, Stephen J. Jr. (December 1938). "Knight's Tale, a 1881 ff". Modern Language Notes. LIII (8). Johns Hopkins University Press: 595. doi:10.2307/2912967. JSTOR 2912967.
- Herben, Stephen J. Jr. (January 1939). "The Ruin". Modern Language Notes. LIV (1). Johns Hopkins University Press: 37–39. doi:10.2307/2911804. JSTOR 2911804.
- Herben, Stephen J. Jr. (January 1944). "The Ruin Again". Modern Language Notes. LIX (1). Johns Hopkins University Press: 72–74. doi:10.2307/2911374. JSTOR 2911374.
- Herben, Stephen J. Jr. (Autumn 1963). "A Shakespearian Limerick". Shakespeare Quarterly. XIV (4). Folger Shakespeare Library: 481. doi:10.2307/2868198. JSTOR 2868198.

== Bibliography ==
- Andrews, Sarah (2004). Earth Colors. New York: St. Martin's Press. ISBN 0-312-99770-1.
- Cramp, Rosemary J. (1957). "Beowulf and Archaeology" (PDF). Medieval Archaeology. 1. Society for Medieval Archaeology: 57–77. doi:10.1080/00766097.1957.11735382.
- Darlington, Beth (February 1970). "Vassar Receives a Rich Legacy". Vassar Alumnae Magazine. LV (3). Associate Alumnae of Vassar College: 4–8.
- Downs, Winfield Scott, ed. (1938). "Herben, Rev. Stephen Joseph". Encyclopedia of American Biography. New Series. New York: American Historical Society. pp. 129–131.
- Harris, Joseph (2014). "A Note on the Other Heorot". In Neidorf, Leonard (ed.). The Dating of Beowulf: A Reassessment. Cambridge: D. S. Brewer. pp. 178–190. ISBN 978-1-84384-387-0.
- Howson, Susan (2011). Lionel Robbins. Cambridge: Cambridge University Press. ISBN 978-1-107-00244-9.
- Howson, Susan; Moggridge, Donald, eds. (1990). "Lionel Robbins: Hot Springs and After, May–June 1943". The Wartime Diaries of Lionel Robbins and James Meade, 1943–45. Basingstoke: Palgrave Macmillan. pp. 8–91. ISBN 978-1-349-10842-8.
- Hughes, Gavin (2012). "Fourteenth-Century Weaponry, Armour and Warfare in Chaucer and Sir Gawain and the Green Knight". In Morgan, Gerald (ed.). Chaucer in Context: A Golden Age of English Poetry. New York: Peter Lang. pp. 83–108. ISBN 978-3-03-430765-9.
- Leonard, John William, ed. (1914–15). "Herben, Grace Foster (Mrs. Stephen J. Herben)". Woman's Who's who of America: A Biographical Dictionary of Contemporary Women of the United States and Canada. New York: American Commonwealth Co. pp. 382–383.
- Osborn, Marijane (2007). "The Lejre Connection in Beowulf Scholarship" (PDF). In Niles, John D. & Osborn, Marijane (eds.). Beowulf and Lejre. Medieval and Renaissance Texts and Studies. Vol. 323. Tempe: Arizona Center for Medieval and Renaissance Studies. pp. 287–293. ISBN 978-0-86698-368-6.
- Smith, George (1998). "Tribute to Caroline Robbins" (PDF). The Bulletin of the Radnor Historical Society. VI (8): 27–28.
