= Harold Bender =

Harold Bender may refer to:

- Harold H. Bender (1882–1951), professor of philology at Princeton University
- Harold S. Bender (1897–1962), professor of theology at Goshen College and Goshen Biblical Seminary
