= Hog farm =

Hog farm may refer to:

- Pig farming
  - Intensive pig farming, modern large-scale farming of domestic pigs
- Hog Farm, America's longest running hippie commune
- "Hog Farm", English title of a 1974 Swedish song by Pugh Rogefeldt
