= Jonathan Foster =

Jonathan Foster may refer to:

== People ==
- Jonathan Foster (neuroscientist), attended Wolfson College, Oxford
- Jonathan Foster (engineer), see Timeline of steam power
- Jonathan Foster (politician), predecessor of Jonathan Sloane
- Jonathan Foster (American football), played in 2009 Cleveland Browns season
- Jonathan Foster (musician) (born 1979), singer-songwriter

== Fictional characters ==
- Jonny Foster, Jonathan Foster, Emmerdale character
- Jonathan Foster, character in 12 Monkeys (TV series)

== See also ==
- Jon Foster (disambiguation)
- John Foster (disambiguation)
