= John Forster =

'John Forster may refer to:

- Sir John Forster (soldier) (1520–1602), English military commander and warden of the Middle Marches
- John Forster (biographer) (1812–1876), English biographer and critic
- John Forster (MP) (1817–1878), British politician, MP for Oxford
- John Forster (Irish judge) (1667–1720), Irish lawyer and politician
- John Forster (colonial administrator) (died 1748), British administrator and president of Bengal
- John Cooper Forster (1823–1886), British surgeon
- Juan Forster (1814–1882), born John, California landowner
- John Wycliffe Lowes Forster (1850–1938), Canadian artist
- John Forster, 1st Baron Forster of Harraby (1888–1972), British barrister
- John Foster (died 1558), or Forster, English politician
- John Forster (footballer) (born 1948), Australian footballer
- John Forster (musician) (born 1948), American cabaret musician
- John Forster (British Army officer) (1856–1938), British Army officer

== See also ==
- Jack Forster (born 1987), English rugby union player
- Johann Reinhold Forster (1729–1798), German naturalist
- John Foster (disambiguation)
