= Come Wander with Me =

- The Twilight Zone episode
- Episode no.: Season 5 Episode 34
- Directed by: Richard Donner
- Written by: Anthony Wilson
- Original air date: May 22, 1964

Guest appearances
- Gary Crosby: Floyd Burney; Bonnie Beecher: Mary Rachel; John Bolt: Billy Rayford; Hank Patterson: Old Man

Episode chronology
← Previous "The Brain Center at Whipple's"	Next → "The Fear"
- The Twilight Zone (1959 TV series) (season 5)

"Come Wander with Me" is the 154th episode of the American television series The Twilight Zone. It was the last episode produced in the original run, although two episodes (including the finale "The Bewitchin' Pool") were broadcast after this one. This episode introduced Bonnie Beecher in her television debut.

== Opening narration ==
Mr. Floyd Burney, a gentleman songster in search of song, is about to answer the age-old question of whether a man can be in two places at the same time. As far as his folk song is concerned, we can assure Mr. Burney he'll find everything he's looking for, although the lyrics may not be all to his liking. But that's sometimes the case - when the words and music are recorded in the Twilight Zone.

== Plot ==
The "Rock-A-Billy Kid", Floyd Burney, arrives at a small town in search of a new song. He is directed to a dilapidated shop in the woods run by a reclusive old man. After his offer of money in exchange for an original song is rebuffed, Floyd hears a voice singing and wanders off through the woods to find the singer, not seeing a nearby tombstone inscribed with his name "Floyd Burney, the Wandering Man."

In the foggy woods, Floyd twice passes a woman in a black shawl, whom he fails to see. Next to a lake, he encounters the singer, Mary Rachel, who reluctantly plays a song for him about two lovers who meet in the woods. Floyd offers to buy the song rights, but she claims it isn't for sale. By seducing her, he convinces her to sing part of the song into his tape recorder. As Mary Rachel sings, the mysterious woman in black is watching. This woman appears to be a mourning Mary Rachel.

Sometime later, a young man named Billy Rayford shows up with a rifle. "The Rayford brothers" have been mentioned in the song and Mary Rachel has said that she is "bespoke" unto Billy Rayford. Billy accuses Floyd of seducing his intended bride and tries to take Floyd back to his brothers, but Floyd resists. He accidentally kills Rayford and starts the tape recorder playing. The recording has a new verse that Mary Rachel hadn't previously sung. The new verse reflects the event that just happened ("You killed Billy Rayford/ 'neath an old willow tree..."), and foreshadows a future attack. Floyd runs off, dragging Mary Rachel with him while she tries to convince him to stay.

Mary Rachel sings a new verse of the song where Billy Rayford's three brothers find Billy's body, mourn his death near the lake, and vow to avenge Billy. As Floyd prepares to flee, Mary Rachel begs him to stay, hoping things will be different "this time". She implies that these same events have occurred many times before, but when he suggests that she has been with different men, she says it is always Floyd. As Floyd runs away, he looks back and sees that Mary Rachel is now dressed in black, with a black shawl, mourning, and professing her love for Floyd.

Floyd makes it back to the shop in the woods where the old man declines to help him hide. Floyd clubs the old man over the head, then hides among the musical instruments. When he bumps a music box, it starts playing, and soon all the instruments in the shop are chiming, ringing, or clanging. The three Rayford brothers arrive, see the old man's body, and close in on Floyd. As Floyd is shot, the camera returns to the tombstone in the first scene, thus fulfilling the prophecy within the song that Floyd would die.

== Closing narration ==
In retrospect, it may be said of Mr. Floyd Burney that he achieved that final dream of the performer: eternal top-name billing, not on the fleeting billboards of the entertainment world, but forever recorded among the folk songs of the Twilight Zone.

== Production notes ==
According to The Twilight Zone Companion, Liza Minnelli auditioned for the role of Mary Rachel, but was so nervous during the audition she was rejected. Although this was the third-to-last episode broadcast, this was the last episode in the series to be filmed. (The last original episode to be broadcast was "The Bewitchin' Pool". The last episode to be broadcast during the original run—as a repeat—was "The Jeopardy Room".)

In an interview, episode director Richard Donner stated he thought Bonnie Beecher "was going to become a very important actress" and asserted that he (not fifth season producer William Froug) selected Beecher over Minnelli for the role because he thought she was "incredible."

According to The Twilight Zone: The 50th Anniversary Tribute, by Carol Serling and Douglas Brode, in this episode which aired May 22, 1964, "Gary Crosby played the first Bob Dylan-style 'folkie' to appear on the small screen."

Contrasted against writer Anthony Wilson's other writing and production efforts, the episode is tersely described as "poor" in Irwin Allen Television Productions, 1964-1970, and as possessing "twists and turns that render it virtually incoherent" in The Twilight Zone Companion.

=== The song ("Come Wander With Me") ===
The song "Come Wander With Me" was composed by Jeff Alexander and Anthony Wilson and sung by actress Bonnie Beecher. The song intertwines with the story, building verse by verse alongside the events in the episode. Parts of the lyrics are not complete, since two of the ten verses are not sung in full. However, the song has been used in several places since its 1964 broadcast:

- Alexander himself used an instrumental version of "Come Wander With Me" as part of his score for Jerry Thorpe's 1968 western Day of the Evil Gun.
- The original song (as sung by Bonnie Beecher) was featured on the soundtrack of Vincent Gallo's 2003 film The Brown Bunny, included on the compilation Late Night Tales: Air, used in the 2024 Netflix miniseries Baby Reindeer, and used as background music in Belgian director Koen Mortier's 2006 television commercial for Dutch insurance company RVS, which shows flying men with open umbrellas.
