= Jon Foster (disambiguation) =

Jon Foster (born 1984) is an American actor.

Jon Foster may also refer to:

- Jon Foster (artist), American freelance illustrator, penciler, and sculptor
- Jon Foster (British actor), see List of EastEnders characters
- Jonny Foster, fictional character

== See also ==
- John Foster (disambiguation)
- Jonathan Foster (disambiguation)
