= Echo Helstrom =

High school girlfriend of Bob Dylan

Helstrom's yearbook pictures for 1957 (left) and 1958 (right)

Echo Star Helstrom (1942 – 2018) was Bob Dylan's high-school girlfriend in Hibbing, Minnesota. She met Dylan (then Bob Zimmerman) in 11th grade, and they were romantically involved for about one year. She was an influence on Dylan's development during his teen years in Hibbing, was a source for information on Dylan's early years, and may have inspired one or more of his songs.

== Early years in Hibbing ==
Helstrom was a free-spirited blonde from the poorer outskirts of town, compared to the middle-class Zimmermans. She was the third child of Matt Helstrom and his wife Martha; Matt Helstrom was a mechanic, painter and welder. Echo Helstrom had a brother and a sister, but they were 14 and 15 years older than she. Zimmerman and Helstrom were a couple in 1957 and 1958, and went to the junior prom together.

In his memoir Chronicles: Volume One, Dylan refers to Helstrom (not by name but by clear implication) as "...my Becky Thatcher". In Chronicles, Dylan also writes "Everyone said she looked like Brigitte Bardot, and she did", and Dylan stated in a 1961 interview "I dedicated my first song to Brigitte Bardot." And at one of Dylan’s first public performances, in his high school auditorium, he sang a song beginning "I got a girl and her name is Echo..."

20 below zero, and running down the road in the rain with yo' ol' man's flashlight on my ass... when we sat and talked in the L&B (Note: The L & B Café was a diner in Hibbing.) 'til two o'clock at night... Let me tell you that your beauty is second to none, but I think I told you that before. Well, Echo, I'd better make it. Love to the most beautiful girl in school – Bob.

— Robert Zimmerman, inscription in Echo Helstrom's 1958 yearbook (excerpt)

Dylan and Helstrom together listened to rhythm-and-blues coming from long-distance radio stations in Chicago, Little Rock, and Shreveport. Dylan also recounts in Chronicles that "One of the reasons I’d go [to Helstrom’s house]... was that they had old Jimmie Rodgers records, old 78s in the house." Helstrom herself recounted "[H]e had my father's huge collection of bound folk music to peruse. He'd sit for hours leafing through old manuscripts, sheet music and folk magazines".

Dylan biographer Toby Thompson formed a good friendship with Helstrom, who was a major source for Thompson's book Positively Main Street: Bob Dylan's Minnesota.

I don't know what [Dylan] would have done if he didn’t find someone like himself. She had that spirit, that electricity that was comparable to his. She was wild in a way that he wanted to be wild... I’ve always felt that her support of Dylan in the netherland of Hibbing, and their shared experience as, at least, cultural outsiders, helped him enormously.

— Toby Thompson

== Girl from the North Country ==
Helstrom has been frequently cited as the inspiration for Dylan’s classic folk ballad "Girl from the North Country". This identification, however, is speculative; other suggested candidates for the song's subject include Bonnie Beecher, Suze Rotolo, and others, or the song may have not been inspired by any particular person.

Toby Thompson has stated that Helstrom is probably the Girl, while Dylan expert John Bushey, longtime host of the Minneapolis radio show Highway 61 Revisited, also leans to Helstrom. Clinton Heylin (Revolution in the Air: The Songs of Bob Dylan, Vol. 1: 1957–73) is skeptical, saying that Helstrom "laid it on thick" for Thompson, but cites evidence on both sides of the question (Heylin acknowledges that Dylan did introduce "Girl From the North Country" at a 1978 show with "First girl I ever loved is in the house tonight, I wrote a song about her..." when Helstrom was apparently indeed in attendance, but also provides some contrary indicators, such as Dylan saying the same thing when Helstrom was not in the house), while Robert Shelton (No Direction Home: The Life and Music of Bob Dylan), favors Bonnie Beecher as the Girl.

Dylan, when asked point-blank in 1986 whether Helstrom was the Girl, characteristically prevaricated with an answer of only "Well, she's a north country girl through and through".

Dylan expert Michael Gray averred in The Bob Dylan Encyclopedia that, in his opinion, Helstrom was likely, at least in part, an inspiration for Dylan's song "Hazel".

== Later life ==
Helstrom later moved to Minneapolis, where she worked as a booker for National General Pictures; there she was married briefly (her married name was Echo Helstrom Casey) and had a daughter, then in the 1970s moved to Los Angeles, where she worked as a secretary at movie studios.

Helstrom had health problems including chronic fatigue syndrome and died in California in 2018.
