= Girl from the North Country =

1963 song by Bob Dylan

Song by Bob Dylan

from the album The Freewheelin' Bob Dylan
- Released: May 27, 1963
- Recorded: April 24, 1963
- Studio: Columbia, New York City
- Genre: Folk
- Length: 3:22
- Label: Columbia
- Songwriter: Bob Dylan
- Producer: John H. Hammond

"Girl from the North Country" (occasionally known as "Girl of the North Country") is a song written by Bob Dylan. It was recorded at Columbia Recording Studios in New York City in April 1963, and released the following month as the second track on Dylan's second studio album, The Freewheelin' Bob Dylan.

A large amount of writing and journalistic research has been devoted to trying to ascertain the true identity of who the "Girl" from the North Country might be, and has often been associated with one of Dylan's early girlfriends. It continues to be debated as to whom this song is a tribute to. Some claim former girlfriend Echo Helstrom, and some Bonnie Beecher, both of whom Dylan knew before leaving for New York. However, it is suspected that this song could have been inspired by his New York girlfriend, Suze Rotolo.

"Girl from the North Country" has been featured on several different albums by Dylan over the years, in different versions and occasional duets. According to Dylan's own official website, Dylan performed the song 569 times live between 1963 and 2019. The song has had over two dozen covers by significant artists over the decades since its original release. Dylan re-recorded the song as a duet with Johnny Cash in February 1969. This recording became the opening track on Nashville Skyline, Dylan's ninth studio album.

== Background ==
The song was written following Dylan's first trip to England in December 1962, upon what he thought to be the completion of his second album. It is debated as to whom this song is a tribute: some claim former girlfriend Echo Helstrom, and some Bonnie Beecher, both of whom Dylan knew before leaving for New York. However, it is suspected that this song could have been inspired by his then girlfriend, Suze Rotolo.

In an interview with Anthony Scaduto included in his book The Dylan Tapes: Friends, Players and Lovers Talkin Early Bob Dylan, Echo Helstrom is quoted as answering:

Scaduto: You know there's one thing I forget to ask you the last time we talked -- "The Girl from the North Country"?
Helstrom: Yeah.
Scaduto: So you think you're the girl from the north country?
Helstrom: Yeah.
Scaduto: Tell me about it. Tell me your feeling about it. Why do you think you're the girl from the north country?
Helstrom: Well, there's nobody else it could be. He didn't go with anyone else when he went with me, you know, for such a long time.

Dylan left England for Italy to search for Rotolo, whose continuation of studies there had caused a serious rift in their relationship. Unbeknownst to Dylan, she had already returned to the United States, leaving about the same time that he arrived in Italy. It was there that he finished the song, ostensibly inspired by the apparent end of his relationship with Rotolo. Upon his return to New York in mid-January, he persuaded her to get back together, and to move back into his apartment on 4th Street. Rotolo is the woman featured on the album cover, walking arm in arm with Dylan down Jones Street, not far from their apartment. In her introduction to the Scaduto book of interviews, Stephanie Trudeau states that Rotolo was the likely inspiration for the related Dylan song "Boots of Spanish Leather".

In his book about Dylan, Howard Sounes offers the opinion that Dylan may have been utilizing the largely autobiographical song as a way to gain favor with different girlfriends whom he dated over the years. Sounes states: "... one wondered which girlfriend Bob was singing about... Bob later gave Echo (Helstrom) the impression (that it) was her song. But, no doubt thinking that women were flattered by having songs written about them, Bob led another north country girlfriend, Bonnie Beecher, to think the same... Later in 1963, when he performed the song on a radio show... Bob indicated that the song was about an idealized woman, saying, 'This is dedicated to all the north country girls.'"

== Composition ==
While in London, Dylan met several figures in the local folk scene, including English folksinger Martin Carthy. "I ran into some people in England who really knew those [traditional English] songs," Dylan recalled in 1984. "Martin Carthy, another guy named [Bob] Davenport. Martin Carthy's incredible. I learned a lot of stuff from Martin." Carthy exposed Dylan to a repertoire of traditional English ballads, including Carthy's own arrangement of "Scarborough Fair", which Dylan drew upon for aspects of the melody and lyrics of "Girl from the North Country", including the line from the refrain "Remember me to one who lives there, she once was a true love of mine". Musically, this song is nearly identical to his composition "Boots of Spanish Leather", composed and recorded one year later for the album The Times They Are a-Changin' (1964).

Todd Harvey notes that Dylan not only took the tune of "Scarborough Fair", which he learned from Martin Carthy in London, but also adapted the theme of that song. "Scarborough Fair" derives from "The Elfin Knight" (Child Ballad Number 2), which was first transcribed in 1670. In the song, a supernatural character poses a series of questions to an innocent, requesting her to perform impossible tasks. Harvey points out that Dylan "retains the idea of the listener being sent upon a task, a northern place setting, and an antique lyric quality".

Carthy actually taught Dylan two English songs that would prove important for the Freewheelin' album. The second was a 19th-century ballad commemorating the death of Sir John Franklin in 1847, "Lady Franklin's Lament", which gave Dylan the melody for his composition "Bob Dylan's Dream". Both songs displayed Dylan's fast-growing ability to take traditional melodies and use them as a basis for highly personal songwriting.

From England, Dylan traveled to Italy, and joined Albert Grossman, who was touring with his client Odetta. Dylan was also hoping to make contact with his girlfriend, Suze Rotolo, unaware that she had already left Italy and was on her way back to New York. Dylan worked on his new material, and when he returned to London, Martin Carthy received a surprise:

When he came back from Italy, he'd written "Girl From the North Country"; he came down to the Troubadour and said, "Hey, here's 'Scarborough Fair'" and he started playing this thing.

== Lyrics ==
Tom Leatham summarizes the lyrics of the song in an article about its duet by Dylan and Johnny Cash stating: "The track tells of a mystery woman and both Cash and Dylan sing of their longing for her. The song had first been written by Dylan when he visited England late in 1962 when he had been completing his second album. Many Dylan fans have deliberated on who the mystery woman in the song really is, with some suggesting it could have been any of his former girlfriends, Echo Helstrom, Bonnie Beecher or Suze Rotolo." The fourth verse was not included in the duet version with Cash from 1969. Instead, the opening verse is repeated twice at the end. The duet version also switches places between verses two and three, compared to the 1963 solo version.

Robert McColl writing for Popular Music History writes of the lyrics as expressing Dylan being divided between his actual memories of having seen his girlfriend and having had an encounter with her, with his later attempt to create a mental reconstruction of her long after the encounter. As McColl states: "The song becomes, in part, about the difference between the mental image and the actual seeing. Among his many attributes, Dylan is an exemplary stopper and cutter-short: what the singer cannot see, here, he desists from imagining. This is a trend best exemplified by the penultimate verse":

I'm a-wond'rin' if she remembers me at all
Many times I've often prayed
In the darkness of my night
In the brightness of my day

McColl continues stating: "If verses two and three project the hanging of remembrance upon a single image—coat, and hair, respectively—we might expect the pattern to continue through the song, reconstructing the girl, so to speak, through parts. But verse four turns the tables, supplying no concrete image and questioning the viability of such a reconstruction, primarily of himself ('if she remembers me at all') but, to some extent, of her as well. We might assume that he prays for her to remember him, but are denied the luxury of that thought." Richard F. Thomas in his book about Dylan commented about the originality of lyrics of the song irrespective of the melody's similarity to British folk songs stating: "The melody and much of the beauty of the song come from... the British folk song Dylan had heard in London... but the lyrics are all Dylan and are what bring this song to life".

In an interview between Dylan, Tony Glover and Paul Nelson, Dylan commented on the meaning of the lyrics of the song to him stating: "You put down (to Glover)... 'Girl From The North Country'. I think 'Girl From The North Country' is beautiful. Not because I wrote it. [Girl: Play it.] I'll play it. I feel very close to that. I wrote that song with somebody else who knew what it was all about [Dylan plays the song]. 'Please see for me if her hair hangs long.' Man, [that]'s a gut-pulling line for me... and I wouldn't write it, if not. I was thinking about the whole thing, I'm not thinking [of] 'yonder sits a little magpie' as a love song. I can't think of a love song as this and that."

== Recording sessions ==
All of the songs for the album recording of Freewheelin' took place from April 1962 to April 1963, and the album was assembled from eight recording sessions at Columbia Records Studio A, located at 799 Seventh Avenue in New York City. According to Nat Hentoff, the date for the recording of "Girl from the North Country" was April 24, 1963.

== Release ==
"Girl From the North Country" was released as the second track on The Freewheelin' Bob Dylan album (May 1963). According to Scaduto, unlike his debut LP, it was an immediate success, selling 10,000 copies per month and bringing Dylan a monthly income of about $2,500 (equivalent to $26,300 in 2025). An article by Nat Hentoff on folk music appeared in the June issue of Playboy magazine and devoted considerable space to Dylan's achievements, calling him "the most vital of the younger citybillies."

== Reception ==
Rolling Stone magazine ranked the song 30th on a list of the "100 Greatest Bob Dylan Songs". In an article accompanying the list, Rolling Stones guitarist Keith Richards wrote: "While the British Invasion was going on, Bob Dylan was the man who really pulled the American point of view back into focus. At the same time, he had been drawing on Anglo-Celtic folk songs, and that's certainly true of 'Girl From the North Country'. It's got all the elements of beautiful folk writing without being pretentious. In the lyrics and the melody, there is an absence of Bob's later cutting edge. There's none of that resentment. He recorded it again later with Johnny Cash, but I don't think it's a duo song. Bob got it right the first time".

Clinton Heylin mentions in his book a dispute between Dylan and Paul Nelson for mentioning personal details about his girlfriend in one of his reviews quoting Dylan as stating: "When you reviewed my record you mentioned Dylan wrote this song when his girlfriend went to Italy. I wish you['d] never done that, because that's... too personal. It's like me telling [about] something in your life, that means something to you [but] I know nothing about... It's not right. It's a sickness, and you don't dwell on people's sickness... That's the only thing in the article I disagree with, [pertaining] to me."

== Live performances ==
According to his official website, Dylan performed the song 569 times live between 1963 and 2019. During a live performance of the song in Oakland in November 1978, Clinton Heylin reports that Dylan "dedicated a live rendition to a north-country girl in the audience... That girl was Bonnie (Beecher)". Live performances by Dylan appear on the albums Real Live (1984), The 30th Anniversary Concert Celebration (1993; recorded 1992), The Bootleg Series Vol. 13: Trouble No More 1979–1981 (Deluxe Edition) (2017; recorded 1981), Live 1962-1966: Rare Performances From The Copyright Collections (2018; recorded 1964), and The Bootleg Series Vol. 15: Travelin' Thru, 1967-1969 (Deluxe Edition) (2019; recorded 1969). A February 1964 performance for Canadian television was included on the DVD release of Martin Scorsese's PBS television documentary on Dylan, No Direction Home in 2005.

In reference to Dylan's 2013 Rome performance on his European tour, Richard F. Thomas in his book on Dylan commented that: "Two of the songs he performed in Rome, "Girl of the North Country" and "Boots of Spanish Leather", bring in a further dimension. These two songs had been written... in Italy in early 1963, both with rich folk music traditions behind them, and if any single woman is behind 'Girl of the North Country', she probably came from where the song put her, up in... Minnesota. But their lyrics were also inextricably linked to Dylan's relationship with Suze Rotolo, whose absence had helped generate those songs fifty years before the Rome Concerts. Suze dies on February 25, 2011, so perhaps Dylan's performance of 'Boots...' in Rome was also a tribute to her. Whether or not that is so, only one person knows, and we're unlikely to hear from him on that score".

== Personnel ==
The personnel for the album release is listed as:

- Bob Dylan – acoustic guitar, harmonica, vocals

Technical

- John H. Hammond – production
- Nat Hentoff – liner notes
- Don Hunstein – album cover photographer
- Tom Wilson – production

== Charts ==
Charts for response to album for The Freewheelin' Bob Dylan from 1963:

Chart (1963)	Peak position
US Billboard 200	22
Chart (1965)	Peak position
UK Albums Chart	1
Chart (2020)	Peak position
Portuguese Albums (AFP)	33

Charts for response to Nashville Skyline in 1969:

Year	Chart	Peak position
1969	Billboard 200	3
1969	Cash Box Album Charts	3
1969	Record World Album Charts	1
1969	Spanish Albums Chart	4
1969	UK Top 75	1

== Certifications ==
Region	Certification	Certified units/sales
New Zealand (RMNZ)	Gold	15,000^{‡}
^{‡} Sales+streaming figures based on certification alone.

== Notable versions ==
- Johnny Cash recorded a duet of the song with Dylan in February 1969 while Dylan was in Nashville working on his ninth studio album Nashville Skyline. The duet was released as the album's first track in April 1969. This version appears in the 2012 film Silver Linings Playbook starring Bradley Cooper and Jennifer Lawrence. This version with new orchestral arrangements by the Royal Philharmonic Orchestra also appears on Cash's 2020 posthumous album Johnny Cash and the Royal Philharmonic Orchestra.
- Cash and Dylan performed a duet of the song on The Johnny Cash Show, June 6, 1969.
- Joe Cocker and Leon Russell performed the song on the 1970 live album Mad Dogs and Englishmen. Russell also performed the song on his 1970 live album at the Fillmore East.
- Altan performed this song on their album Another Sky.
- Rosanne Cash included the song on her 2009 album The List, which is based on a list of 100 country songs her father Johnny Cash recommended to her as "essential".
- Counting Crows covered the song on their 2013 live album Echoes of the Outlaw Roadshow.
- Eels perform a slowed down, live, acoustic version on Eels with Strings: Live at Town Hall as well as The Myspace Transmissions Session 2009.
- Roy Harper recorded his version of the song on his 1974 album Valentine.
- Tom Northcott's 1968 single charted at #65 in Canada.
- Rod Stewart also covered this song on his 1974 album Smiler.
- Stephen Stills performed the song on his 2009 album Live at Shepherd's Bush, and recorded a version with Judy Collins on their 2017 album Everybody Knows.
- Sting covered the song for Chimes of Freedom: Songs of Bob Dylan Honoring 50 Years of Amnesty International.
- Neil Young released a cover of this song on his 2014 album A Letter Home.
- The Lions covered the song for the soundtrack to Sons of Anarchy, released in 2009.
- Leo Kottke covered the song in a recorded performance at No Exit Coffeehouse in 1969.
- Conor Oberst, M. Ward and Jim James performed the song as part of Bright Eyes' concert on Austin City Limits in 2004.
- Passenger covered the song on his compilation album Sunday Night Sessions.
- A Tobin Bell cover was made for the 2021 film Spiral but was cut.
- Jonathan Foster covered the song, which features National Fiddler Hall of Famer Scott Joss, on his 2019 album Wildlife.
- Jackson Dean and Josh Ross covered the song and released it as a "Spotify Single" in 2023.
- Swedish singer-songwriter Björn Afzelius made a cover with his own Swedish text,"Flickan från landet i norr", first released on the live album "Danska Nätter" in 1982.

== Popular culture ==
In 2017, a stage play was written titled Girl from the North Country and performed in England. Irish playwright Conor McPherson wrote and directed it, and used Dylan's songs to tell the stories of various characters during the Depression years, set in Dylan's birthplace, Duluth, Minnesota, and features the title song in the second act. The play premiered in London in 2017.

== See also ==
- List of Bob Dylan songs based on earlier tunes

== Bibliography ==
- Heylin, Clinton (1996). Bob Dylan: A Life In Stolen Moments: Day by Day 1941–1995. Schirmer Books. ISBN 0-7119-5669-3.
- Heylin, Clinton (2021). The Double Life of Bob Dylan. Little, Brown, and Company.
- Sounes, Howard (2001). Down the Highway. Grove Press.
- Thomas, Richard (2017). Why Bob Dylan Matters. HarperCollins.
