= Saint Misbehavin': The Wavy Gravy Movie =

- Film poster
- Directed by: Michelle Esrick
- Produced by: D.A. Pennebaker
- Starring: Wavy Gravy; Ram Dass; Larry Brilliant; Michael Lang
- Release date: 2009
- Running time: 87 minutes
- Country: United States
- Language: English

Saint Misbehavin': The Wavy Gravy Movie is a 2009 documentary about hippie icon and entertainer Wavy Gravy.

== Critical reception ==
The Village Voice, "Michelle Esrick’s film draws heavily on the image bank to take the young Romney from Village poetry sessions circa 1959 through his Zelig-like manifestations with Dylan, the Merry Pranksters, the Hog Farm, and Woodstock, before his final ascension into clown white."
