= Wavy Gravy =

American entertainer and peace activist (born 1936)

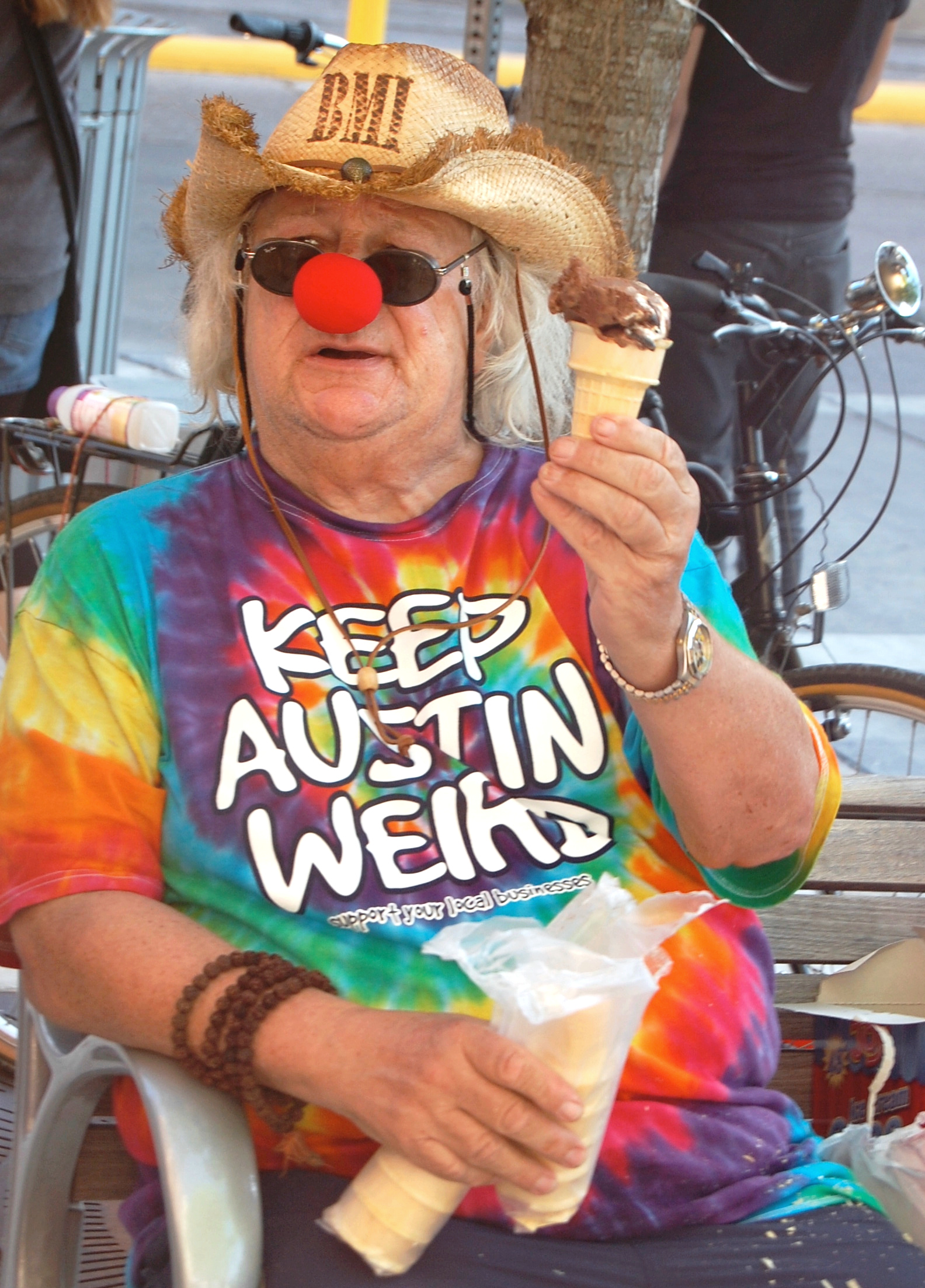
- Wavy Gravy in 2009
- Born: Hugh Nanton Romney Jr. May 15, 1936 (age 90); East Greenbush, New York, U.S.
- Occupations: Activist; Comic
- Spouse: Bonnie Beecher (m. 1965)
- Children: 1
- Website: wavygravy.net

Hugh Nanton Romney Jr. (born May 15, 1936), known as Wavy Gravy, is an American entertainer and peace activist best known for his role at Woodstock, as well as for his hippie persona and countercultural beliefs.

Romney has founded or co-founded several organizations, including the activist commune the Hog Farm, and later, as Wavy Gravy, Camp Winnarainbow and the Seva Foundation. He founded the Phurst Church of Phun in the 1960s, a secret society of comics and clowns that aimed to support the ending of the Vietnam War through political theater, and has adopted a clown persona in support of his political activism, and more generally as a form of entertainment work, including as the official clown of the Grateful Dead.

As Wavy Gravy, he has had two radio shows on Sirius Satellite Radio's Jam On station. A documentary film based on his life, Saint Misbehavin': The Wavy Gravy Movie, was released in late 2010 to generally positive reviews. Romney was awarded the Kate Wolf Memorial Award by the World Folk Music Association in 1992.

== Early life and education ==
Romney was born in East Greenbush, New York. His father, Hugh Romney Sr., was an architect. Romney was raised in early life in Princeton, New Jersey, and by middle school age his family moved to West Hartford, Connecticut. He attended William Hall High School, graduating in 1954. After high school graduation, he volunteered for the United States Army, serving as a sign painter, to take advantage of the G.I. Bill. He was honorably discharged after 22 months.

Romney entered Boston University Theater Department in the late 1950s under the G.I. Bill, and then attended the Neighborhood Playhouse for the Theater in New York City.

In 1958, he began reading poetry regularly at The Gaslight Cafe in Greenwich Village in New York City, where he eventually became the cafe's entertainment director, befriending musicians such as Bob Dylan, Tom Paxton, and Dave Van Ronk. He lived with Bob Dylan, upstairs at 116 MacDougal Street.

== Career ==
His early career was managed by Lenny Bruce who brought Romney to California in 1962 where he did a live recording of Hugh Romney, Third Stream Humor as the opening act for Thelonious Monk at Club Renaissance in Los Angeles.

=== The Hog Farm ===
The Hog Farm collective was established through a chain of events beginning with Ken Babbs hijacking the Merry Pranksters' bus, Furthur, to Mexico, which stranded the Merry Pranksters in Los Angeles. First Romney assembled a collective in North Hollywood, visited by musicians such as Ravi Shankar and Tiny Tim (whom he managed).

After moving to Sunland, a suburb in the San Fernando Valley, north of Los Angeles, Romney was evicted from his one-bedroom cabin after the landlord discovered that a large group of assorted pranksters and musicians were staying there. Two hours later, a neighbor informed Romney that a nearby hog farm needed caretakers after the farmer had suffered a stroke, and Romney accepted an offer to work at the farm in exchange for rent. Local people, musicians, artists, and members of other communes began staying at the mountain-top farm. In his book Something Good for a Change, Gravy described this early period as a "bizarre communal experiment" where the "people began to outnumber the pigs".

Throughout the mid-1960s, both Romney and his wife, Bonnie Beecher, were employed in Los Angeles. He worked for Columbia Pictures teaching improvisation skills to actors. Beecher was a successful television actress, appearing in episodes of The Twilight Zone, Gunsmoke, Star Trek, and The Fugitive.

By 1966, the Hog Farm had coalesced into an entertainment organization providing light shows at the Shrine Exposition Hall in Los Angeles for music artists such as the Grateful Dead, Cream, and Jimi Hendrix. Beginning in 1967, the collective began traveling across the country in converted school buses purchased with money earned as extras in Otto Preminger's feature film Skidoo (1968).

The Hog Farm relocated to the Black Oak Ranch in Laytonville, Mendocino County, in Northern California in the early 1990s.

=== Woodstock Festival ===
At the first Woodstock Festival, Romney and the Hog Farm collective accepted festival executive Stan Goldstein's offer to help with preparations.

Romney called his group the "Please Force," a reference to their non-intrusive tactics at keeping order, e.g., "Please don't do that, please do this instead". When asked by the press—who were the first to inform him that he and the rest of the Hog Farm were handling security—what kind of tools he intended to use to maintain order at the event, his response was "Cream pies and seltzer bottles" (both being traditional clown props). In Gravy's words: "They all wrote it down and I thought, 'the power of manipulating the media', ah ha!"

Romney made announcements from the concert stage throughout the festival. He later wrote in his memoir that "the reason that I got to do all those stage announcements was because of my relationship with Chip Monk [sic]. Chip built the stage at Woodstock."

At the Rock and Roll Hall of Fame and Museum's psychedelic tribute to the 1960s "I Want To Take You Higher", Romney's sleeping bag and tie-dyed false teeth were displayed. He and Paul Krassner appeared there on the last day of the exhibit on February 28, 1998.

Romney, as Wavy Gravy after the first Woodstock, has been the Master of Ceremonies of, and the only person to appear on the bill of all three Woodstock festivals: the original festival in 1969, the 25th anniversary Woodstock '94 festival in 1994, and the 30th anniversary Woodstock '99 festival in 1999. On the morning of the 20th Anniversary of the Woodstock Festival, he and author Ken Kesey were interviewed on Good Morning America, live from the Bethel concert site, where he discussed his experience as the MC of the event.

=== Wavy Gravy name origin ===
At the 1969 Texas International Pop Festival, two weeks after Woodstock, Romney was lying onstage, exhausted after spending hours trying to get festival-goers to put their clothes back on. He later explained, "They had these conga drummers on the stage, and I said, 'Don't dance on the wavy gravy'. Then someone announced that B.B. King was there, and he was going to play for free. I started to get up, and I felt this hand on my shoulder and it was B.B. King. And he said, 'Are you Wavy Gravy?' and I just said, 'Yes, sir,' and he said, 'Wavy Gravy, I can work around you.' And he stood me up next to his amplifier, and Johnny Winter comes from the other side, and they played all night long." Romney said he considered this a mystical event, and assumed Wavy Gravy as his legal name.

=== Phurst Church of Phun and clowning ===
After frequent arrests at demonstrations, Wavy Gravy decided that his arrest would be less likely if he dressed as a clown. Romney therefore co-founded the Phurst Church of Phun in 1960 as a secret society of comics and clowns dedicated to ending the Vietnam War through the use of political theater. Romney also performs more generally as a clown, including entertaining children, work that includes such traditional clown activities as joke-telling and magic tricks. As Wavy Gravy, he has served as an official clown of the Grateful Dead.

=== Art ===
Romney has also been recognized for his work as a collage artist, with work presented at a solo exhibition in April 1999 at the Firehouse Gallery in New York under gallery owner Eric Gibbons. He had an exhibition, entitled Wavy Gravy Retrospective (1996), at the Firehouse Gallery of Bordentown, New Jersey.

He began exploring collage in the early 1960s, and his first works were created in the period where he lived above the Gaslight in Greenwich Village; he has stated that he was inspired by a Max Ernst collage he saw at the Bitter End, when he opened for Peter, Paul and Mary. His collage work includes larger pieces done for celebrities in the San Francisco Bay Area.

=== Neo-pagan appearances ===
Romney's first appearance (as Wavy Gravy) at a Neo-Pagan community event was the WinterStar Symposium in 1998 with Paul Krassner. He appeared there again in 2000 with Phyllis Curott, where he joined Rev. Ivan Stang in a joint ritual of the Church of the SubGenius and his Church of the Cosmic Giggle.

== Ventures ==
=== Seva Foundation ===
Romney co-founded the Seva Foundation in 1978, along with spiritual leader Ram Dass and public health expert Dr. Larry Brilliant. Based in Berkeley, California, Seva Foundation is an international health organization working to build sustainable sight restoration programs in a number of the globe's most under-served communities. Romney is famous for throwing all-star benefit concerts regularly featuring members of the Grateful Dead, Bonnie Raitt, Jackson Browne, David Crosby, Graham Nash, Ani DiFranco, Ben Harper, Elvis Costello, and other musicians.

=== Camp Winnarainbow ===
Romney co-founded, with his wife, the circus and performing arts camp Camp Winnarainbow, now located in Laytonville, California near the Hog Farm. He co-ran the camp alongside Txi Whizz (also known as Barbara Hanna), his "right-hand woman".

=== "Tornado of Talent" ===
In September 1981, there was an anti-nuclear protest, which included trespassing, blockade, occupation, and civil disobedience action at Diablo Canyon Power Plant, organized by the Abalone Alliance. Approximately 640 protesters were arrested, and Romney and Jackson Browne were in attendance.

Browne was able to have an acoustic guitar and performed in the gymnasium at Cuesta College; where the male incarcerated were being held. Romney organized and acted as MC for a variety show there that he called the, "Tornado of Talent". Romney arrived at the holding facility dressed in a pair of bright green coveralls. After settling into his "bunk" (a thin mattress on the gym floor) he removed the coveralls to reveal a Santa Claus suit.

=== Nobody for President and Nobody's Business ===
"Wavy Gravy nominated Nobody for president at the "Yippie National Convention" outside the Republican National Convention in Kansas City in 1976. It was the second time the Hog Farm had nominated a candidate for the Presidency, following the nomination of the hog, Pigasus, eight years prior."

Romney ran a "Nobody for President" campaign that held a rally across from the White House on November 4, 1980, which included Yippies and a few anarchists to promote the option of "none of the above" choice on the ballot—as in, "Nobody's Perfect", "Nobody Keeps All Promises", "Nobody Should Have That Much Power", and "Who's in Washington right now working to make the world a safer place? Nobody!". After criticizing Jimmy Carter, Ronald Reagan and John B. Anderson, the committee offered the "perfect" candidate: Nobody. "Nobody makes apple pie better than Mom. And Nobody will love you when you're down and out," Romney told a crowd of 50 onlookers at the rally. The allusion had been used previously, in the 1932 short film Betty Boop for President.

Romney established the store Nobody's Business across the road from the Hog Farm. reminiscent of his "Nobody for President" campaign.

== Personal life ==
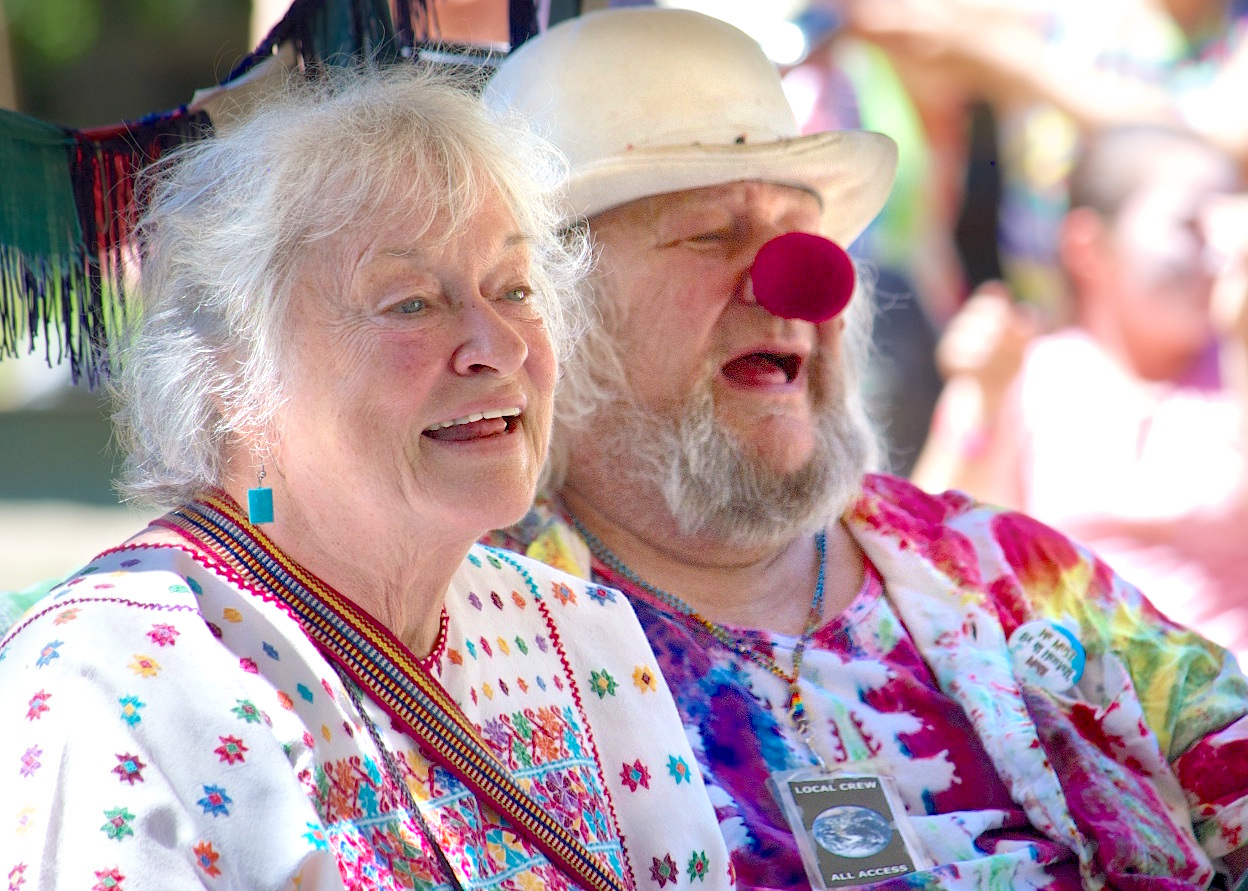
Wavy Gravy and his wife, Jahanara Romney (July 2013)

He was briefly married to a "Frenchwoman" in the early 1960s; the marriage ended in divorce.

In 1965, Romney married the actress Bonnie Jean Beecher, who later adopted the name Jahanara Romney. They have a son, born as Howdy Do-Good Gravy Tomahawk Truckstop Romney, who has since changed to a singular different first name.

== Radio programs ==
As Wavy Gravy, Romney has had two radio shows on Sirius Satellite Radio's Jam On station.

- Gravy in Your Ear: Gravy's radio show airing on the 15th of each month (including his birthday on the 15th of May) on Sirius Satellite Radio, with several re-broadcasts.
- The Wavy Files: a series of individual commentary segments by Gravy placed randomly throughout the Jam On programming on Sirius Satellite Radio.

== Filmography ==
Filmography
Year	Title	Role	Type	Notes
1963	The Fat Black Pussycat	Assistant Detective (as Hugh Romney)	Film	Detective film
1970	Woodstock	Himself	Film	Documentary film
1972	Cisco Pike	Reed (as Hugh Romney)	Film	
1994	Flashing on the Sixties: A Tribal Document	Himself	Television	
1995	The History of Rock 'N' Roll, Vol. 6	Himself	Television	
1997	Timothy Leary's Last Trip	Himself	Film	Film takes place at the "Pig-Nic" at the Hog Farm.
1999	The '60s		Film	
2000	My Generation	Himself	Film	
2001	The End of the Road	Himself	Film	
2001	Ram Dass, Fierce Grace	Himself	Film	
2005	The Holy Modal Rounders: Bound to Lose		Film	
2006	Breaking the Rules	Himself	Film	
2008	Battleground Earth	Himself	Television	Episode "Ludacris vs. Tommy Lee"
2008	Electric Apricot: Quest for Festeroo	Himself	Film	Mockumentary film.
2009	Saint Misbehavin': The Wavy Gravy Movie	Himself	Film	Documentary film, directed by Michelle Esrick and released by Ripple Effect Films.
2009	Woodstock: Now & Then	Himself	Film	
2019	Woodstock: Three Days That Defined a Generation	Himself	Film	Documentary film by director Barak Goodman.
2021	Saint Stupid The Movie recut	Himself	Film	Documentary film by Bishop Joey regarding the San Francisco St. Stupid's Day Parade

== Books ==
- Gravy, Wavy (1974). The Hog Farm and Friends. Foreword by Ken Kesey. New York City, New York: Links Books. ISBN 0-8256-3014-2.
- Gravy, Wavy (1992). Something Good for a Change: Random Notes on Peace Thru Living. New York City, New York: St Martins Press. ISBN 0-312-07838-2.

== Recordings ==
- Beat Generation Jazz Poetry, Folk Lyrics, John Brent, Len Chandler and Hugh Romney at the Gaslight, Greenwich Village (LP). New York City, New York: Musitron Records. 1960.
- Third Stream Humor (as Hugh Romney), World Pacific (1962)
- Old Feathers, New Bird: The 80s Are the 60s Twenty Years Later, Wavy Gravy, Relix (1988)
- Bear's Sonic Journals: Sing Out!, various artists, recorded April 25, 1981 at the Berkeley Community Theater, released February 23, 2024 by the Owsley Stanley Foundation

== Recognition ==
Ben & Jerry's Wavy Gravy ice cream flavor is named for Romney. Until 2001, Ben & Jerry's produced an ice cream named "Wavy Gravy" (caramel-cashew-Brazil nut base with a chocolate hazelnut fudge swirl and roasted almonds) which helped drive a scholarship fund for underprivileged kids to attend his Camp Winnarainbow.

== See also ==
- List of peace activists
