= Phurst Church of Phun =

Whimsical anti-war protest church

The Phurst Church of Phun was founded in the 1960s as a secret society of comics and clowns dedicated to ending the Vietnam War through the use of political theater. The Phurst Church of Phun has been known to perform alongside acts such as the Zen Tricksters in venues such as the Wetlands Preserve. Noteworthy members of the Phurst Church of Phun include Wavy Gravy and Johnny Dwork. Members of the Phurst Church of Phun worship by taking shelter in their "holy phool spirit guides."

There is a Phurst Church of Phun temple in Portland, Oregon, where initiations and weddings are held in a temple surrounded by rubber chickens.
