= Grace Foster Herben =

American educator and missionary (1864-1938)

Grace Ida Foster Herben (born Grace Ida Foster, 19 September 1864 – 23 July 1938) was an American educator and missionary. The daughter of a minister and the wife of another, her career became intertwined with that of Rev. Stephen J. Herben after their marriage. Beforehand she served as the dean of women at Allegheny College, and afterwards she worked with the Northwestern Branch of the Methodist Woman's Foreign Missionary Society. She was a delegate to the 1910 World Missionary Conference, and was the only woman to serve on the New Jersey Council of National Defense during World War I.

== Early life and education ==
Herben was born Grace Ida Foster on 19 September 1864, in Lanark, Illinois. Her father was Rev. John Onesimus Foster, a member of the Rock River Conference and chaplain of the Sons of the American Revolution, and her mother Caroline Amelia Foster (née Bolles). Foster received voice lessons growing up, singing to audiences on occasion, and eventually training others; in 1887, she put on a concert with 45 singers, trained by her, in order to help fund her education. She performed again the following year, at a reunion of the Christian Commission in Round Lake, New York, which she attended with her father. In 1889 she graduated from Northwestern University with a Bachelor of Letters.

== Career ==
Around August 1889, Herben was appointed dean of women at Allegheny College, beginning her duties of 17 September. Herben came recommended by Bishop John H. Vincent, also taught history at the school, and served until 1891. While working in Pennsylvania, she still spent some time in Chicago. Her 1891 marriage to Rev. Stephen J. Herben largely merged her career with his, with both devoted to the ministry, although from 1891 to 1892 she was also a graduate student at Northwestern.

Herben was involved in the Woman's Foreign Missionary Society of the Methodist Episcopal Church since at least 1903. In 1906, she started a college department of the Northwestern Branch of the organization, and served as secretary from 1906 to 1910. The program flourished and was copied by most major denominations. This engineered a further program to attract female college students to missionary work.

Herben was a delegate to the 1910 World Missionary Conference. During World War I, she was the only woman to serve on the New Jersey Council of National Defense, and was the chairman of the publicity department of the Women's Council for National Defense. She also chaired both the YWCA, and a committee related to food production, distribution, and conservation, and was a member of the Literary and Social Circle of the First Methodist church; in 1918, Mayor H. W. Evans appointed her to represent the town's Community Market at the meeting of the State Board Markets. Shortly after victory was declared in the war, Herben urged that saloons be closed and alcohol sales prohibited on the days of celebration. The following year she traveled to Houston for the annual conference of the Woman's Christian Temperance Union, delivering a speech on "Waging Peace".

== Personal life ==
Herben married Stephen J. Herben, a Northwestern classmate, on 27 May 1891. They had two children: George Foster Herben, a physician, and Stephen Joseph Herben Jr., a philologist at Bryn Mawr College. Her husband died in February 1937; a resident of Maplewood, New Jersey, she died in July of the following year, in Orange, New Jersey.

In 1906 Herben was accidentally shot by George Foster Herben while target shooting. The bullet lodged above her left knee and was not deemed serious, although her husband's initial refusal to answer questions about the matter led to sensational headlines, such as Lips are Sealed: Rev. Herben's Wife Shot Down.

== Publications ==
- Herben, Grace Foster (1911). "College Department". Annual Report of the Northwestern Branch of the Women's Foreign Missionary Society of the Methodist Episcopal Church. 41: 163.

== Bibliography ==
- Atwell, Charles B., ed. (1903). Alumni Record of the College of Liberal Arts. Evanston, Illinois: Northwestern University.
- Downs, Winfield Scott, ed. (1938). "Herben, Rev. Stephen Joseph". Encyclopedia of American Biography. New Series. New York: American Historical Society. pp. 129–131.
- Leonard, John William, ed. (1914–15). "Herben, Grace Foster (Mrs. Stephen J. Herben)". Woman's Who's who of America: A Biographical Dictionary of Contemporary Women of the United States and Canada. New York: American Commonwealth Co. pp. 382–383.
