= Camp Winnarainbow =

- Performing arts
- Location in California
- Coordinates: 39°44′56″N 123°32′02″W
- Country: United States
- State: California

Camp Winnarainbow is a circus and performing arts camp for all ages, a 501(c)(3) nonprofit organization co-founded by American entertainer and peace activist Hugh Romney (Wavy Gravy), and his wife Bonnie Beecher. Wavy, Bonnie (better known as Jahanara Romney, or Jah) and Txi Whizz jointly co-directed the camp. The camp adjoins the Hog Farm commune near Laytonville, California.

== Activities ==
Classes that campers can attend include aerials (trapeze, silks and Spanish web), juggling, improvisation, tightrope, gymnastics, acting/drama, unicycle, stilt walking, clowning and clown philosophy, art and magic. Campers are given free choice as to which classes they want to attend on a daily basis, with two mandatory periods offered in the morning and optional classes offered at free time in the afternoon.

The main camp is for children ages 7–14, with some 15-year-olds also attending, and runs for 1 week in the "A" session, 2 weeks in sessions "B" and "C", and 1 week in session "D". Camp Winnarainbow also runs a program for adults who have "forgotten how to lighten up and let loose," and two programs (teen staff and teen camp) for teenagers ages 15-17.

The camp has ties to individuals and organizations from the founder's counterculture background. Danny Rifkin, a former co-manager of the Grateful Dead, has served on the camp's board and the camp has received funding from the Furthur Foundation, the Bill Graham Foundation, Jerry Garcia, Rex Foundation and many others.

== Notable alumni ==
- Tré Cool – Green Day
- Thessaly Lerner – Ukalady
- Jory Johns – Author
- Avery Monsen – Actor / Author
- Gabriel Sunday – Actor
- Mara Hruby – Singer
- Emily Heller – Comedian
- Ryan Torf – The Story So Far
- The Amazing Bubble Man – bubble artist
- Taft Crowley – prominent political scientist
