= Hog Farm =

Intentional community

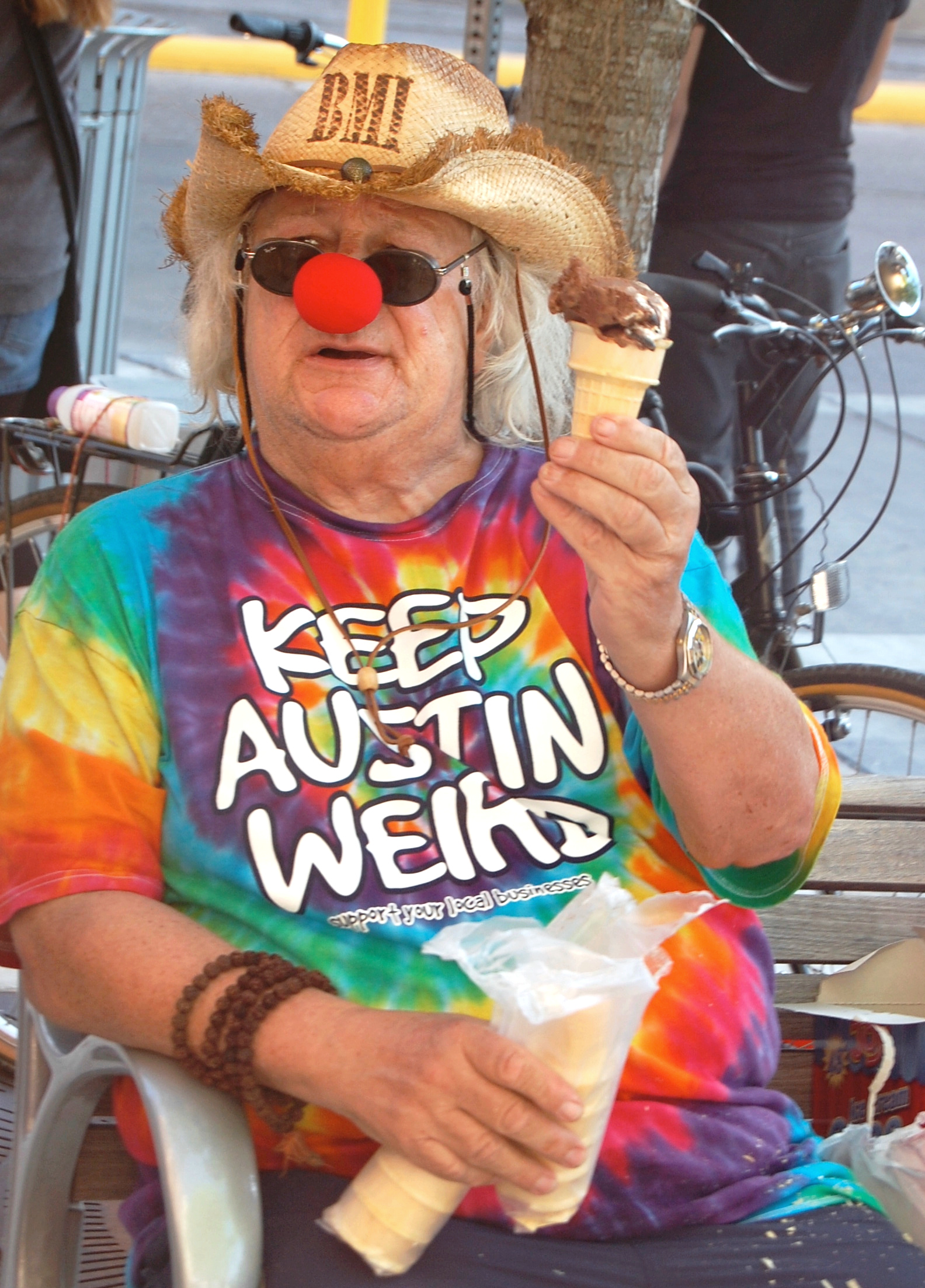
Hog Farm founder Wavy Gravy

The Hog Farm is an organization considered America's longest running hippie commune. Beginning as a collective in North Hollywood, California, during the 1960s, a later move to an actual hog farm in Tujunga, California gave the group its name. Founded by peace activist Hugh Romney (later known as the performing clown Wavy Gravy) and his actress wife Jahanara Romney (née Bonnie Jean Beecher), the Hog Farm evolved into a "mobile, hallucination-extended family", active internationally in both music and politics. A documentary short The Hog Farm Movie, filmed in 1967/68, was digitally restored in July 2019.

== Woodstock ==
The Hog Farm is perhaps best known for their involvement with the Woodstock Music Festival. While lodging on Manhattan's East Side from 1968–69, the Farm was approached by Woodstock Ventures with a proposal: participate in a planned music festival in upstate New York. Although the Farm had just bought land in Llano, New Mexico (near Truchas) and had plans to depart New York City and settle in their new home, they accepted the offer to become involved with Woodstock. Recruited to build fire pits and trails on the festival grounds at Woodstock, the Hog Farm convinced the promoter to let them set up a free kitchen as well.

"Cream Pies and Seltzer Bottles"

The Hog Farm group was flown to New York, were met by the international press at JFK Airport, and told for the first time that they had also been assigned the task of providing festival security. Gravy called his rather unorthodox security force the "Please Force", a reference to their non-intrusive tactics at keeping order ("please don't do that, please do this instead"). When asked by the press what kind of tools he intended to use to maintain order at the event, his response was "Cream pies and seltzer bottles."

== Other projects ==
Shortly after Woodstock, the Hog Farmers helped keep the peace between the cowboys and the hippies at the Texas International Pop Festival, where blues musician B. B. King gave Wavy Gravy his name.

Recruited by San Francisco underground radio pioneer Tom Donahue and Warner Brothers Records to travel from San Francisco, California to New York and be filmed for a movie called Cruising for Burgers or We Have Come for Your Daughters, later renamed Medicine Ball Caravan, the Hog Farmers bussed themselves across America, setting up stages for mainstream rock artists. Finally, in 1970 after a concert with Pink Floyd in Bishopsbourne, England, the Farmers pooled their movie salaries basically; they received $100.00 each from Warner Brothers for the work they did while traveling across the U.S. for the purpose of promoting various musical groups that they had contracted with. Some funds were raised for them as well from a benefit staged by a London commune at the Roundhouse. They continued their trek across Europe and into India, where they decided to continue to Kathmandu, Nepal, where they worked as extras in the 1971 movie Hare Rama Hare Krishna, by Bollywood director Dev Anand. After that, they were invited by the then King of Nepal to visit the palace in Pokhara several hundred miles west of Kathmandu.

Stewart Brand (Whole Earth Catalog founder and editor), contacted the Swedish Government when he heard that the United Nations would host the United Nations Conference on the Human Environment in June 1972 in Stockholm, Sweden. As America was constantly having antiwar demonstrations protesting the US involvement in Vietnam, he worried that in Stockholm that summer, perhaps violent protests might break out and thought that by sending a group of Hog Farmers over there, they might be able to be a calming center as they had done at Woodstock and other events. As it turned out, though, there weren't any protests at all. In 1974 the Swedish rock singer Pugh Rogefeldt wrote the song "Hog Farm" to criticize the community's use of drugs while visiting Stockholm; the song appears on the album Bolla och Rulla.

Passing through Amsterdam where they joined up with the crew of the Man bus just returned from India, they set out for Stockholm in a bus called the Mouse bus that had been converted from a gasoline engine to a propane engine. This was done in order to make the point at the conference that if a bunch of "ignorant hippies" could convert machines that consumed gasoline (and create unnecessary pollution), then industry could just as well or perhaps even better convert motors to a cleaner fuel. The Hog Farm were given a free campsite at Skarpnäck, a small glider airfield outside Stockholm proper together with an assortment of ecology activists. A free kitchen was established there by the Swedish Army, who brought several mobile cooking units and hundreds of pounds of oatmeal, wheat flour, rice, and other foods. The Free Food Kitchen started feeding a few hundred people a day. The Swedish Army also set up over 100 twenty-man tents, and built a stage where, at night, people gathered and discussed the happenings of the day. The highlight for the Hog Farm was the whale march into downtown Stockholm where they traveled in a bus—the Robin Hood bus—that was covered in black plastic with a big whale tail and preceded by a group of dancers representing death, to support a moratorium on whaling.

== Later years ==
Today the Hog Farm continues in various locations, including a headquarters in Berkeley, California and a 600+ acre farm in Laytonville, California, known as Black Oak Ranch, which is also home to Wavy Gravy's performing arts camp for children, Camp Winnarainbow. Black Oak plays host to several music festivals each year, most of which operate in support of charitable causes. One such event was the annual Hog Farm Family Pig-Nic, which has featured performances by artists such as Ben Harper, Spearhead, and others. In recent years the Kate Wolf Memorial Music Festival, Enchanted Forest Gathering, and Earthdance festivals have been held there.

== Sources ==
- Gravy, Wavy (1974). The hog farm and friends. New York: Links Books distributed by Quick Fox. ISBN 0825630142. OCLC 947606.
- Gravy, Wavy (1992). Something good for a change : random notes on peace thru living. New York: St. Martin's Press. ISBN 0312078382. OCLC 25367907.
