= Bonnie Beecher =

American actress (born 1941)

- Born: Bonnie Jean Boettcher; April 25, 1941 (age 85); Minneapolis, Minnesota, U.S.
- Other name: Jahanara Romney
- Occupations: Activist, singer, actress
- Spouse: Wavy Gravy
- Children: 1

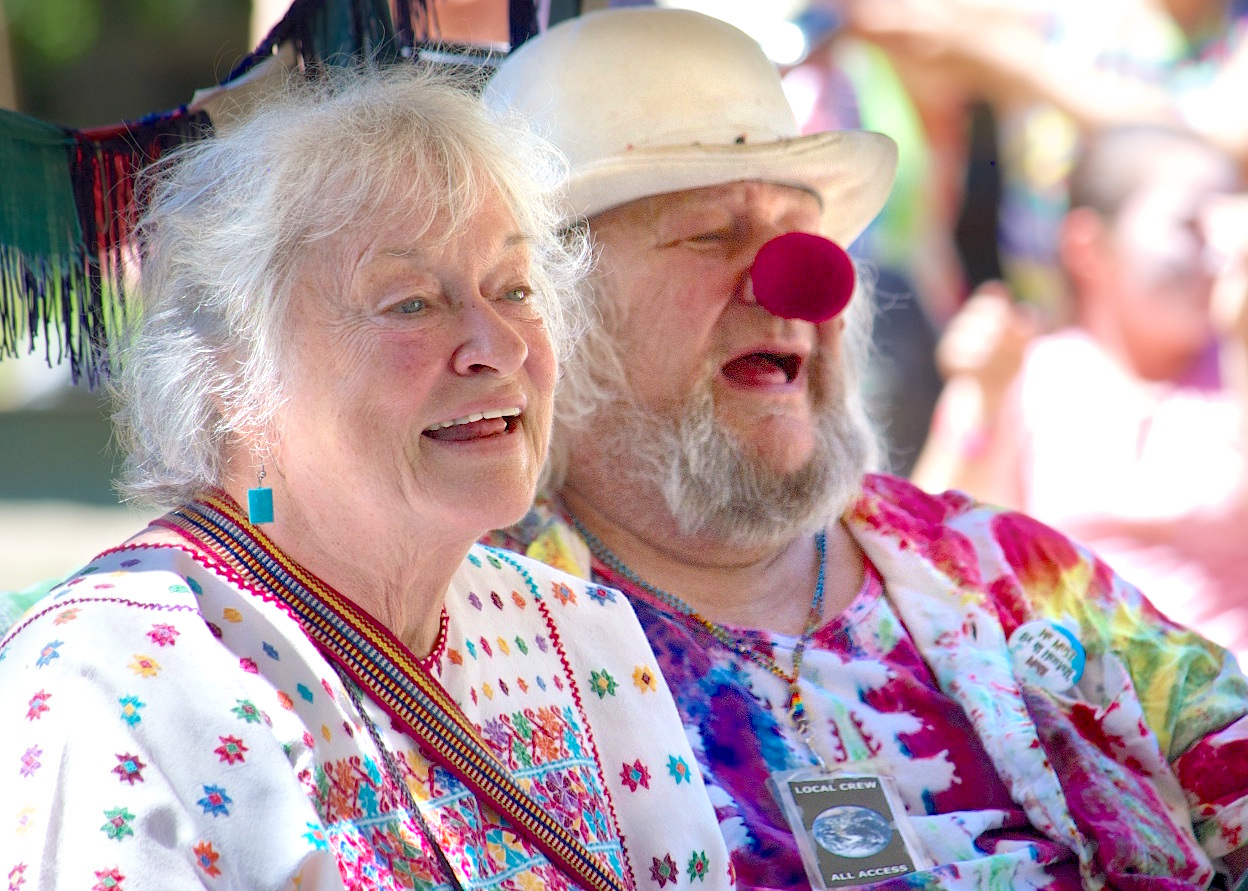
Beecher with husband Wavy Gravy in 2013

Bonnie Jean Beecher (née Boettcher), later known as Jahanara Romney, (born April 25, 1941) is an American activist and retired actress.

== About ==
Beecher was born in Minneapolis, Minnesota, to Art and Jean Boettcher.

She knew Bob Dylan during his early career, they dated briefly in college, and she may have been the inspiration for his song "Girl from the North Country". However, it may have been about his high school girlfriend Echo Helstrom or later girlfriend Suze Rotolo, or no one person in particular. Beecher's singing is heard on Dylan's 1960 bootleg recording known as the "Minneapolis Party Tape", which was recorded while they were dating. Some of Dylan's earliest recordings in 1961 were recorded at her Minneapolis home.

She made her television debut in the 1964 episode "Come Wander with Me" of The Twilight Zone. She sang the song referenced in the title, which has since appeared in works such as The Brown Bunny and Baby Reindeer. Her short television career ended in 1968, with the October episode "Spectre of the Gun" of Star Trek, and a November episode of The Outsider.

== Personal life ==
Beecher married Wavy Gravy (born Hugh Romney) on May 22, 1967. She adopted the name Jahanara Romney shortly after marriage. The couple has a son, born Howdy Do-Good Gravy Tomahawk Truckstop Romney, who has since changed his name to Jason.

She has worked as administrative director of Camp Winnarainbow since 1983. Her husband serves as director of the camp, which is located near Laytonville, Mendocino County in Northern California.

== Filmography ==
Television
Year	Title	Role	Notes
1964	The Twilight Zone	Mary Rachel	"Come Wander With Me" S5E34
1964	The Farmer's Daughter	Fan Lucas	"Like Father Like Son" S2E15
1964	Mr. Novak	Gina Czarnecki	"The People Doll: You Wind It Up and It Makes Mistakes" S2E7
1965	Mr. Novak	Valerie	"The Student Who Never Was" S2E26
1965	Burke's Law	Bunny #7	"Who Killed the Grand Piano?" S2E31
1965	Peyton Place	Janet Sinclair	S1E77–79 (uncredited); S1E80
1966	The Donna Reed Show	Julie	"Do It Yourself Donna" S8E18
1966	The Fugitive	Kate Kelly	"Ill Wind" S3E24
1966	The Fugitive	Ella Lawrence	"Ten Thousand Pieces of Silver" S4E5
1967	The Invaders	Woman / Mrs. Brandon	"Beachhead" S1E1
1967	Gunsmoke	Anne Gilchrist	"Nitro!" parts 1&2 S12E28&29
1968	Cowboy in Africa	Deirdre O'Neill	"The Red Hand of Michael O'Neill" S1E19
1968	Star Trek	Sylvia	"Spectre of the Gun" S3E6
1968	The Outsider	Gloria Gronowski	"The Twenty Thousand Dollar Carrot" S1E8
