= Sarah Andrews (author) =

American geologist and author (died 2019)

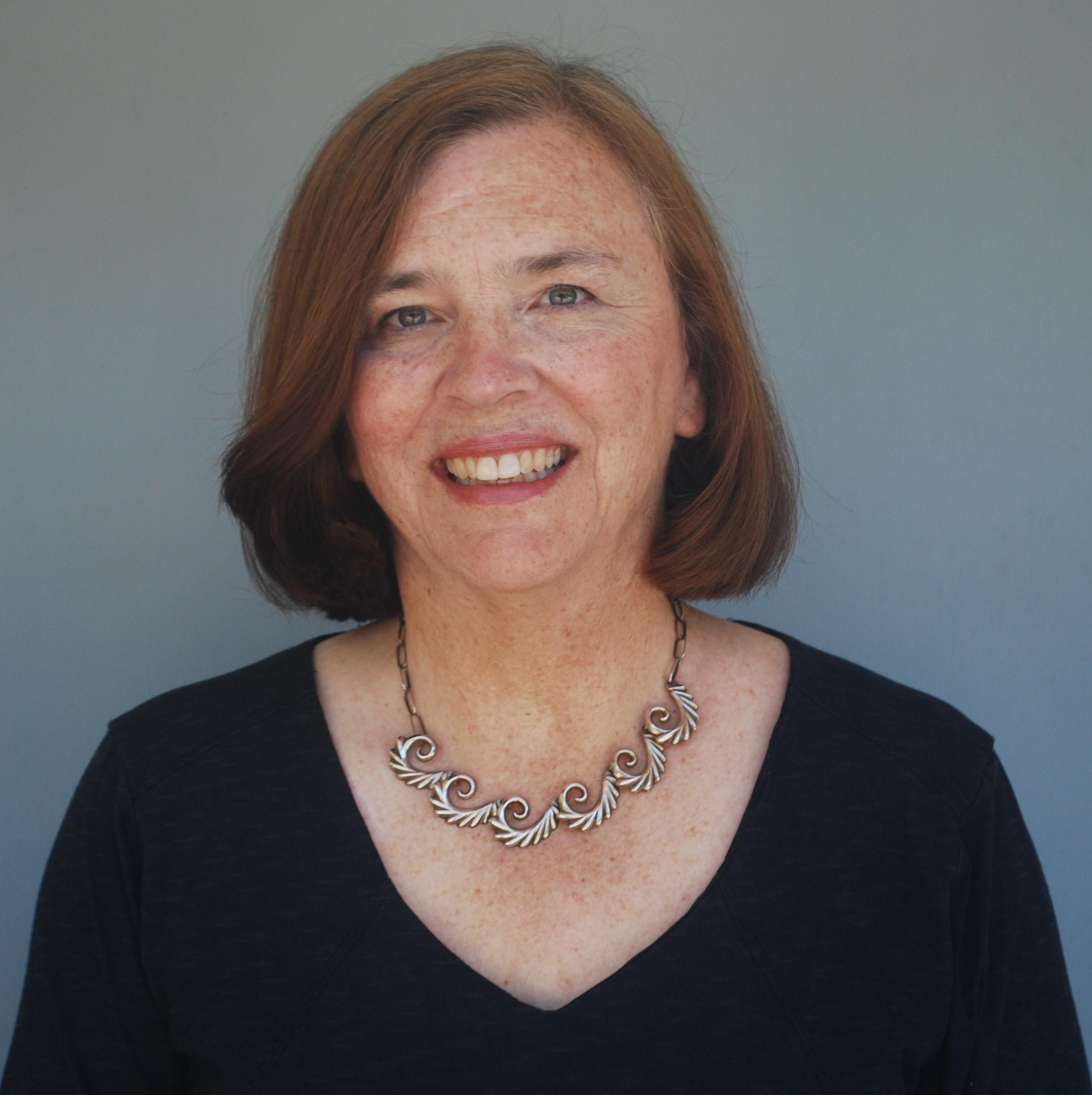
- Born: 1951
- Died: July 24, 2019 (aged 67–68)
- Education: Colorado College (B.A.), Colorado State University (m.S.)
- Occupations: Author, geologist
- Writing career
- Genre: Mystery

Sarah Andrews (1951 – July 24, 2019) was an American geologist and author of twelve science-based mystery novels and several short stories. Many of the novels feature "clear-thinking, straight-talking" forensic geologist Em Hansen and take place in the Rocky Mountains region of the United States. Her novels have been praised for their combination of science and detective work within the mystery genre. Andrews, her husband Damon, and son Duncan died in a plane crash in Nebraska on July 24, 2019.

== Life and career ==
I took in everything I had ever observed and projected myself backward in time, seeing the landscape on which the sands had been deposited before they became rock.

— Sarah Andrews, The Dyslexic Advantage, pg 147

Sarah Andrews was born in 1951. She grew up in Connecticut and in Ossining, New York. Her father was an artist and art teacher and her mother, a teacher of English and comparative religions. Since childhood, she had a passion for exploring the great outdoors, including sailing with her father and wandering solo through the woods and fields during the family's long summers in rural Maine.

Andrews left New York to attend Colorado College. In a creative writing class, she discovered that she "had a knack for storytelling." Later, inspired by her Aunt Lysbeth's profession, Andrews selected a geology course to fulfill a science requirement. She found herself among people who thought the way she did, and that she even excelled "taking in graphical information holistically, seeing the patterns, understanding their meaning, and making interpretations from them." Her aptitude inspired her to earn a BA in geology.

After college, Andrews stayed in Colorado, working first as a plumber's apprentice on a construction site south of Colorado Springs. When kidded by coworkers about where her "fancy education" had gotten her, she happily taught them about the ancient seaway that had once existed in the area, sharing the fossils she had found up while digging for drain pipes that had been buried by the backhoe.

Andrews next took a job at the U.S. Geological Survey, working under legendary Grand Canyon geologist Edwin D. McKee from 1974 to 1980. In her work, she studied modern sand dunes in order to understand ancient sand dune rock formations.

She went on to earn a MS in Earth Resources from Colorado State University, studying with Frank Ethridge, then worked as a petroleum geologist with Amoco and ANGUS Petroleum. After being laid off during the oil "bust" of 1986, she moved to California, where she worked as an environmental consultant, began to write, and lectured in the Geology Department at Sonoma State University.

== Awards and honors ==
In 2005, Andrews was awarded an Artists and Writers grant by the National Science Foundation and deployed through McMurdo Station, Antarctica to remote field camps to research an eleventh novel featuring fictional glaciologist Valena Walker. Andrews has won numerous other awards for her writings, including the Geological Society of America President's Medal and the American Association of Petroleum Geologists Journalism Award, now called the Geosciences in the Media Award. Other of her awards include:

- 2009 Louis T. Benezet Award from Colorado College
- 2008 Fellow of the Geological Society of America
- 2006 Antarctic Service Medal
- 2003 Special Award of the Association of Engineering Geologists
- 2001 James T. Shea Award of the National Association of Geoscience Teachers
- 1997 Journalism Award of the Rocky Mountain Association of Geologists

== Death ==
Andrews, along with her husband and son, died in a private plane crash in Chadron, Nebraska, on July 24, 2019, on the way home from an air show in Wisconsin. The NTSB identifies the "pilot's failure to ensure adequate fuel was on board before departing" as the cause of the crash. Andrews' life and works are memorialized by the Geological Society of America. The Sarah Andrews Brown Papers are archived in the Special Collections of Charles L. Tutt Library, Colorado College, Colorado Springs.

== Inspiration and influences ==
The more interesting crimes are the ones that involve all of the characters in the stories, including the protagonist—and where things fall through the cracks.

— Sarah Andrews, as interviewed in "Murder, they write in North Bay"

In one of her jobs as a geologist, Andrews entertained herself during dull meetings by "picking someone across the table as a murder victim and then trying to figure out who killed him." These imaginings and her colleagues' positive reception of them led to her publishing mystery novels.

The white-collar crimes in Andrews' first three novels are drawn from real events that she or colleagues observed. The murders, on the other hand, are included for the drama.

Geologist Gene Shinn "worked for years on Andrews" to incorporate into one of her novels his theory of dust floating from somewhere in Africa across the Atlantic Ocean to the United States. On September 11, 2001, she called his office, and the conversation inspired her book Killer Dust.

Andrews cites Dorothy Sayers, Tony Hillerman, and Agatha Christie as favorite mystery writers.

== Thinking about geology ==
Although no two observations are precisely identical, we find that we can nonetheless categorize them, over time and through the accumulation of experience, into themes and variations.

— Sarah Andrews, "Spatial Thinking with a Difference", page 3

Beyond her careers as a geologist and a novelist, Andrews has reflected on geology itself from a number of angles. Her whitepaper "Spatial Thinking with a Difference: An Unorthodox Treatise on the Mind of the Geologist" describes how she uses episodic simulation to understand past and future geologic events. She has considered how geologists act as detectives and how her experience as a woman impacted her approach to geology. And in a short note on geophilosophy, she points out that it is "important to know that science involves not just the collection of facts, but also a variety of logics and reasonings, some of which vary from one division of science to another."

== Bibliography ==
=== Em Hansen Mysteries ===
- Tensleep - 1994
- A Fall in Denver - 1995
- Mother Nature - 1997
- Only Flesh and Bones - 1998
- Bone Hunter - 1999
- An Eye For Gold - 2000
- Fault Line - 2002
- Killer Dust - 2003
- Earth Colors - 2004
- Dead Dry - 2005
- Rock Bottom - 2012

=== Other novels ===
- In Cold Pursuit - 2007

== Bibliography ==
- Chan, Marjorie A. & Price, Jonathan G. (January 2020). "Memorial to Sarah Andrews Brown: 1951–2019" (PDF). Memorials. 49. The Geological Society of America: 5–8.
