= John Onesimus Foster =

American Methodist minister (1833–1920)

John Onesimus Foster (December 14, 1833 – November 3, 1920) was an American Methodist minister. He was a member of the Rock River Conference, a chaplain for the Sons of the American Revolution, and a faculty member at the University of Puget Sound.

== Early life and education ==
John Onesimus Foster was born on December 14, 1833, in La Porte, Indiana. In 1840 his family moved to Iowa, then a settlement, where he grew up. From 1854 to 1860 he attended Cornell College in Mount Vernon, Iowa, and in 1862 he graduated from the Garrett Biblical Institute in Evanston, Illinois. In 1874 he graduated from the first normal class of the Chautauqua Institution. All told he received diplomas for normal and literary work, along with a Master of Arts, a Bachelor of Divinity, and a Doctor of Divinity.

== Career ==
In 1904, Foster moved to Seattle, and joined the Washington State Society of the Sons of the American Revolution that January. He was eligible through his maternal grandfather, Henry Batten, who served in the Pennsylvania Troops near Pittsburgh as an orderly sergeant, and received a pension.

He eventually became the State Chaplain for Washington, and served also as the president of the Seattle chapter. In 1905, he began teaching theology at the University of Puget Sound in Tacoma, Washington. Still teaching in his 80s, he was thought to be the oldest college teacher in the country.

Foster, who was considered "an inventor of many ingenious devices and processes", also worked as an editor and wrote several books, including The Heart of the Bible.

== Personal life ==
In 1863 Foster married Caroline Amelia Bolles, with whom he fathered Grace Ida Foster. Grace Foster became a missionary, and married the minister Stephen J. Herben, also a Garrett Institute alumnus. Foster died on November 3, 1920, in Seattle, at the age of 86. At the time he was believed to be the oldest professor still actively teaching in the United States. His ashes were buried in Rosehill Cemetery in Chicago.

== Publications ==
- Foster, John Onesimus (1872). Life and Labors of Mrs. Maggie Newton Van Cott, the First Lady Licensed to Preach in the Methodist Episcopal Church in the United States. Cincinnati: Hitchcock and Walden.

== Bibliography ==
- Clark, A. Howard, ed. (1916). "Biographies of General Officers". National Year Book. National Society of the Sons of the American Revolution. pp. 5–10.
- Downs, Winfield Scott, ed. (1938). "Herben, Rev. Stephen Joseph". Encyclopedia of American Biography. New Series. New York: American Historical Society. pp. 129–131.
- Leonard, John William, ed. (1914–15). "Herben, Grace Foster (Mrs. Stephen J. Herben)". Woman's Who's who of America: A Biographical Dictionary of Contemporary Women of the United States and Canada. New York: American Commonwealth Co. pp. 382–383.
