= Jack Foster hoax =

Fictitious Australian rules footballer

Jack Foster
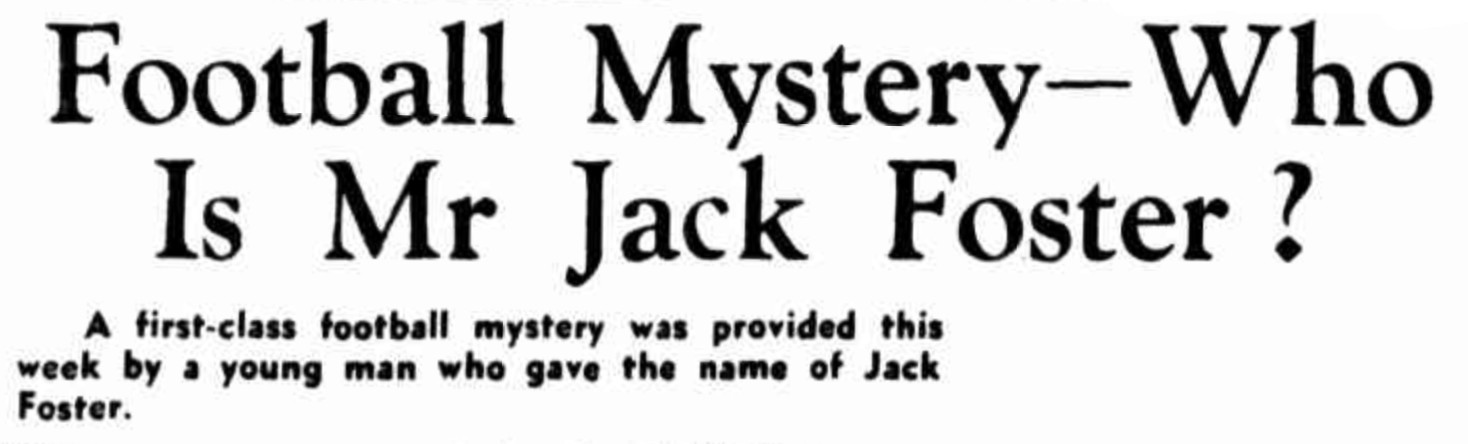
- Headline from the Sporting Globe in 1938

Personal information
- Born: November 1914 (claimed)
- Position: Full-forward (claimed)

Playing career
Years	Club	Games (Goals)
1936	Sturt (claimed)	

Jack Foster was an Australian rules football hoax that affected the Preston Football Club in the Victorian Football Association (VFA) in 1938.

== Overview ==
On 17 May 1938, Preston Football Club vice-president Alan McCasker received a telegram from a person in Ballarat, who only signed their name as "Roberts", stating that a "crack full-forward" known as Jack Foster would be arriving from Adelaide at Spencer Street railway station, seeking employment. McCasker travelled to the station with Preston secretary Harry Bredin and senior team selector George Timms.

When the three men arrived at Spencer Street, representatives from two or three other Victorian Football Association (VFA) clubs, along with recruiters from multiple Victorian Football League (VFL) clubs, were already standing on the platform. It is unknown whether the telegram had provided Preston with further information that the other club representatives were aware of, but they were able to find Foster and get him to sign an application to play for Preston.

Two days later, The Age wrote about Preston's recruiting "coup", describing Foster as a "strict amateur and crack goalkicker", although he had not played football during the previous season. According to The Age, he had sent clearance papers to his former club – Sturt in the South Australian National Football League (SANFL) – in order to play for Preston.

The hoax began to be uncovered on the morning of 20 May, when a man identifying himself as Foster visited the offices of the Sporting Globe. He told a journalist that he was not interested in playing for either VFA or VFL clubs, having instead come to Melbourne to learn the throw-pass rule that the VFA had introduced for the 1938 season. Foster said he was born in November 1914 (making him 23 years old in May 1938) and first played football in 1936, when he supposedly kicked 114 goals to finish second in the SANFL goalkicking count. However, when contacted by the Sporting Globe, a Sturt representative said "no man named Foster has played with us during the past six years".

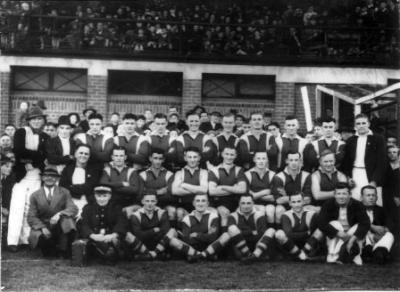
The real Preston team in 1938

On 21 May, the Sporting Globe journalist went to Preston Park in an attempt to confront Foster with the discrepancies, but the footballer was not there. Later on the same day, Timms received a telegram from "Roberts" (this time originating from Ararat) which wrote that Foster was "disgusted" with treatment from other clubs and advised contact through the post office in Horsham". It was also revealed by Preston officials that when they tried to contact Foster at the hotel he had told them he was staying at, they were told that there was no person named "Foster" registered, nor had the hotel taken bookings that coincided with the arrival of the train from Adelaide.

After contacting the Horsham post office, Timms was advised that "Roberts" was unknown to them and no arrangements had been made for the collection of the telegram. It was also discovered by the Sporting Globe that the address in Adelaide supplied by Foster on his application to play with Preston did not exist. The secretary of the Port Melbourne Football Club said he was also contacted about the possibility of signing Foster, but stated that "I did not want the player, so I did not chase him". Officials from the Yarraville Football Club also said they signed Foster for the VFA season, reporting that Foster had claimed he played for the West Torrens Football Club in the SANFL as a half-forward and worked as a plasterer.

On 22 May, The Age was contacted by Jack Forster (spelt with an "R"), who had played with West Adelaide in 1936 and travelled to Melbourne to train with South Melbourne in the VFL, saying he "want[ed] it known that I am not the player who communicated with Preston" and "I do not know anyone by the name of Roberts".

Three weeks later, a man identifying himself as Jack Foster wrote to The Age from Horsham. Foster said officials from both Preston and Camberwell had approached him at Spencer Street and he had gone to Preston Park, but he never formally signed with the club, while he was "600 miles from Melbourne" when it had been reported he was visiting Yarraville. He also claimed he played for Sturt twice against West Adelaide during the 1937 SANFL season, countering his previous claim that he last played football in 1936. Despite this letter, Preston maintained the incident was a hoax and stated in 2008 that Foster "perhaps never really even existed".
