= John B. Foster (artist) =

American painter

John B. Foster (1865–1930) was a New England artist, born in Gloucester, Massachusetts, on December 25, 1865. He was the son of John Benjamin Foster, a boat captain who emigrated from England, and Sarah E. Merchant, daughter of a Cape Ann fishing family.

Foster worked primarily in water colors depicting seascape and harbor scenes from the Gloucester area. He also had a sign painting business and used to paint scenes on the glass of steeple clocks and other types of clocks for Boston Jewelers. Occasionally a work in oil becomes available at auction but his principal medium was watercolor.

Examples of Foster's work can be seen in the Blackwood/March auction site and the Rockport Art Association website.
