= Alvan Barach =

American physician

Alvan Leroy Barach (1895–1977) was an American physician who made important contributions to pulmonary rehabilitation and oxygen therapy. He converted the oxygen tent into a closed system and he was among the early proponents of exercise and supplemental oxygen administration for patients with lung problems.

== Biography ==
Barach was born in New Castle, Pennsylvania. He graduated from City College of New York and Columbia University College of Physicians and Surgeons, then moved to Harvard Medical School, studying respiratory physiology.

After his postgraduate training, Barach was on the faculty of the College of Physicians and Surgeons and he was widely published, particularly on topics involving oxygen. In 1934, he published a study indicating that noble gases were not essential to sustain life. Barach wrote that he had been able to keep laboratory mice alive in an environment composed purely of 21% oxygen and 79% nitrogen; noble gases had been carefully excluded. The findings conflicted with those of J. Willard Hershey, who said that in his experiments, laboratory rats had died under those conditions.

The oxygen tent had been introduced in the 1920s, and Barach turned the device into a closed system by adding ice chunks for cooling and soda lime for the absorption of the patient's exhaled carbon dioxide. He also introduced portable oxygen systems for emphysema patients and authored the first modern report of supplemental oxygen use for patients hospitalized with pneumonia. In 1950, Barach was one of three contributors to the first set of minimum standards for training programs in inhalation therapy (later known as respiratory therapy).

Late in his career, Barach suggested that smoking was not dangerous if the smoker did not inhale. In a 1964 meeting before the New York State Medical Society, he urged the creation of clinics that could teach smokers a technique for enjoying cigarettes without inhaling the smoke. That same year, physician Walter C. Alvarez described several of Barach's interventions for emphysema patients. Barach recommended progressively increasing periods of exercise while using a nasal cannula. He also advocated the placement of particular amounts of buckshot on a patient's abdomen to strengthen the breathing, and he recommended an "emphysema belt" that pushed on the abdomen to facilitate breathing.

Though Barach was a full-time pulmonary specialist, he practiced psychoanalysis in his spare time and claimed to have analyzed a number of notable individuals, including Dorothy Parker and Cissy Patterson.

Barach died at a New York hospital on December 13, 1977.
