= Jonathan Foster (musician) =

American singer-songwriter

Jonathan Foster (born 1/1/1979) is a singer-songwriter from Cranberry Lake, New York, Foster resided in Redding, California for 20 years. He has released six studio albums, two live albums, several singles, and has toured the United States since 2013. His studio albums were recorded and produced by Bruce Turgon in Redding, California. His 2021 album Lantern Shade received favorable reviews and was recognized in The Repository's Best Music of 2021 as a "gem of a record". He has also been reviewed in Americana Highways, which compared Foster to a mix of Blaze Foley, John Denver, and Gordon Lightfoot along with other writers comparing his music and style to Bob Dylan and Willie Nelson.

Foster is a self taught acoustic guitar and harmonica player whose music has been referenced as blending the folk and Americana genres. His projects have regularly featured guitarist Ron Gillette, multi-instrumentalist Morgan Hannaford (Mo Ford), drummer Joe Misztal, and bassist Bruce Turgon. He is the founder of Miracle Mile Records, which was an independent record label based in Redding, California from 2015 to 2020. During this period he assisted other artists in the release of albums, including a compilation of original children’s themed songs titled Cats, Dogs, and Pollywogs in 2016. Miracle Mile Records helped feature live performances, including at the Whole Earth and Watershed Festival and the Redding Roots Revival Music Festival, where Foster continues to be a featured performer. Jonathan attended SUNY ESF in Syracuse, New York and has also worked as a conservation biologist. He currently hosts the Downtown Artist Cellar's monthly songwriter's series.

== Discography ==
- Roadside Attraction (2023) features traditional song "The Cuckoo"
- Live at the Raven Café (2023) features traditional song "Make Me a Pallet On Your Floor"
- Lantern Shade (2021) features traditional song "Shady Grove"
- Wildlife (2019 Miracle Mile Records) featuring Scott Joss on fiddle on a cover of "Girl from the North Country"
- 40 (2019 Miracle Mile Records, vinyl record EP)
- Green Eyed Bird (2017 Miracle Mile Records) featuring award winning song "Reclamation Town"
- American Highway Live (2016 Miracle Mile Records)
- Help Me Run (2015 Miracle Mile Records)
- Sabbatical (2013) features two Sam Bragdon covers: "Box of Ribbons" and "Too Much Love (Much Too Late)"

Singles

- Houndsville (2026)
- Sloop John B (2025)
- Still Here (2025)
- Never Cry Wolf (2025)
- Snow Globe Angles (2024)
- Washed Ashore (2024)
- Star Lake (2024)
- Jaguar Butterfly (2024)
- When You Leave (2023)
- Selfish (2023)
- The Cuckoo (2022)
- The Mountain Echo (2022)
