= Stephen J. Herben =

Methodist clergyman (1861–1937)

Rev. Stephen Joseph Herben (11 May 1861 – 22 February 1937) was an editor and clergyman in the Methodist Episcopal Church. Born in London but raised in America, by 1906 he was considered "one of the best known men in the Methodist Church". In 1931 he conducted the service at the burial of Thomas Edison, a close friend.

== Early life and education ==
Herben was born in London, England, and moved to the United States as a child, where he attended public schools in Jersey City. Following a move west, he attended Evanston Academy in Illinois, and then in 1889 obtained a Bachelor of Arts from Northwestern University. That year he was ordained to the Methodist Episcopal Church ministry; he continued studies at the Garrett Biblical Institute, and received a Bachelor of Divinity in 1891. Later, he would also receive two honorary degrees: a Doctor of Letters from Syracuse University in 1897, and a Doctor of Divinity from the Garrett Institute in 1904.

== Career ==
Herben served as the associate editor of The Epworth Herald from 1890 to 1895, and the assistant editor of The New York Christian Advocate from then to 1904; the same year he was elected editor of the Herald, serving for the next eight years. From 1902 to 1904 he also served as the minister of Morrow Memorial Methodist Episcopal Church in Maplewood, New Jersey, and in 1912 he left editorship to take up the pastorate of the Methodist Episcopal Church in Orange, New Jersey. From January 1916 to 1919, he served at the Methodist Episcopal Church in Westfield, New Jersey, excepting a break during which he was commissioned as a captain in the United States military and ministered to those in France. After his 1919 return to the United States, he became the director of the literature department of the Interchurch World Movement, serving through 1920. In 1921 he was then appointed to oversee book publicity for the Methodist Book Concern in New York, a position he held until his 1933 retirement.

By 1906 newspapers considered Herben "one of the best known men in the Methodist Church". He was a close friend of Thomas Edison, and in 1931 conducted the service at his burial.

== Personal life ==
On 27 May 1891 Herben married Grace Ida Foster, a classmate at Northwestern, in Park Ridge, Illinois. They had two children, George Foster Herben, a physician, and Stephen J. Herben Jr., a philologist who taught at Bryn Mawr College. In later life Stephen Herben returned to Maplewood, where he died of heart disease on 22 February 1937.

== Bibliography ==
- Downs, Winfield Scott, ed. (1938). "Herben, Rev. Stephen Joseph". Encyclopedia of American Biography. New Series. New York: American Historical Society. pp. 129–131.
