= Jack Foster (cricketer) =

English cricketer and army officer

Personal information
- Full name: Jack Heygate Nedham Foster
- Born: 8 September 1905; Rochester, Kent
- Died: 16 November 1976 (aged 71); Edenbridge, Kent
- Batting: Right-handed

Domestic team information
- Years: Team
- 1930: Kent

Career statistics
Competition	First-class
Matches	2
Runs scored	1
Batting average	0.50
100s/50s	0/0
Top score	1
Catches/stumpings	0/–
- Source: CricInfo, 2 February 2012

Jack Heygate Nedham Foster (8 September 1905 – 16 November 1976) was an English army officer and cricketer. He was born at Rochester in Kent and educated at Harrow School.

Foster played in the Harrow cricket XI in 1923 and made ten appearances for Kent County Cricket Club's Second XI in 1924–1925, scoring a century against Norfolk. He attended the Royal Military College, Sandhurst, playing cricket against Royal Military Academy, Woolwich in July 1925, before being commissioned as a 2nd Lieutenant in the Buffs in February 1926.

Foster made two trial appearances for Kent in the 1930 County Championship. His first-class cricket debut came against Middlesex at Folkestone on 9 July and he played again in the county's following fixture against Surrey at Blackheath. The trial was not a success and these were Foster's only first-class appearances. He played twice for the Army team in 1934 against the Public Schools. His Wisden obituary describes him as a "good stylist" who was "quick on his feet, with a beautiful pair of wrists" when playing at school.

After retiring from the army with the rank of captain, Foster died at Edenbridge, Kent, in November 1976, aged 71.

== Bibliography ==
- Carlaw, Derek (2020). Kent County Cricketers, A to Z: Part Two (1919–1939) (PDF). Cardiff: ACS.
