= Harold H. Bender =

American philologist (1882–1951)

Harold Herman Bender (April 20, 1882 – August 16, 1951) was an American philologist who taught for more than forty years at Princeton University, where he served as chair of the Department of Oriental Languages and Literature. He was the chief etymologist for Webster's New International Dictionary, Second Edition.

== Biography ==
Bender was born in Martinsburg, West Virginia, in 1882 to I. Lewis and Margaret Eleanore (Kline) Bender. He attended Lafayette College, where he graduated in 1903, and received a Ph.D. from Johns Hopkins University in 1907. He continued his studies at the University of Berlin (1907–1908).

Bender then joined the faculty of Princeton University, where he would remain for the rest of his career. In the Modern Languages department, he served as instructor (1908–1912) and assistant professor and preceptor (1912–1918). He was named professor of Indo-Germanic Philology in 1918 and became the chair of the Department of Oriental Languages and Literatures in 1927.

He specialized in Lithuanian philology, demonstrating the relationship between Lithuanian and other Indo-European languages. He was awarded an honorary doctorate in philology from the University of Lithuania and was decorated by the country for his assistance in the Lithuanian Wars of Independence.

At Princeton he taught German, Gothic, Old Norse, Sanskrit, Lithuanian, and linguistic science. Among his students was Moe Berg, who would go on to be a Major League Baseball catcher and coach before serving as a spy for the Office of Strategic Services in World War II.

His books include German Short Stories (1920), A Lithuanian Etymological Index (1921), and The Home of the Indo-Europeans (1922). He was president of the American Oriental Society from 1923 to 1926 and a founding member of the Linguistic Society of America in 1924.

For the second edition of Webster's New International Dictionary (first published in 1934), Bender served as chief etymologist, overseeing a staff of seventy scholars who revised the etymologies of more than half a million words.

He took an interest in criminology and lent his expertise to the New Jersey State Police in the investigation of the Lindbergh kidnapping and other criminal cases.

Bender retired from Princeton in 1950 and died the following year at the age of 69.
