= Jack Forster =

English rugby union player

- Born: Jack Forster; 19 March 1987 (age 39) Wigan, England
- Height: 1.85 m (6 ft 1 in)
- Weight: 120 kg (18 st 13 lb)
- School: Bolton School; Hartpury College

Rugby union career
- Position: Prop
- Current team: Sale Sharks
Youth career
- 1996 - 98: Aspull
- 1998 - 03: Sedgley Park
Senior career
Years	Team	Apps	(Points)
2003 - 05	Sale Sharks		
2005 - 09	Gloucester Rugby	27	(5)
2007 - 09	→ Moseley (D-R)	18	(0)
2009 -	Sale Sharks	14	(14)
International career
Years	Team	Apps	(Points)
2007 -	England Saxons		

Jack Forster (born 19 March 1987 in Wigan, England) is a rugby union player for Sale Sharks in the Aviva Premiership. He usually plays at prop.

Forster played rugby for both Bolton School and Aspull Rugby Club. He moved onto playing for Sedgley Park Rugby Club before being contracted by Sale Sharks. While at Bolton School he was named as School Captain and Captain of the Rugby team.

Forster scored a try on his first appearance for both Gloucester Rugby and England Saxons, the latter coming against the USA at the 2007 Churchill Cup.

For the 2007/08 and 2008/09 seasons Forster, like the other England Academy players at Gloucester Rugby, was dual-registered with Moseley and played for both clubs during this time.

Once again in 2008, Forster was selected in the England Saxons squad, to compete at the 2008 Churchill Cup.

In March 2009, Forster was re-signed for Sale Sharks on a two-year deal.
