= The Tale of the Dog =

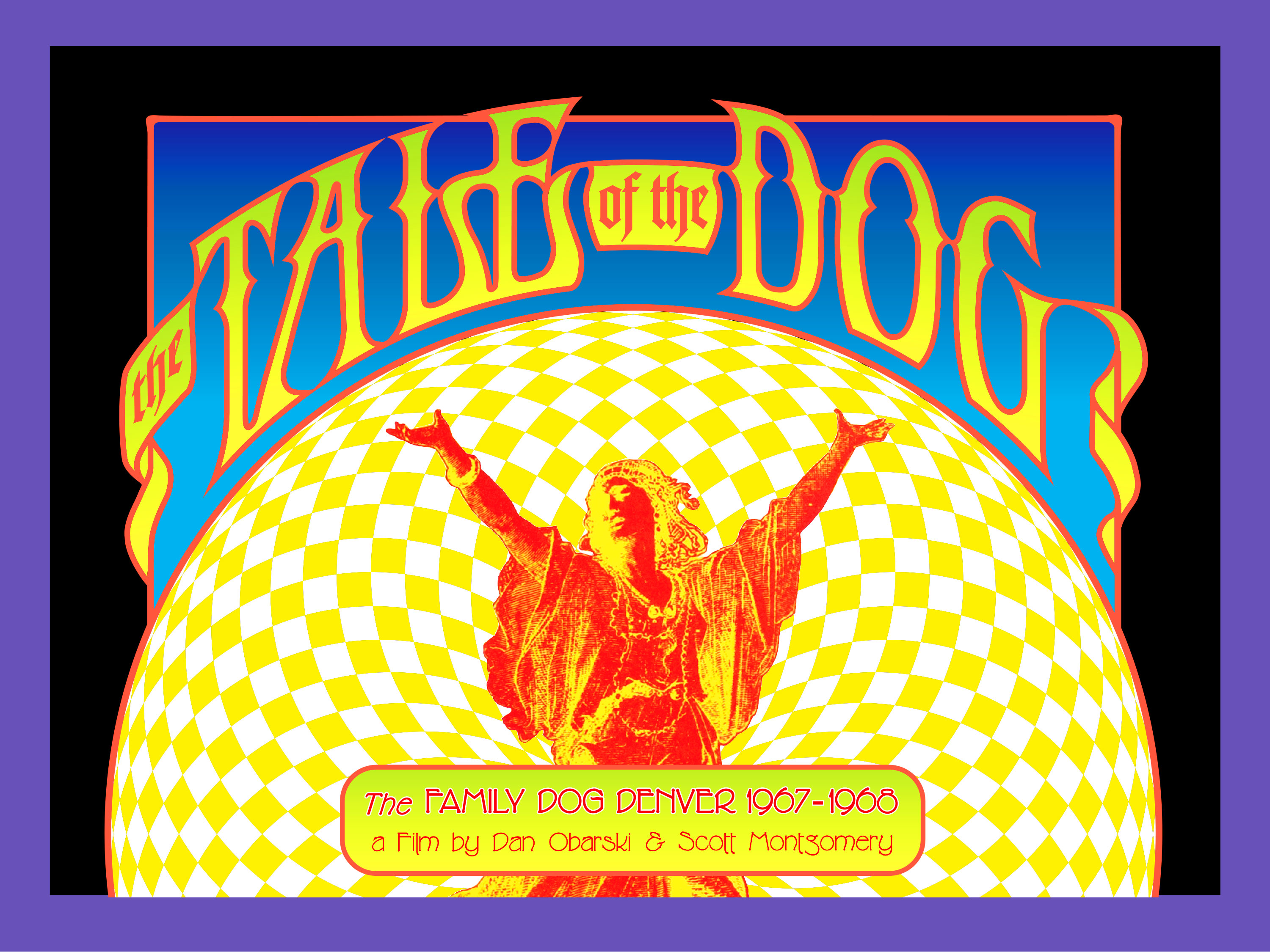
- Official Film Poster, by Raphael (Bob) Schnepf
- Directed by: Dan Obarski, Scott Montgomery
- Produced by: Dan Obarski, Scott Montgomery
- Starring: Canned Heat, Stanley Mouse, Victor Moscoso, Roger McNamee, Corky Siegal, Otis Taylor, Paul Conly, Kenny Passarelli
- Narrated by: Rick Lewis
- Distributed by: Cinedigm
- Release dates: February 2020 (Denver premiere); June 8, 2021
- Running time: 100 minutes

The Tale of the Dog is a documentary film produced and directed by Dan Obarski and Scott Montgomery. The film unearths the story of the Family Dog Denver, a music venue opened in 1967 by Chet Helms' San Francisco-based Family Dog Productions and Barry Fey. The Family Dog was pivotal in changing the cultural course of the city of Denver by bringing in up-and-coming acts like The Doors, the Grateful Dead, Janis Joplin, Jimi Hendrix, The Byrds, and many others, subsequently creating a nexus for the hippie movement to flourish in the otherwise western and conservative town. Prior to the documentary this historic episode had been lost to time. The film ends up delivering a broader, previously unknown chapter in the history of the 1960s in America, and in particular that of rock and roll, the blues, psychedelic poster art, and the infamous culture clashes between hippies and mainstream society of that decade. As a result, the film serves as a definitive reference for the significance that the venue and many of the individuals involved in it had on the city and on the rock and roll era.

The film stars Canned Heat, Stanley Mouse, Victor Moscoso, Raphael (Bob) Schnepf, Roger McNamee, and features Family Dog Denver employees, bands that played there, the people who hung out there, and the Denver police who tried to shut it down.

The film premiered at the University of Denver in February 2020, and was distributed by Cinedigm on major streaming platforms in 2021. Reception to the film has been overwhelmingly positive.

== Plot ==
The Tale of the Dog tells the previously unknown story of The Family Dog Denver through first-person interviews of those who were at "The Dog" during the dramatic ten months it was opened, from September 1967 to July 1968.

Narrated by Rick Lewis, a long time classic rock radio DJ at KRFX in Denver, the film is rich in history and contains numerous storylines. It begins by framing the cultural zeitgeist of the city in the mid-20th century, sets the stage for the drama that would follow the opening of The Dog, and unfurls the explosive events that occurred in the ensuing months, leading to numerous municipal and federal court cases. Along the way the film introduces the legendary psychedelic poster artists and the posters they did for the shows, the pioneering liquid light show that was to be the precursor to the modern concert light show, and Lothar and the Hand People, who had an outsized impact on the rock and roll era. It also details the rise of Barry Fey, who would go on to become one of the most influential concert promotors in the world. The film also presents the Denver police officers who, with the backing of the city leaders and community, were in constant conflict with the Family Dog. Central to the film's dramatic arch is the bust of Canned Heat prior to a show at The Dog, and the resulting impact it had on their career.

== Cast ==
- Canned Heat
- Stanley Mouse
- Victor Moscoso
- Marc Arno Richardson
- G. Brown
- Paul Conly
- Fito de la parra
- Melody Duggan
- Paul Epstein
- Barry Fey
- Dan Fong
- John Gray
- James Grayer
- Tony Guillory
- Scot Haseman
- Jerry Kennedy
- Rick Lewis
- Roger McNamee
- Scott Montgomery
- Dan Obarski
- Mary Oswald
- Bob Pannetta
- Kenny Passarelli
- Robert Pitler
- Mike Reinhardt
- Raphael "Bob" Schnepf
- Corky Siegel
- Cynthia Slade
- Larry Taylor
- Otis Taylor
- Skip Taylor
- James Denny Townsend
- Marilyn Wanamaker
- Roy Wanamaker
- Brent Warren

== Reception ==
The film won fourteen awards across numerous film festivals in 2020, including Best US Documentary, Best Music Feature, and Best Feature Documentary – Silver/
