= Music of Denver =

Overview of music traditions in Denver, Colorado, United States

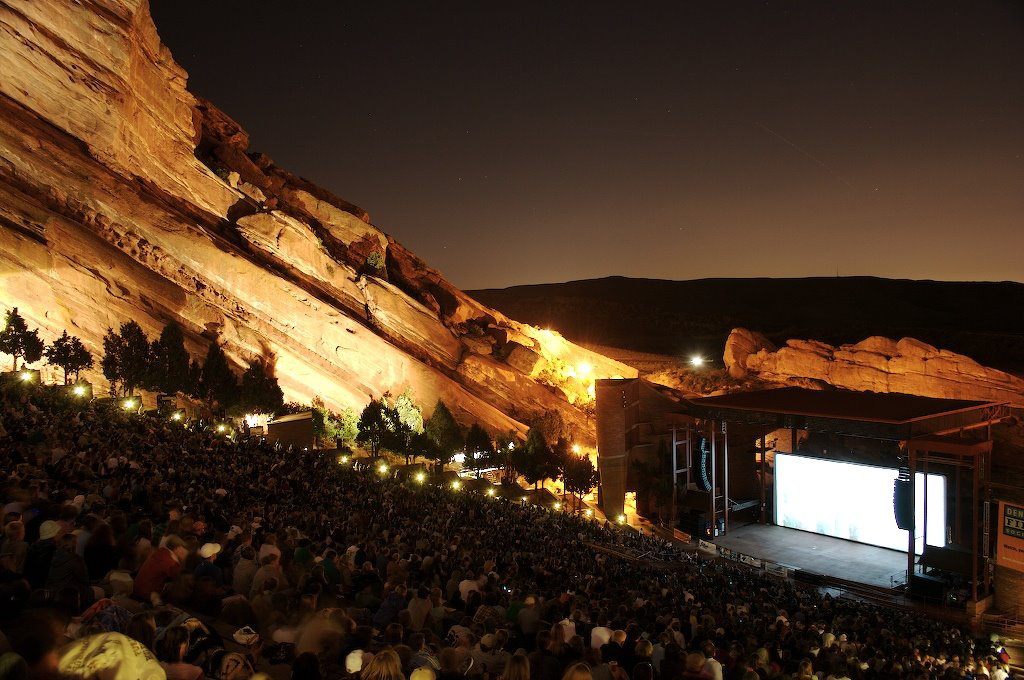
Red Rocks, Denver's most famous music venue

While Denver may not be as recognized for historical musical prominence like such cities as Los Angeles, Detroit, Chicago or New York City, it still manages to have an active popular, jazz, and classical music scene, which has nurtured many artists and genres to regional, national, and even international attention. Though nearby Boulder, Colorado has its own very distinct music scene, they are intertwined and often artists based there also play in Denver.

== History ==
=== Jazz ===
The "King of Jazz", bandleader Paul Whiteman, was born in Denver, Colorado on March 28, 1890.

From the 1920s-50s, Welton Street in Five Points was home to over fifty bars and clubs, where some of the greatest jazz musicians such as Billie Holiday, Duke Ellington, Miles Davis, Nat King Cole, Count Basie, Dizzy Gillespie, and others performed.

=== R&B/Soul ===
Denver R&B and Soul music roots stretch back many decades to musicians such as Lina, Noelle Scaggs, and Earth, Wind & Fire, with three members having roots in the city, Philip Bailey, Larry Dunn, and Andrew Woolfolk. Another known musician and 4x Grammy Award recipient with a connection to Denver is India Arie.

=== Hip-hop/rap ===
The Denver Hip-Hop and Rap scene, took a drastic change in growth in the early to mid 2000s, and has continued to grow since; with musicians such as Tag Team (group), Jomeezius, Trev Rich, Young Doe, Flobots, Air Dubai, 50/50innertainment, Stryker & MFT, 3OH!3 and The Procussions.

=== Folk music ===
As folk music gained popularity in the 1960s, a number of Denver's old folk clubs began to fill with then-unknown stars such as Judy Collins. Along with a population boom, the city gained much press for its rising music scene.

In the wake of the folk boom of the sixties came a country music boom in the early seventies, with such country-folk superstars like John Denver making names for themselves with songs inspired by the region. Denver himself was most famous for this. Today the folk music scene has blended with other genres creating a Colorado Sound that incorporates violin with rock and folk. Bands like Nordic Daughter and LaRissa Vienna & the Strange build folk into their rock sets.

=== Rock & roll and the blues ===
Denver's seminal music venue was the Family Dog Denver, a concert dance hall located at 1601 West Evans Avenue, in Denver, from 1967 to 1968. It was opened by Barry Fey, who went on to become one of the most influential music promotors in the world, and Chet Helms and Bob Cohen of Family Dog Productions, who were at the center of the hippie and psychedelic rock movement in San Francisco, running the famed Avalon Ballroom. The Family Dog Denver, or "The Dog," put Denver on the music map by bringing in bands like The Doors, the Grateful Dead, Chuck Berry, Jimi Hendrix, Janis Joplin, Howlin' Wolf, Jefferson Airplane and many others. It also brought the legendary psychedelic poster artists of the era who did posters for many of the shows. It introduced one of the era's first liquid light shows -a precursor to the modern light show- and helped launch the career of Denver's Lothar and the Hand People, who went on to pioneer electronic music. The influence of The Family Dog Denver on Denver music and culture was detailed in a 2021 documentary, The Tale of the Dog.

=== Heavy metal ===
Led Zeppelin made their North American concert debut in Denver on Dec. 26, 1968 as the first of a three band bill that also featured Vanilla Fudge and Spirit. Queen also made their North American debut in Denver at the Regis Field House on April 16, 1974, opening for Mott the Hoople. Barry Fey, having moved on from the Family Dog Denver, promoted the shows.

By the eighties, Denver turned more toward the growing pop music of the decade. While the metal scene grew notably during the early eighties in the city, more so did the local funk, R&B, jazz-fusion and hip hop scenes. A small shock rock and Industrial metal scene developed in south Denver during the mid-nineties as a product of the vast underground metal and thrash scenes left over from the local hard rock up rise of the late seventies. In the latter 2000s, math metal, doom metal, and Powerviolence flourished in the inner city's many DIY (as well as legal) venues.

While mostly underground and still in existence today, Denver's metal scene has often been neglected by the press.

=== Grunge, thrash, 90's pop ===
With the 1980–90s came a new generation of music; grunge, thrash and nineties pop. Denver embraced all of these genres without trouble, most notably grunge. Local band The Fluid had several releases on the Sub Pop Record Label during this time. Like Seattle and a number of other cities who experienced the grunge boom, Denver fostered the genre in the early nineties before it quickly died out after the fall of the band Nirvana.

==== Jam and stoner ====
A number of festivals gained record attendance during the tenure of Mayor Wellington Webb, who worked to revamp the art community during his time as mayor. As a result of the melting pot of styles being exhibited in the music scene at the time, a new revolution came to light: jam bands. A direct result of many local metal fans fusing together with the vibrant jazz/funk and indie communities, the "jam band" style became prominent in Denver during the late nineties. Using methods common in sixties psychedelic groups and fusion artists such as Frank Zappa and Jimi Hendrix, jam bands were composed of a group "jamming" for extended periods, to which many genres were attributed. Local country music even entered the jam scene. In addition to the jam bands, stoner metal exploded in late nineties Denver as a response and as a complement to the jam scene. Using similar methods and popularized in trendy underground LoDo pubs, stoner metal was what many local hard rockers referred to as "the real product" of their endeavors. Legendary Desert rock acts such as Kyuss, Fu Manchu, and Earthlings? made frequent stops in Denver during the Palm Scene renaissance of the 1990s. John Tipton, an active member in the blues/jam scene since the early nineties, has been praised in local papers such as the Westword for his skills on guitar.

=== Punk ===
Since the international punk surge in the late seventies, the style had been common place in the diverse underground, but had not had enough of a boom to gain regional popularity. Denver's small punk scene did feature many innovative punk bands through the 80s however such as Bum Kon, Happy World, UTI and Horrorshow among others. Punk again started to gain momentum in the late nineties, while oppressed under the jam/stoner movement.

As the millennium dawned, so did the up rise of east and central Denver punk rock and math rock. Under the same scene, the two styles had labored under different schools in the metro area but found common ground in their late nineties oppression. While still somewhat alienated by the Denver mainstream today, local punk rock remains a staple in the genre's national scene, especially in respects to the metro area's reputation for lively hardcore concerts, such as that of the Aurora-based band Several Crowded Ghost.

=== Southern gothic ===
One of the largest and most influential scenes in Denver music during the 1990s and early 2000s was "southern" or "country" gothic, a style of dark and brooding Americana comprising elements of folk, country, and southern gospel. The rise of this style in Denver, referred to as "The Denver Sound", can be attributed almost single-handedly to the Denver Gentlemen which included Jeffrey-Paul Norlander and David Eugene Edwards and David's band 16 Horsepower and the many projects of the former members, such as Slim Cessna's Auto Club, Woven Hand (also consisting of Edwards), and Jay Munly & the Lee Lewis Harlots.

=== Classical ===
Denver has many performing ensembles dedicated to the Classical genre including the Colorado Symphony Orchestra, the state's only full-time professional orchestra. Various community groups include the Denver Philharmonic Orchestra (formerly the Centennial Philharmonic), The Colorado Wind Ensemble, and The Denver Brass. The major youth ensembles are the Denver Young Artists Orchestra, the Colorado Youth Symphony Orchestra, and the Colorado Honor Band.

Traveling opera companies have visited Denver since the 1860s. The first opera house was built there in 1881. Operas were produced locally beginning in 1915. The organization producing them, now Opera Colorado, was founded in 1981, and uses the Ellie Caulkins Opera House.

=== Garage rock ===
With roots in Punk/Surf/Soul, bands like Colfax Speed Queen, Ned Garthe Explosion, Dirty Few, In The Whale, The Ghoulies, Codename: Carter, Hula Hound, and Gilded Legion are all active garage-rock bands in Denver.

=== Electronic ===
Denver is known globally as being the "Bass Capital" of the world for its large dubstep community. It is the home to a large community of dubstep, bass, tearout, and riddim fans.

== Music venues ==
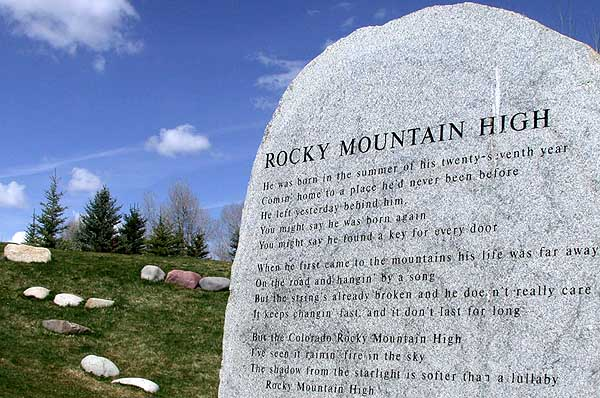
John Denver is memorialized at the park dedicated to him in his hometown of Aspen.

- The Family Dog Denver
- Bluebird Theater
- Boettcher Concert Hall
- Fiddler's Green
- Denver Center for the Performing Arts
- Ellie Caulkins Opera House
- Filmore Auditorium
- Levitt Pavilion
- Mercury Cafe
- Monkey Mania
- Ogden Theatre
- Red Rocks Amphitheatre (located in the foothill region of Morrison, Colorado.)
- Rhinoceropolis (Five Points Neighborhood)
- 7th Circle Music Collective (Former Blast-O-Mat)
- Hi-Dive (S. Broadway)

== See also ==
- Pet Sounds Studio
