= Family dog =

Family dog may refer to:

- A dog suited for a family; also known as a companion dog
- The Family Dogg, a British vocal group
- Family Dog (TV series) a short-lived American TV series
- Family Dog Productions, also known as The Family Dog, a music promotion group run by Chet Helms in San Francisco
  - The Family Dog, a concert hall in the Richmond District, San Francisco run by Family Dog Productions during the late 1960s
  - The Family Dog Denver, a concert hall located in Denver, Colorado run by Family Dog Productions (1967-68)
