= The Family Dog Denver =

Former music venue in Denver, Colorado

- "The Dog," "The Denver Dog"
- Interactive map of The Family Dog Denver
- Full name: The Family Dog Denver
- Location: 1601 West Evans Avenue; Denver, Colorado
- Coordinates: 39°40′43.22″N 105°0′23.64″W
- Owner: Chet Helms, Bob Cohen, Barry Fey

Construction
- Opened: September 8, 1967
- Closed: July 19, 1968

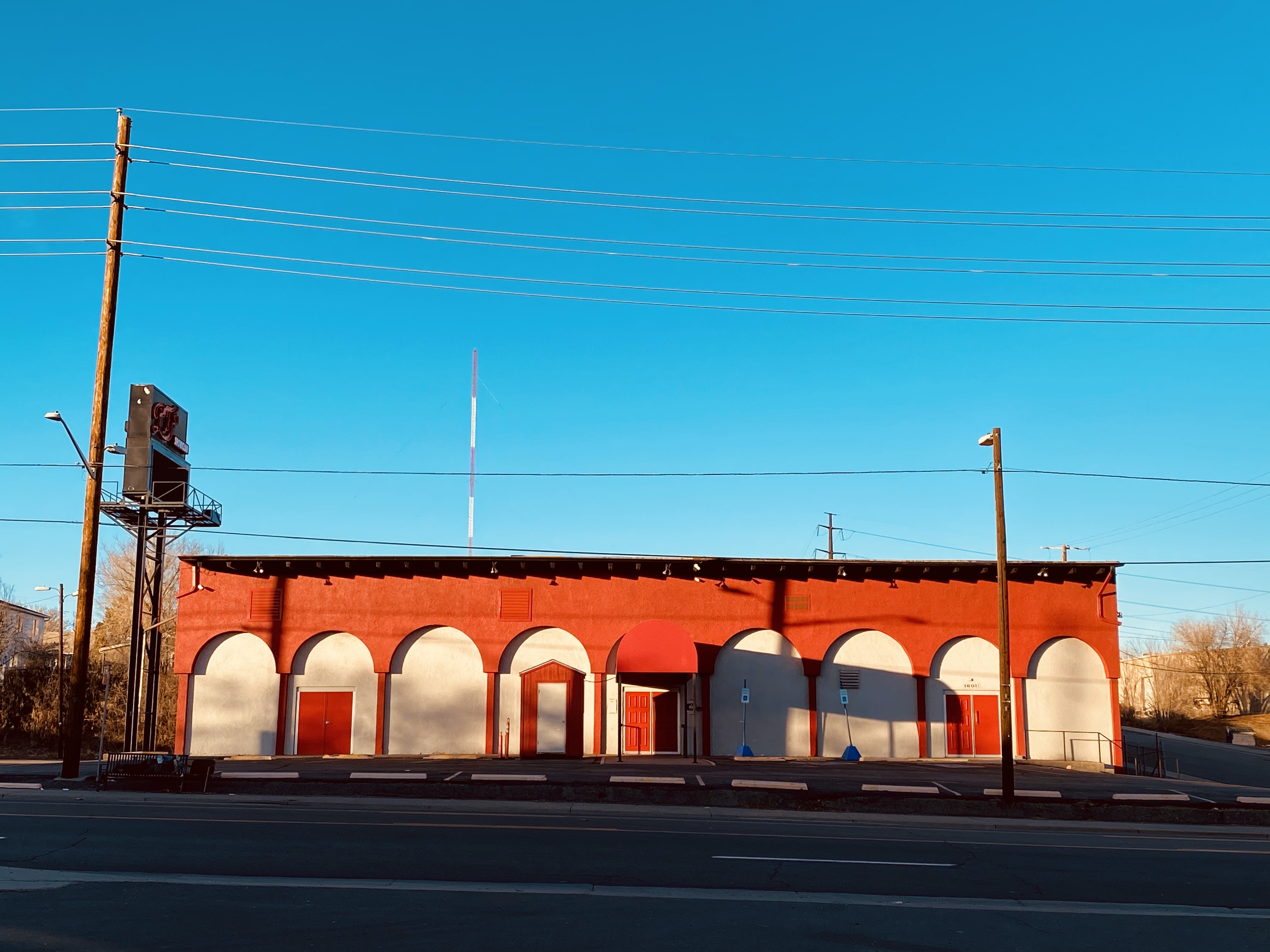
1601 W. Evans Ave, Denver, CO, 80223. Home of the Family Dog Denver, 1967-1968

The Family Dog Denver (also known as The Family Dog or simply The Dog) was a concert dance hall located at 1601 West Evans Avenue in Denver, Colorado. Opened from September 1967 to July 1968, it is regarded as a seminal music venue that launched Denver on its trajectory to its current status as a major concert destination by introducing never-before-seen acts like The Doors, Van Morrison, Jimi Hendrix, Cream, Buffalo Springfield, Janis Joplin, Chuck Berry, as well as the Grateful Dead's first performances in the state of Colorado in 1967. Many acts, like The Doors and Van Morrison, for example, had yet to become famous when they played The Dog, evidenced by the poster artists having to stylize the names of their leading songs into the poster art for the shows. The Family Dog is also seen as a cultural turning point in Denver from the conservative, western-minded sensibility of the early and mid-20th century to the current, liberal-minded climate. The venue's history, surrounding drama and ultimate impact had been largely unknown and unrealized until it was unearthed and detailed for the first time in the 2021 documentary The Tale of the Dog, produced and directed by Dan Obarski & Scott Montgomery and distributed by Cinedigm. As there are no useful photos, no video and little written history remaining of the Family Dog Denver, the film's oral history format told in first person by the people who were there serves as a definitive reference for “The Dog.”

== History ==
=== Pre-1967 ===
Denver, prior to the opening of the Family Dog, was not a major music destination. There had been a modest jazz scene in the Five Points neighborhood which hosted international acts such as Louis Armstrong and Duke Ellington. Beginning in the early 1960s there had also been a folk music scene, led by Harry Tuft at the Denver Folklore Center, who brought in the likes of Bob Dylan, Joan Baez and Judy Collins. Otherwise, most music venues, like the Exodus, Catacombs and The Cave, featured local bands with limited, if any, national exposure.

=== 1967: Barry Fey Meets Chet Helms ===
In early 1967, Barry and Cynthia Fey, who had been booking concert acts like The Association, Alice Cooper and Eric Burdon at the University of Denver, flew with his wife to San Francisco to meet with Chet Helms, co-owner (with Bob Cohen) of Family Dog Productions. At that time Helms was a primary figure in the San Francisco hippie scene, with his Family Dog Productions running the legendary Avalon Ballroom, where he cultivated acts like the Grateful Dead, the Jefferson Airplane, and Janis Joplin and Big Brother and the Holding Company.

The Feys brought with him a demo tape of a Denver psychedelic rock band named The Eighth Penny Matter as evidence that the music was popular in Denver and that importing the Haight-Ashbury music scene to Denver could be a successful business venture. They subsequently convinced Helms and Cohen to co-open up a music venue similar to the Avalon Ballroom, in Denver.

=== Summer 1967: The Human Be-In and the Love-In ===
The hippie scene had already been germinating in Denver by mid 1967. That summer on Sunday July 30 1967, a Love- In was held in Washington Park. The Love-In was organized by "Great American Tea and Cement Company of Denver," described as “a colony of working hippie artists.” Some of the local Denver bands that played at the Wash Park Love-In included Beggar's Opera Company, Hannigan's Greenhouse, and the Crystal Palace Guard. Odetta closed as the last performer at the Love-In that evening.

In order to jumpstart the Family Dog Denver, Barry Fey, and the leaders of the Dog, including Tony Guillory, James “Butch” Grayer, Marc Arno Richardson, and others, put on a Human Be-In Denver's City Park that summer, modeled on the famed event that took place in San Francisco in January of that year. The goal of the Be-In, in addition to generating interest in the Family Dog Denver, was to organize an event around the common sentiments of that time, including peace, love and brotherhood. Bands that played the Be-In included the Grateful Dead, Odetta, and Captain Beefheart. 5,000 people were reported to have attended.

=== Psychedelic Poster Art ===
With the impending opening of the Family Dog Denver, the arrangement was made for each of the concert posters to be done by the legendary San Francisco psychedelic poster artists, including Rick Griffin, Stanley Mouse, Alton Kelley, Victor Moscoso, Bob Schnepf, Bob Fried, and Dennis Nolan.

=== September 8 & 9, 1967: The Family Dog Denver Opens ===
The first concert at the Dog was Janis Joplin & Big Brother & The Holding Company, Blue Cheer & The Eighth Penny Matter. The poster for the show was designed by Rick Griffin.

=== Psychedelic Lightshow ===
As a result of bringing the San Francisco scene directly to Denver, Denver for a brief time had one of the first and potentially biggest, liquid light shows on earth, run by Diogenes Lantern Works and owner Marc Arno Richardson. The liquid light show was a groundbreaking experience where light was projected through textured glass that was filled with colored liquids and onto the walls of the Family Dog while the bands were playing. This was the precursor to the modern concert light show.

=== Lothar & The Hand People ===
A group of musicians from Denver formed the band Lothar and the Hand People in 1965. Using a theremin as their primary instrument, and subsequently being sponsored by Robert Moog, inventor of the synthesizer, Lothar and the Hand People took top billing over The Doors and Captain Beefheart when they played the Family Dog Denver for the first time in 1967. They went on to become enormously influential as one of the pioneers of electronic music and had an outsized impact on the development of rock & roll, with its members opening Electric Lady Land Studios with Jimi Hendrix, and helping to produce some of the most famous rock albums ever made.

=== Fall 1967: Police Take Notice ===
As the popularity of the venue exploded that fall, and the so-called hippie phenomenon and drug use that accompanied it became more prevalent around the city, parents and city leaders became concerned and exerted pressure on the police to shut down the Family Dog and eradicate the city of the hippies. Detective John Gray became the face of the police leading the efforts to get a hold of the situation at the Family Dog. This involvement lead to numerous municipal court cases as well as a federal court case.

=== Canned Heat Bust ===
One of the most controversial and dramatic episodes of the Family Dog's tenure was the bust of Canned Heat for marijuana possession, at the Ranch Motor Inn, located at Santa Fe and Florida Ave, prior to their scheduled show at the Family Dog on October 21, 1967. During this episode, Canned Heat claimed the Denver police planted the drugs on them. The Denver police deny this was the case. In order to pay their bail, Canned Heat signed over their publishing rights to Al Bennet of Liberty Records. Regardless of who was telling the truth, the result was that Canned Heat has never made a dime off of their major hits, including the Woodstock anthem, Going Up the Country.

=== December 1967: Chet Helms Pulls Out & Barry Fey Takes Over ===
Due to a combination of pressure from the city and miss-management of funds by the venue, by December 1967, after four months in operation, Family Dog Productions left Denver. After a brief closure, the Feys reopened the Dog and ran it themselves, bringing in acts like Cream, The Byrds Jimi Hendrix, and Janis Joplin.

=== July 1968: The Dog Closes for Good ===
As Barry Fey's vision grew, The Dog closed and he moved on to become one of the world's biggest and most influential rock promoters. The Feys started Feyline Productions, and helped pioneer and define the era of Rock promotion. Feyline held the 1969 Denver Pop Festival, Cynthia opened up the Denver concert venue Ebbets Field (rock club) with Chuck Morris. Feyline re-developed Red Rocks Amphitheater into a major concert venue, and opened the Rainbow Music Hall. Along the way Feyline was pivotal in the early promotion of countless bands like Led Zeppelin, Queen and Black Sabbath. Of particular note was Barry's promotion of the 1983 U2 Live at Red Rocks: Under a Blood Red Sky, which has been credited for catapulting U2 to global fame as well as making Red Rocks Amphitheater an internationally recognized music venue. He is also heavily responsible for helping save the Colorado Symphony Orchestra and for a decade-plus long effort to bring Major League Baseball to Denver, which helped land the Colorado Rockies franchise. Barry Fey was inducted into the Colorado Music Hall of Fame in 2012.

== Influence ==
According to the primary sources in the documentary The Tale of the Dog, the Family Dog Denver was the genesis of the city's current flourishing, world-class music scene. Specifically, it was Barry and Cynthia Fey's vision of bringing an Avalon Ballroom- type of venue to Denver and successful efforts to convince Chet Helms to open up the Family Dog in Denver that put Denver on the so-called music map permanently.

== Complete list of known concerts ==
- September 8,9 1967 – Big Brother & the Holding Company (with Janis Joplin), Blue Cheer, Eighth Penny Matter, Howlin’ Wolf:
  - (Bob Pennetta Denver native stated Wolf opened; Tale of the Dog documentary 50 second mark)
- September 15, 1967 – The Quicksilver Messenger Service, The Charlatans and Superband
- September 22, 1967 – The Grateful Dead, Mother Earth
- September 29, 1967 – Lothar & The Hand People, The Doors, Captain Beefheart & His Magic Band
- October 6, 1967 – Buffalo Springfield, The Eighth Penny Matter
- October 13, 1967 – Van Morrison, The Daily Flash
- October 21, 1967 – Canned Heat, The Allmen Joy (Hannigans Greenhouse filled in when Canned Heat was jailed)
- October 27, 1967 – The Allmen Joy, Lothar & The Hand People
- November 3 & 4, 1967 – Blue Cheer, Superfine Dandelion
- November 10, 1967 – The Other Half, The Sons of Champlin
- November 17, 1967 - Chuck Berry, The Sons of Champlin
- December 1, 1967 – Jim Kweskin & The Jug Band, Solid Muldoon
- December 8, 1967 – Canned Heat, Siegal Schwall Band
- December 15, 1967 – The Soul Survivors, The Box Tops, Jimmerfield Legend
- December 29, 30 & 31, 1967 – The Doors, The Allmen Joy, Gingerbread Blue
- January 12 & 13 Friday, Saturday 1968 - Beggars Opera Company, American Standard, The Eighth Penny Matter
- January 19 & 20 Friday, Saturday 1968 - The Eighth Penny Matter, October Country
- January 26 & 27 Friday, Saturday 1968 - Last Friday's Fire, The New World Blues Dictionary
- February 2 & 3 Friday, Saturday 1968 - Leopold Fuchs Hate Band, The Fugs

[*February 14, 1968 'After Party' Regis College Field House at 59th and Lowell for The Jimi Hendrix Experience.]

  - 'Jam session'Jimi Hendrix and Tommy Bolin jammed on February 14, 1968 at The Dog in Denver. No pictures exist. Jimi played bass and Tommy played guitar.[(Tommy Bolin Archives) (The jam session is also noted in Barry Fey's autobiography)]
- February 9 & 10 Friday, Saturday 1968 - The American Standard, Leopold Fuchs H. Bomb
- March 5 & 6 Tuesday, Wednesday 1968 - Blue Cheer
- March 8 & 9 Friday, Saturday 1968 - The Siegal Schwall Blues Band
- March 15 & 16 Friday, Saturday 1968 - Climax
- March 19, Tuesday 1968 - Magic Mice, Black Pearl
- March 20, Wednesday 1968 - Black Pearl, Cream
- March 27, Wednesday 1968 - Canned Heat
- April 6, Saturday 1968 - The Fugs
- April or May 1968 - Moby Grape, It's A Beautiful Day, Black Swan, and Indian Pudding and Pipe
- April ?, Wednesday, Friday, Saturday 1968 - “Winter” and The Conqueroo (with Johnny Winter)
- May 3, 1968 - Frank Zappa and the Mothers of Invention
- May 1968 - The Electric Flag
- June 8, 1968 - The Byrds
- June 14 & 15, 1968 - Josh White, Fever Tree
- June 28 & 29, 1968 - Big Brother and the Holding Company
- July 19, 1968 - Blue Cheer
