= Liquid Light Art =

Liquid Light Art is an artform which derived from the liquid light (live) shows from the 60's and 70's in combination with advanced photography. A Liquid Light Artefact is a printed still of a liquid light show. Liquid Light Art is a subgenre of psychedelic art.

== Technique ==
Like Liquid Light Shows, the base of a Liquid Light Artefact is water, water dye, oil and oil dye on a glass scale, above a lightsource. Additionally colour wheels, prisms, magnifying glasses, marbles and other transparent objects are used. The last decennia digital editing is being used increasingly.

Different from Liquid Light Shows, the Liquid Light Artefact is a motionless still, instead of a moving scene. Also, usually Liquid Light Shows are projected on a wall or screen, whereas Liquid Light Art is printed on concrete material. Therefore, it desires an advanced photographing and printing technique.
