= Mile High Stadium =

Former stadium in Denver, Colorado, US

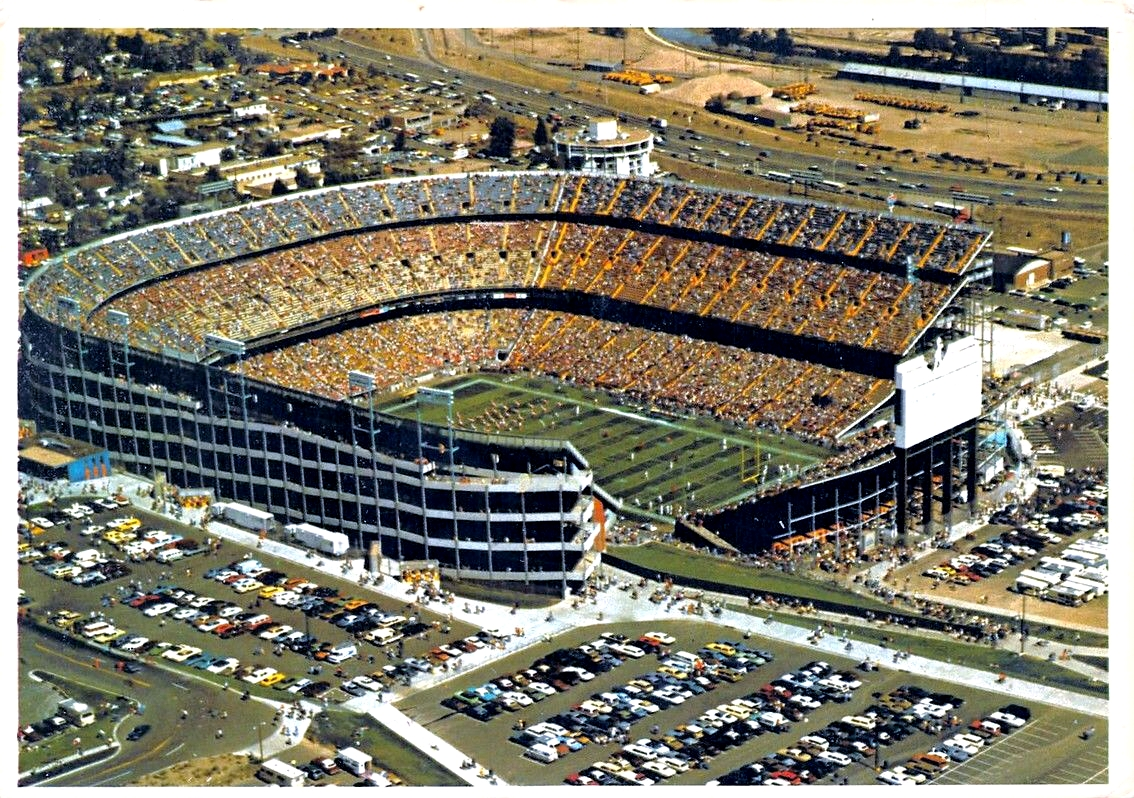
- Aerial view of Mile High Stadium circa 1980

- Location in Colorado Location in the United States Location in North America
- Interactive map of Mile High Stadium
- Former names: Bears Stadium (1948–1968)
- Address: 2755 West 17th Avenue
- Location: Denver, Colorado, U.S.
- Coordinates: 39°44′46″N 105°1′18″W
- Elevation: 5,280 feet (1,610 m) AMSL
- Owner: Rocky Mountain Sports, Inc. (Denver Bears/Broncos, 1948–1968); City & County of Denver (1968–2001)
- Operator: Denver Parks and Recreation
- Capacity: 18,000 (1948–1959); 34,657 (1960–1961); 34,264 (1962–1965); 34,643 (1966–1967); 50,000 (1968–1969); 50,705 (1970); 51,200 (1971); 51,656 (1972); 51,706 (1973–1975); 63,532 (1976); 75,087 (1977–1978); 75,092 (1979); 75,103 (1980–1981); 75,123 (1982–1983); 75,100 (1984–1985); 76,273 (1986–2001)
- Surface: Natural grass
- Field size: Left Field: 333 ft (101 m); Left-Center: 366 ft (112 m); Center Field: 423 ft (129 m); Right-Center: 400 ft (122 m); Right Field: 370 ft (113 m)

Construction
- Groundbreaking: 1947; 79 years ago
- Opened: August 14, 1948; 78 years ago
- Expanded: 1959, 1968, 1976, 1977, 1986
- Closed: September 8, 2001; 25 years ago
- Demolished: January–April 17, 2002
- Architect: Stanley E. Morse
- General contractors: Platt Rogers; Construction Company

Tenants
- Denver Bears (WL) (1948–1954); Denver Bears / Zephyrs (AA / PCL) (1955–1992); Denver Broncos (AFL / NFL) (1960–2000); Denver Dynamos (NASL) (1974–1975); Colorado Caribous (NASL) (1978); Denver Gold (USFL) (1983–1985); Colorado Rockies (MLB) (1993–1994); Colorado Foxes (APSL) (1994–1995); Colorado Rapids (MLS) (1996–2001)

Mile High Stadium (originally Bears Stadium until 1968) was an outdoor multi-purpose stadium located in Denver, Colorado from 1948 to 2002.

The stadium was built in 1948 to accommodate the Denver Bears baseball team, which was a member of the Western League during its construction. Originally designed as a baseball venue, the stadium was expanded in later years to accommodate the addition of a professional football team to the city, the Denver Broncos, as well as to improve Denver's hopes of landing a Major League Baseball team. Although the stadium was originally built as a baseball-specific venue, it became more popular as a pro-football stadium despite hosting both sports for a majority of its life.

The Broncos called Mile High Stadium home from their beginning in the AFL in 1960 until 2000. The Bears, who changed their name to the Zephyrs in 1984, continued to play in the stadium until 1992 when the franchise was moved to New Orleans. The move was precipitated by the awarding of a Major League Baseball franchise to the city of Denver, and in 1993 the Colorado Rockies season opened in Mile High. The team played the 1993 and strike-shortened 1994 seasons in Mile High setting MLB attendance records while Coors Field was being constructed in downtown Denver.

In addition to the Broncos, Bears/Zephyrs, and Rockies, Mile High Stadium was home to several other professional teams during the course of its history. The Denver Gold of the United States Football League called Mile High home from 1983 to 1985, and the stadium played host to the inaugural USFL championship game on July 17, 1983. Several professional soccer teams also played at Mile High. The first was the Denver Dynamos of the North American Soccer League, who were founded in 1974 and played their first two seasons in Denver before moving to Bloomington, Minnesota, and becoming the Minnesota Kicks. The second was the Colorado Caribous of the North American Soccer League playing just the 1978 season before moving to Atlanta and becoming the Atlanta Chiefs. The Colorado Foxes of the American Professional Soccer League played at Mile High from 1994 to 1995. Denver was home to one of Major League Soccer's 10 charter franchises as the Colorado Rapids were formed and played in Mile High from 1996 until 2001, making them the last franchise to play in Mile High Stadium prior to its closure.

After the Rapids' 2001 season, Mile High Stadium was closed and in 2002 the stadium was demolished.

== History ==
=== Early years as Bears Stadium (1948–1959) ===
Mile High Stadium was originally built as Bears Stadium for minor league baseball by Bob Howsam in 1948 at the site of a former landfill. The stadium initially consisted of a single 18,000-seat grandstand stretching along the north side from the left field foul pole to the right field foul pole on the west side. Luther "Bud" Phillips hit the first official home run out of Bears Stadium. In its first full season in 1949, the Bears averaged over 6,600 per game to lead the minor leagues in attendance.

In the late 1950s, there was an attempt to form a third major league, the Continental League, helmed by former Dodger general manager Branch Rickey. Howsam, who had worked with Rickey years before with the St. Louis Cardinals, joined ranks with Rickey, pleading for a major league team in Denver. Advised that to get a major league franchise Denver would need a much larger ballpark, Bears Stadium would begin the first of its many expansions. Over 8,000 seats were added to the south stands, bringing stadium capacity to 23,100.

Major League Baseball's (MLB) answer to the Continental League was to expand its two Leagues, which would eventually lead to the folding of the Continental League. Although Denver was not awarded a franchise, MLB promised teams in the future for Denver and other cities. Howsam was now trapped with a massive debt load and a stadium far too big for a minor-league team. Frantically searching for a solution, he concluded the only way out was to extend the stadium's season with football.

=== The Broncos as the primary tenant (1960–1992) ===
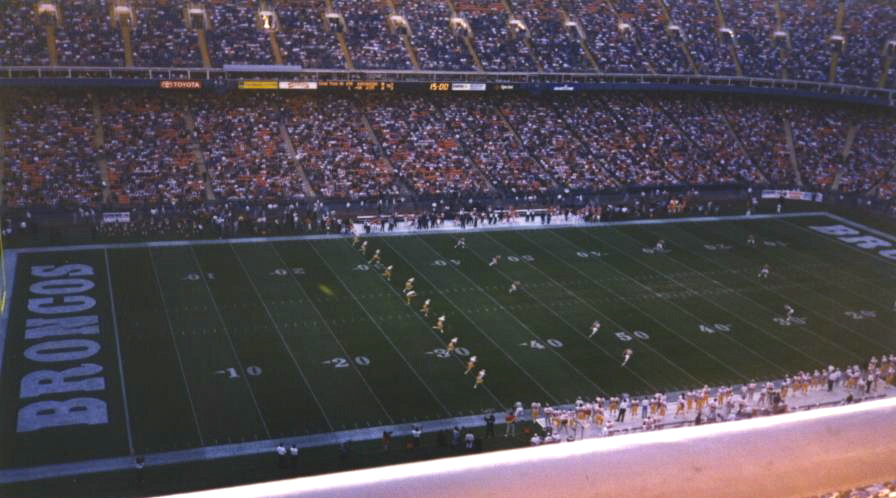
The Broncos at Mile High Stadium in 1996

A large bleacher section was added along the south side and temporary east stands were built in 1960, raising the capacity to 34,657; baseball capacity was 26,500 in 1963.

Howsam's ownership in the AFL was short-lived, as overwhelming debt forced Howsam to sell all his sports interests in 1961. His dream of major league baseball in Denver would be placed on hold for another 30 years.

One condition of including Denver in the AFL–NFL merger announced in 1966 was expanding Bears Stadium to at least 50,000 seats. This required adding second and third decks along the west sideline (first base line). This expansion was completed in 1968, when the stadium was sold to the city of Denver, which renamed it Mile High Stadium and built the upper deck along the west side, thus raising capacity to 50,657.

==== 1970s ====
Early '70s expansion

The Broncos sold out every game in their inaugural NFL season. Every Broncos game—preseason, regular season (not including games with replacement players) and playoffs—has been sold out since, a streak that continued after the Broncos left Mile High. As ticket sales increased, the stadium expanded to 51,706 seats. With a $25 million bond issue in 1974 another stadium renovation added more seats. By 1976, seating was up to 63,532 as the upper decks construction was completed along the north end zone (third base line).

The east stands

An ingenious expansion that took place from 1975 to 1977 raised the capacity to 75,103 by extending the upper deck that was along the north side and building movable, triple-decked stands along the east side. This expansion was designed by architect Jim Tolle, working for Denver-based architectural firm DMJM. When fully retracted toward the field, the stands would form a horseshoe for football, appropriate considering the team was the Denver Broncos. Yet when fully extended by 145 feet (44 m), the stadium could still fit a normal-sized baseball field with outfield distances of 335 feet (102 m) down the left-field line, 375 feet (114 m) to left-center and 423 to center field.

The movable structure was 450 feet (137 m) long, 200 feet (61 m) wide, and weighed nearly 9 million pounds (4,500 short tons, 4,000 metric tons). When a game or event required moving the stands the 145 feet (44 m) in or out, engineers pumped water into 163 water bearings spaced out beneath the stands, lifting the structure off its foundation. A sheet of water ⅓-inch thick formed under the structure. Hydraulic rams then pushed the stands forward at the rate of two feet per minute, taking stadium engineers about six hours from start to finish to move the stands.

The south stands

For many years, the south stands of Mile High Stadium were known for some of the Broncos' most active and vocal fans. Although the section wasn't associated with the level of bad behavior reported at other stadiums, its spectators were noted to contribute significantly to the stadium's crowd noise level despite the open gaps separating the south stands from the east and west stands.

Bucky Bronco

In 1975, Denver approached actor Roy Rogers to commission a statue of his horse, Trigger, for display at the stadium. A 24-foot (7.3 m), 1,300-pound (590 kg) fiberglass replica of the horse had previously been produced for the Roy Rogers Museum in Victorville, California. Rogers agreed, with the stipulation that the new statue not be named "Trigger". Denver fans were polled by The Denver Post to decide on a different name, and "Bucky" was chosen. Painted white to match the Broncos logo, the statue was mounted atop the scoreboard at Mile High, where it remained for 25 years before being relocated to the new stadium. Mounted, the statue measures 27 feet (8.2 m) and 1,600 pounds (730 kg).

==== 1980s ====
Mile High Stadium, in the 1970s and 1980s, was the only professional-caliber baseball facility to have an all grass infield, with sliding pits around bases. This unique feature was similar to several newer Major League Baseball stadiums that also used sliding pits, except those other stadiums all had artificial turf infields. In 1986, 77 luxury suites were added atop the west stands, increasing the official seating capacity to 76,123.

==== 1990s ====
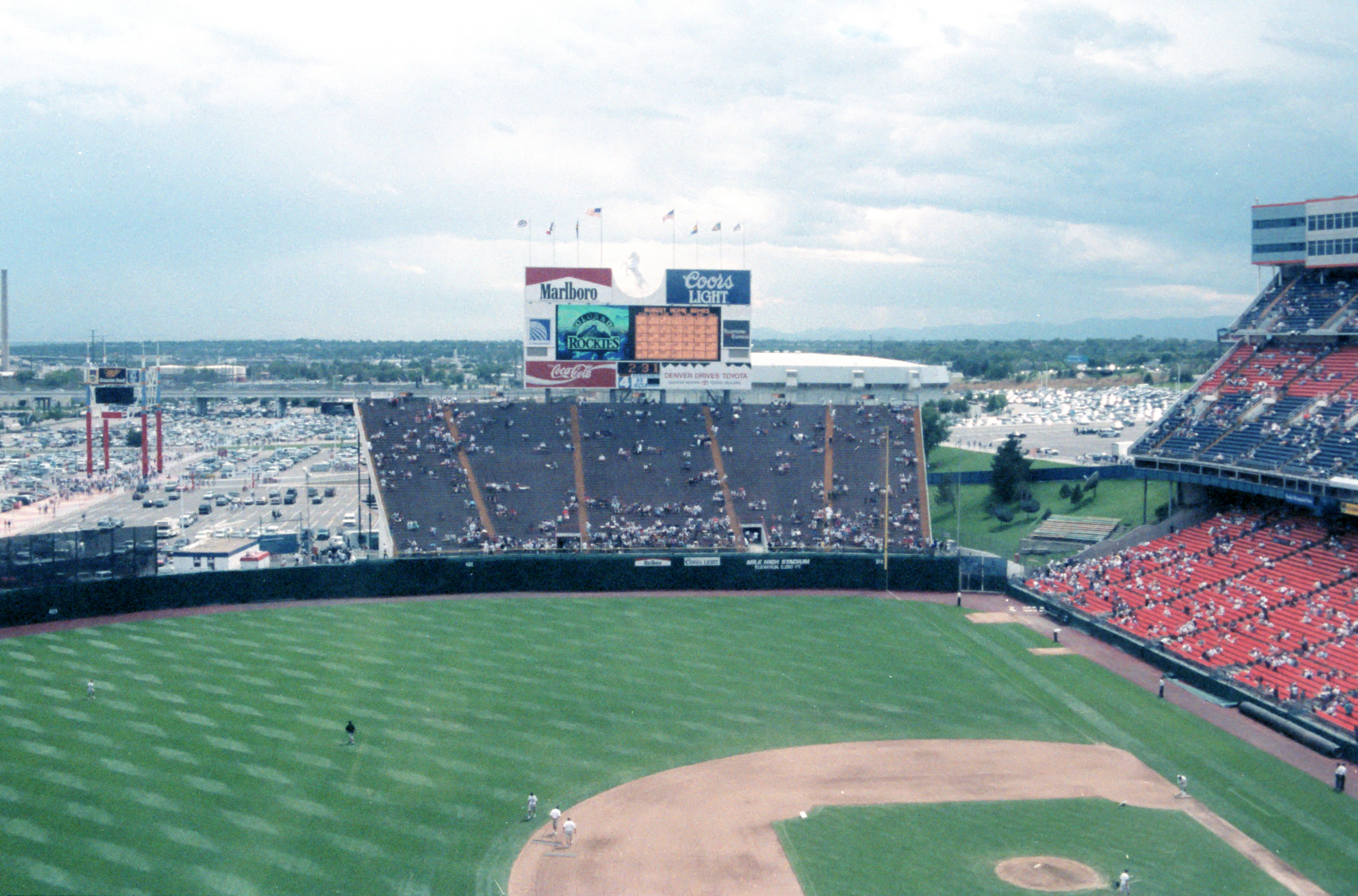
A Colorado Rockies baseball game at Mile High in 1994

The stadium's large capacity combined with enthusiasm for the new team and the lowest MLB ticket prices allowed the expansion Rockies to set Major League Baseball attendance records before moving to Coors Field for the 1995 season. The stadium was known for its loudness with the sound of fans stomping in the bleachers echoing within the horseshoe. The large center and right fields, foul territory areas (although left field was shorter than average), and center field's 30-foot (10 m) high fence, was not as problematic for pitchers as Coors Field would be. The club's 1993 season attendance was 4,483,350 in 79 home dates (81 games – 2 doubleheaders), an average of 56,751 per home date. The Rockies were on pace to exceed the record during the strike-shortened 1994 season. They had drawn 3,281,511 in 57 home dates (also 57 games), an average of 57,570 per home date. (Season attendance figures from The Sporting News Baseball Record Book, 2007, p. 234; Game counts are from game logs on Retrosheet.)

The Colorado Foxes of the American Professional Soccer League, moved into Mile High Stadium in 1994 and drew an average of 4,100 spectators in their first year. They were displaced in the 1996 season by the Colorado Rapids, one of the founding franchises of the top-flight Major League Soccer (MLS).

=== Final years (2000–2001) ===
The final football game at Mile High Stadium was December 23, 2000, in which the Broncos routed the 49ers, 38–9. The Broncos had defeated every visiting franchise from the stadium's opening to close, enjoying perfect records against the Arizona Cardinals (3–0), Baltimore Ravens (1–0), Carolina Panthers (1–0), Green Bay Packers (5–0), and Indianapolis Colts (5–0).

The Rapids were the final professional team to play in Mile High Stadium, staying until 2001. The team had sought a soccer-specific stadium as early as 1999 due to the lack of control at Mile High. Team captain John Spencer became the first Rapids player to record a hat-trick during a 3–1 win against D.C. United on Independence Day 2000 in front of 60,500 fans, a team attendance record. The Rapids played the last professional sporting event ever held at Mile High on September 8, 2001, a 2–0 loss to the Los Angeles Galaxy with 17,129 in attendance. The team were scheduled to move to Empower Field at Mile High for their season finale on September 12, but the match was postponed due to the September 11 attacks and ultimately cancelled.

Mile High Stadium was closed in 2001, after the Colorado Rapids and Denver Broncos moved to neighboring Empower Field at Mile High (then known as Invesco Field at Mile High), upon completion of the new stadium. The demolition of Mile High Stadium began in January 2002, an event covered extensively by local newspapers and broadcast live on television. The demolition was performed by Spirtas Wrecking Company of St. Louis, Missouri, the same group that led the demolition of arenas and stadiums in St. Louis, Pittsburgh and Seattle. Conventional demolition was chosen over implosion. The stadium demolition was completed by April.

The former stadium is now a parking lot for Empower Field at Mile High. A miniature replica of the stadium is in the parking lot. The historical site of many games and events for 40 years is marked by the hills forming the west and north stands, the corner between them descended by a staircase, much as the stands were. The location of home plate is identified by a marker located at 39°44′47″N 105°01′19″W.

== Notable events ==
=== Concerts ===
June 27, 28 and 29, 1969, concert promoter Barry Fey held The Denver Pop Festival at Mile High Stadium with many well-known acts performing every evening. The city of Denver supported the festival and made available areas for camping and other services. The Denver Police however allowed non-ticket holders to enter the parking area whereupon they attempted to climb over chain link fencing to see the show while claiming that music should be "free". Police responded by lobbing tear gas canisters toward the fences knowing full well that the gas would affect everyone in attendance at the outdoor venue. Sunday night's final act was The Jimi Hendrix Experience, which proved to be the Experience' final performance as a trio as well. Bassist Noel Redding quit and simply flew back to England that night. Jimi did not perform again for 6 weeks until mid-August when he closed The Woodstock Music and Art Fair with his new band. Jimi Hendrix died a year later in September 1970.

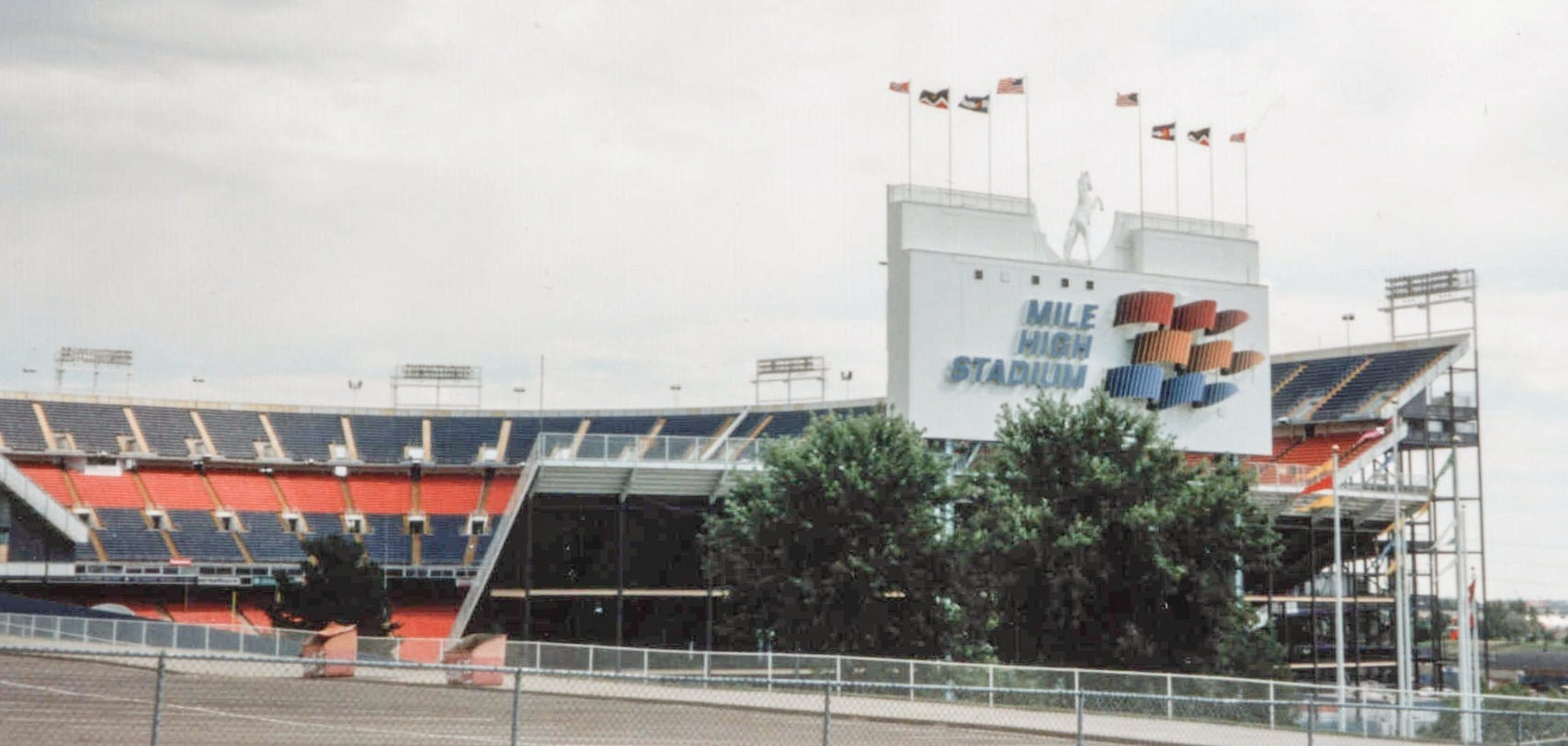
Mile High Stadium in 1995

Lynyrd Skynyrd played at the Stadium June 27, 1977, as part of their One More From The Road tour.

The Jacksons performed two concerts at Mile High Stadium on September 7 and 8, 1984, during their Victory Tour.

The stadium was the penultimate stop on Bruce Springsteen & the E Street Band's Born in the U.S.A. Tour, where they performed two shows on September 23 and 24, 1985.

The stadium hosted the final show of the 1988 Monsters of Rock Festival Tour, featuring Van Halen, Metallica, Scorpions, Dokken and Kingdom Come, on July 30, 1988. On June 28, 1991, the Grateful Dead performed in the stadium.

Metallica and Guns N' Roses brought the Guns N' Roses/Metallica Stadium Tour to the stadium on September 19, 1992, with Body Count as their opening act.

On October 21, 1992, U2 performed at Mile High as part of the third leg of their Zoo TV Tour. U2 would return again to perform in concert May 1, 1997, on the first leg of their PopMart Tour.

The stadium played host to Ozzfest on June 24, 1997. The stadium again hosted Ozzfest, for the second and last time, on June 21, 2001, and hosted the Area:One Festival on July 28, 2001.

=== In film ===
The stadium was featured in Michael Moore's 2002 documentary Bowling for Columbine as the backdrop for Moore's interview with controversial rock musician Marilyn Manson during the 2001 Ozzfest tour.

=== Other events ===
In 1977 and 1978, Mile High Stadium hosted the Drum Corps International World Championships (with the 2004 championships held at the successor stadium). From 1963 to 2019, the Denver-based Blue Knights Drum & Bugle Corps annually hosted Drums Along the Rockies, making it the single longest-running event held at the stadium and its successor aside from Denver Broncos football. Canceled in 2020 due to the COVID-19 pandemic, the event has since returned for the annual gathering, but has since moved to Colorado State University's stadium in Fort Collins.

Billy Graham held his "Rocky Mountain Crusade" at the stadium in 1987.

In August 1993, Denver hosted World Youth Day. On August 12 and 13, Mile High Stadium hosted two events with Pope John Paul II, the Papal Welcoming Ceremony and the Way of the Cross.

The weekend of June 16 and 17, 1995, saw Mile High Stadium transform into a revival tent when it played host to the Promise Keepers, a male-only Evangelical Christian ministry co-founded in 1990 by Bill McCartney, former head coach for the University of Colorado, Boulder football organization (CU Buffs for short). Membership in the Promise Keepers had skyrocketed year-over-year, such that their previous venue Folsom Field (seating capacity 53,613), located on the University of Colorado, Boulder campus, had outgrown their needs. Mile High Stadium was chosen because it could accommodate the 70,000+ men and boys that would fill the stadium that weekend.

Events and tenants
Preceded by None	Home of the Colorado Rockies; 1993–1994	Succeeded by Coors Field
Preceded by None	Home of the Denver Broncos; 1960–2000	Succeeded by INVESCO Field at Mile High
Preceded by None	Home of the Colorado Rapids; 1996–2001	Succeeded by INVESCO Field at Mile High
Preceded by Franklin Field	Host of the Drum Corps International; World Championship; 1977–1978	Succeeded by Legion Field
Preceded by Oakland Coliseum; Cleveland Stadium; Riverfront Stadium; Three Rivers Stadium	Host of AFC Championship Game; 1978; 1988; 1990; 1999	Succeeded by Three Rivers Stadium; Riverfront Stadium; Rich Stadium; Alltel Stadium
Preceded by None	Host of the United States Football League championship game 1983	Succeeded by Tampa Stadium
