= Liquid light show =

Psychedelic art form

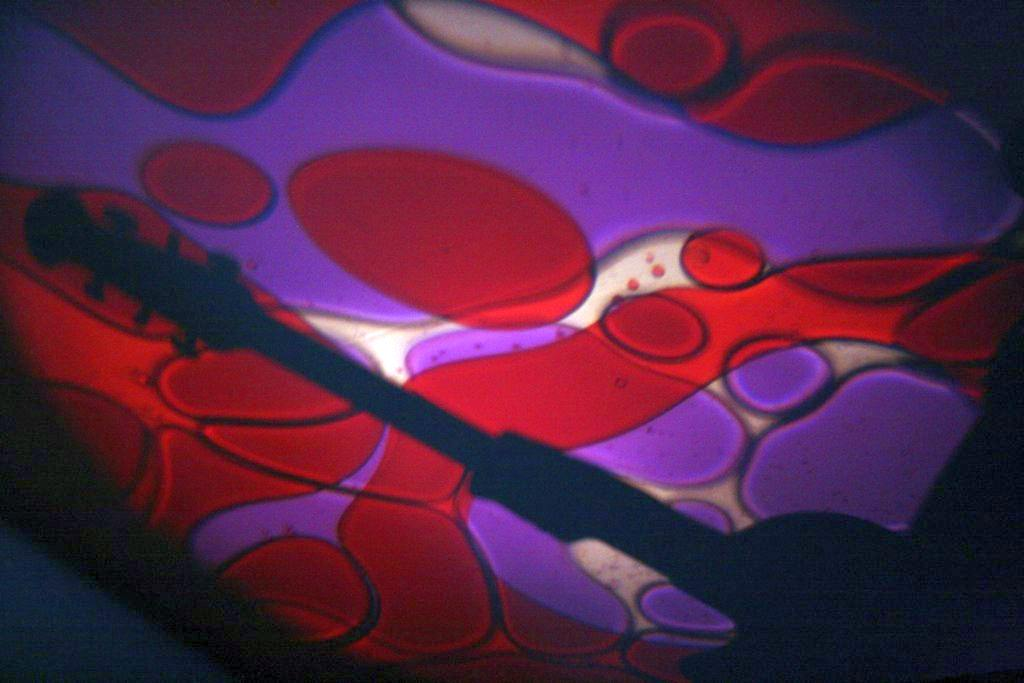
Light from a liquid light show, being projected behind a guitarist

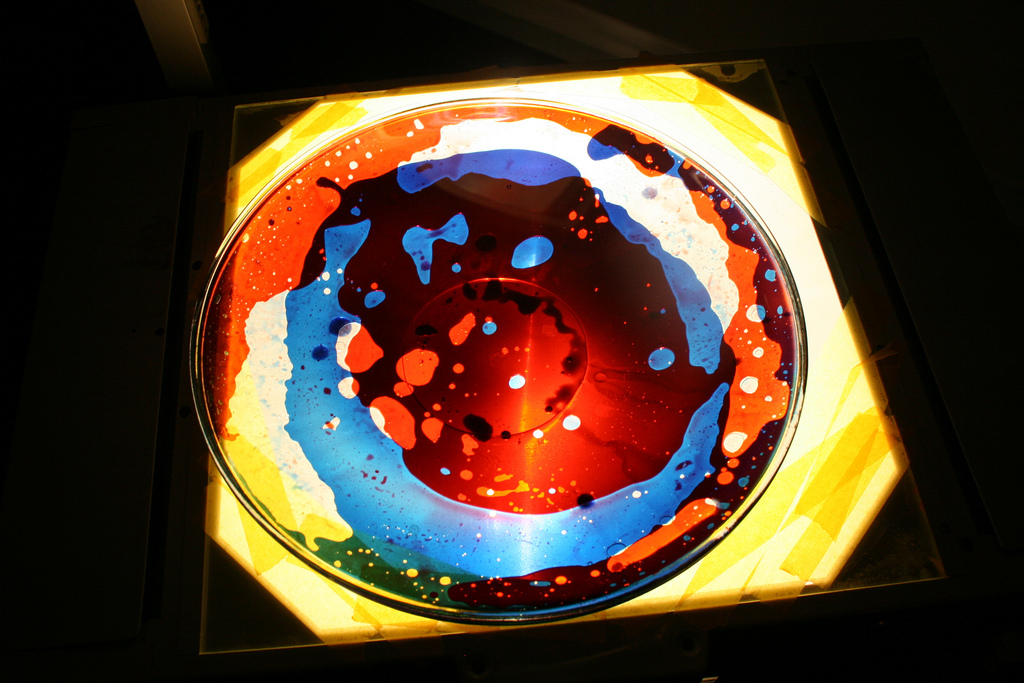
Layers of colored mineral oil and alcohol move over the projector lens and produce changing color patterns.

Liquid light shows (or psychedelic light shows) are a form of light art that surfaced in the early 1960s as accompaniment to electronic music and avant-garde theatre performances. They were later adapted for performances of rock or psychedelic music.

Leading names included Bill Ham, The Joshua Light Show/Joe's Lights/Sensefex located in NY, Tony Martin (SF, NYC), Elias Romero (SF), Mike Leonard (lights for Pink Floyd) (UK), The Heavy Water Light Show, Mark Boyle's Lights/Joan Hill (UK), Marc Arno Richardson’s Diogenes Lanternworks (SF, Denver), Lymbic System (Mark Hanau) (UK), Glen McKay's Headlights, The Pig Light Show (NY), Lights by Pablo (NY), The Brotherhood of Light (SF), Little Princess 109 (SF), LSD, Ed's Amazing Liquid Light Show, Abercrombe Lights (SF), the Single Wing Turquoise Bird light show (California), Sector (Alberto Zanotti) and Anna Patti (Italy). The Incredible Liteshow was run by Gary Gand in Chicago. Gand and his wife Joan went on to pioneer electronics in the Rock n Roll industry becoming the first Moog synthesizer dealer in the US and later the first Apple computer dealer in the music industry.

== History ==
Liquid light shows surfaced on both sides of the Atlantic around 1966 and were an integral part of the psychedelic music scene well into the seventies. Shows could be as simple as a single operator and two or three modified slideprojectors or overhead projectors and a couple of color wheels or as complex as shows with ten or more operators, 70 plus projectors (including liquid slide, liquid overhead, movie and still image models plus a vast array of highly advanced (for the time) special effects equipment).

The style and content of each show were unique but the object of most was to create a tapestry of multimedia live event visual amplification elements that were seamlessly interwoven, in a constant state of flux and above all, reflected the music the show was attempting to depict in emotional visual terms.

While the shows on both sides of the Atlantic had much in common they differed in two important ways. First, the American shows tended to be larger, with seven operators and over thirty projectors not being exceptional. In contrast, the shows in England and the continent of Europe seldom had more than three operators and ten or so projectors. Second, American shows were generally built around the overhead projector with the liquids in large clock cover glasses. Shows in England and Europe, in contrast, used modified 2" sq. slide projectors which had their dichroic heat filters (one or both) removed and employed two three or even four layers of slide cover glasses with one or two liquids (oil and water based, in the early days) between the glasses. Alternatively different coloured water based dyes were used in each layer, which slowly boiled producing pulsing vapour bubbles when exposed to the heat of the projector lamp with the heat filters removed. Consequently, randomly pulsing and moving blobs of colour were projected on the screen creating the light show. Before the projected layers totally dried out a new slide would be switched in the projector slide holder, meanwhile the old glass would be removed, cleaned and refurbished with new dyes and the projection process would continue. The surface tension of the liquids largely retained the mixtures between the glass slides, but the process was nevertheless very messy indeed and operators had their hands almost permanently stained by the dyes. A popular choice of colored liquids for light shows was Flo-Master ink, a product developed for use in permanent marker pens, also Vitrina which was intended for painting on glass. While these inks were very vivid they also had the problem of staining the operator's hands very deeply.

Two groups that are associated with the light shows they worked with above all others are Jefferson Airplane and the Headlights light show in America and Pink Floyd with light artist Mike Leonard in England.

== Leading shows ==
- Light Sound Dimension (LSD) was possibly the first psychedelic lightshow and was operated by Bill Ham. Ham pioneered kinetic lighting and actually used this technique at the Red Dog Saloon back in 1965. It was also at the Red Dog Saloon where Chet Helms first met Bill and asked him to produce lightshows at the Avalon Ballroom.
- The Joshua Light Show (also known as Joe's Lights and Sensefex) located in New York was founded by a filmmaker called Joshua White. The show was the 'house lightshow' at Bill Graham's Fillmore East for almost its entire existence. Formed from a lighting company called Sensefex which had been started by Joshua White, Thomas Shoesmith and Bill Shwarzbach, they moved to the Fillmore and became the Joshua Lightshow. Cecily Jaffe (at that time Cecily Hoyt) had now joined the team. Later they changed their name to Joes Lights having parted company with Joshua White. A video of Joshua White at work showing how some of the effects were achieved can be found here.
- The Holy See (SF) was formed by Ray Andersen (who had been a manager at the Matrix) and his wife Joan Andersen with the help of their friend John Blackwell and his wife. Their vivid lightshows were a staple during the psychedelic music heyday and they did light shows (usually at the Fillmore) for such bands the Jimi Hendrix Experience, Pink Floyd, the Doors, Ike and Tina Turner, the Grateful Dead, Big Brother and the Holding Company, Jefferson Airplane, It's a Beautiful Day, Yardbirds and many more. "We used about 15 to 20 projectors simultaneously in an evening," Ray Andersen stated. "We used overhead projectors and color wheels, strobes, clock faces, and dishes in various sizes. We mixed dyes, liquids, and oils and manipulated them. We used as many as a dozen carousel slide projectors or other slide projectors and as many as five movie projectors that would run either reels or loops. We used everything; you really had to work the limit." Ray also went to England to do lights for The Carnival of Light in 1967 featuring Paul McCartney.
- The Heavy Water Light Show (Mary Ann Mayer, Joan Chase and John Hardham, SF), did shows and album covers for Santana, the Jefferson Airplane and the Grateful Dead before moving into planetariums in the 1970s. The cover of the LP Santana III is an image (or set of images) from their show. Their work is characterized by extensive use of photographs and film sequences in addition to psychedelic oil effects.
- The Pig Light Show was started by Marc L. Rubinstein in July 1967 as Saint Elmo's Fire and included Larry Wieder, Patrick Waters and Mark Miller as its core in its early years. The name was changed after (in his own words) "a strange episode having to do with a Mothers of Invention concert at the Garrick Theatre in the Village", which resulted in Marc being given the local nickname "Pig", and the light show was known as Pig's Light Show. Many concerts including The Long Island Rock Festival which occurred over two Wednesdays in early August 1969 included ten who would play Woodstock a mere few days later would lead them to an “audition” at the Fillmore East in November of 1969 and through many performances elsewhere before taking over as House Light Show at Bill Graham’s Fillmore East in June of 1970 and as House Light Show at The Capitol Theatre in Passaic, NJ after the Fillmore’s closing in 1971. PLS also appeared weekly in the CBS Summer series “Comedy Tonight” with Robert Klein as well as Avco Broadcasting’s “Midsummer Pop” and ABC’s “Super Elastic Plastic Goggles” in 1970. After disbanding Pig Light Show (save for a show or two a year) Marc reintroduced Pig Light Show in 2007 in a digital improvisation performance platform.
- Lights by Pablo are best remembered for the Liberation News Service Benefit at the Hotel Diplomat in NYC in May 1969. The concert featured the MC5 (Motor City Five).
- Little Princess 109 became a house light show for Bill Graham Presents (BGP) in 1968. Little Princess 109 worked at the BGP venues Fillmore West and Winterland, in San Francisco, California, continuously from December 1968 until Fillmore West closed in July 1971. Little Princess 109 worked for Graham longer than any other of the West coast light show groups, and performed more concert nights than any show for the entire Fillmore/Fillmore West/Winterland period.
- Abercrombe Lights were formed in 1966 and did many shows at Bill Graham's Fillmore Auditorium. The man behind it all is George Holden, who is still very much a key player on the Bay Area lighting scene. Abercrombe Lights lit most of the SF bands over the years including the Grateful Dead, Country Joe and The Fish and Jefferson Starship.
- Diogenes Lanternworks was a classic liquid light show provided by Marc Arno Richardson at Chet Helms' Avalon Ballroom in San Francisco and The Family Dog Denver in 1967. Diogenes’ light shows can be seen credited on nearly all of the psychedelic posters done for the shows, many by Rick Griffin, Victor Moscoso, Stanley Mouse, Alton Kelly and others.

== See also ==
- VJ (video performance artist)
