= Atlantic City Pop Festival =

1969 Music Festival in Atlantic County, New Jersey

- Genre: Rock, pop, etc.
- Dates: August 1, 2 and 3rd
- Locations: Hamilton Township; United States
- Years active: 1969
- Attendance: 100,000+

The Atlantic City Pop Festival took place in 1969 on August 1, 2 and 3rd at the Atlantic City race track, two weeks before Woodstock Festival. It actually took place in Hamilton Township at the Atlantic City Race Course. There was heavy security at the festival, and the stage the acts performed on was created by Buckminster Fuller. A ticket for the entire 3-day weekend was $15.00 to see all of the performers listed. Attended by some 100,000+ people.

== Performers ==
The festival featured the following performers:

- Aum
- Booker T. & the M.G.'s
- Tim Buckley
- The Paul Butterfield Blues Band
- The Byrds
- Canned Heat
- The Chambers Brothers
- Chicago Transit Authority
- Joe Cocker
- The Crazy World of Arthur Brown
- Creedence Clearwater Revival
- Crosby, Stills & Nash (billed, but did not perform)
- Cass Elliot
- Iron Butterfly
- Jefferson Airplane
- Dr. John the Night Tripper
- Janis Joplin
- B.B. King
- Lighthouse
- Little Richard
- Looking Glass
- Lothar and the Hand People
- Mississippi Fred McDowell
- Hugh Masekela
- Buddy Miles
- Joni Mitchell
- The Mothers of Invention
- Tracy Nelson & Mother Earth
- Procol Harum
- Buddy Rich
- Biff Rose
- Santana
- Sir Douglas Quintet
- Three Dog Night
- The American Dream
- Johnny Winter (billed, but did not perform Friday as scheduled but moved to last act Sunday night)

== Highlights ==
Lineup changes:

- The Moody Blues were scheduled but the band did not appear.
- Blues guitarist Johnny Winter was present but unable to perform because of equipment trouble.
- Janis Joplin and Mama Cass introduced Santana as their favorite band; this was their first appearance on the East Coast.

== See also ==
- List of historic rock festivals
- List of music festivals in the United States
