= E. J. Sullivan =

British artist (1869–1933)

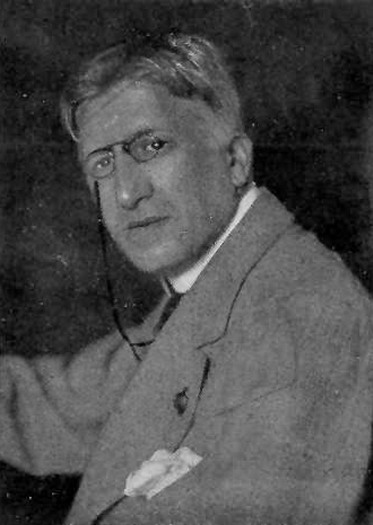
- E. J. Sullivan
- Born: Edmund Joseph Sullivan; 1869; Putney, London, England
- Died: 1933 (aged 63–64); U.K.
- Known for: Magazine and book Illustration
- Movement: Art Nouveau

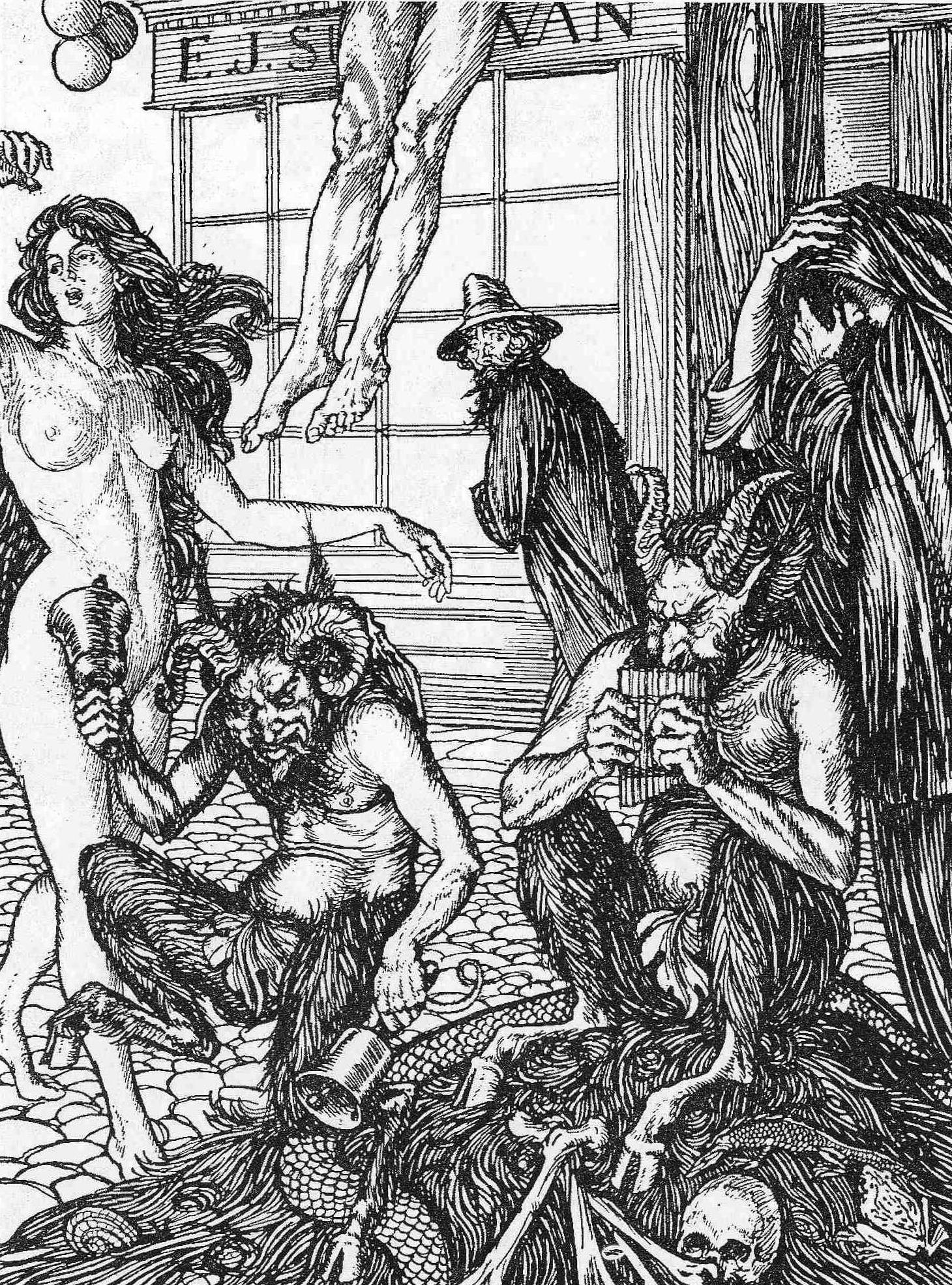
Teufelsdröckh in Monmouth Street, illustration to Sartor Resartus by Thomas Carlyle.

Edmund Joseph Sullivan (1869–1933), usually known as E. J. Sullivan, was a British book illustrator who worked in a style which merged the British tradition of illustration from the 1860s with aspects of Art Nouveau.

== Life ==
Sullivan was born in Putney, South West London to Michael Sullivan, an Irish art teacher at a Roman Catholic school in Mortlake, and Mary Anne (née Melady). He was the second eldest son and third eldest of twelve children. In the early 1870s, the family moved north to Kendal, Westmoreland before moving again to Hastings, Sussex later in the decade.

Sullivan decided to concentrate on the emerging field of graphic design and book illustration, which was flourishing at the end of the nineteenth century. Sullivan worked at the Daily Graphic from the age of nineteen, moving to the Pall Mall Magazine in 1893. During this period he produced standard news and portrait illustrations, but began to work on illustrations to literature at the magazine. He soon graduated to the more prestigious role of book illustrator, producing illustrations for editions of Lavengro and the plays School for Scandal and The Rivals. Sullivan's style is comparable to that of Aubrey Beardsley, but is more romantic than Beardley's acerbic manner.

He also illustrated The Compleat Angler and Tom Brown's Schooldays. By the end of the decade Sullivan's designs were in high demand, leading to the publication of his most ambitious work, an illustrated edition of Thomas Carlyle's Sartor Resartus, published in 1898. This contains 79 illustrations ranging from emblems to full page pictures. Sullivan adapted his style to use the faux-Rococo techniques he had developed in his play-illustrations in order to combine them with bizarre images of strange fantastical figures, drawing on the genre of the grotesque. Sullivan later also illustrated Carlyle's The French Revolution, though his work was far less varied than for Sartor Resartus. He used the same combination of Rococo and Grotesque to emphasise the violence erupting into the decorative world of Louis XVI and Marie Antoinette's court.

Later books include The Rubaiyat of Omar Khayyam, first published in 1913 and in many subsequent editions. Here, among many fanciful and beautiful black-and-white drawings, he used images of skeletons and animated pots. One such skeleton image was appropriated by Stanley Mouse and Alton Kelley for a Grateful Dead poster in 1966, and album cover in 1971. Sullivan also used his skills of satire in 1916 in a collection of wartime designs called the Kaiser's Garland, which attack Prussian militarism.

Sullivan was one of the leading illustrators selected by Percy Bradshaw for inclusion in his The Art of the Illustrator (1917-1918) which presented a separate portfolio for each of twenty illustrators. (Note: The portfolio contained: a brief biography of Sullivan, an illustration of Sullivan at work in his studio, an explanation of Sullivan's method of working. This was accompanied by a plate showing an illustration typical of his work and five other plates showing the work at five earlier stages of its production, from the first rough to the just before the finished drawing or colour sketch. Sullivan's pen and ink illustration shows an artist in the clutter of his studio glumly looking on as a naked model admires herself in a hand mirror.) He served as a Master of the Art Workers' Guild in 1931 and taught illustration at Goldsmiths' School of Art.

== Notable works ==
=== Books Illustrated ===
- William Ernest Henley – A London Garland: Selected From Five Centuries of English Verse (Macmillan, 1895)
- George Borrow – Lavengro (Foulis, 1896)
- Thomas Hughes – Tom Brown's School Days (Macmillan, 1896)
- Izaak Walton – The Compleat Angler (Dent, 1896)
- Richard Brinsley Sheridan — The School For Scandal (and) The Rivals (Macmillan, 1896)
- Captain Frederick Marryat – The Pirate (and) The Three Cutters (Macmillan, 1897)
- Captain Frederick Marryat – Newton Forster (Macmillan, 1897)
- Thomas Carlyle – Sartor Resartus (Bell, 1898)
- Alfred, Lord Tennyson – Maud (Macmillan, 1900)
- Alfred, Lord Tennyson — A Dream of Fair Women and Other Poems (Richards, 1900)
- Gilbert White – The Natural History and Antiquities of Selborne (Freemantle, 1900–01)
- Robert Burns – Poems (1901)
- Leigh Hunt – The Old Court Suburb. Or, Memorials of Kensington (Freemantle, 1902)
- Robert Barr – A Prince of Good Fellows (Chatto & Windus, 1902)
- Thomas Lodge – Rosalynde (1902)
- Washington Irving – The Sketch Book (1902)
- Oliver Goldsmith – Letters From A Citizen of The World To His Friend In The East (Wells Gardner, Darton, 1904)
- H. G. Wells – A Modern Utopia (Chapman & Hall, 1905)
- Friedrich de la Motte Fouqué — Sintram and His Companions (Methuen, 1908)
- Thomas Carlyle – The French Revolution: A History (Chapman & Hall, 1910)
- John Keats – Poems (T. C. & E. C. Jack, 1910)
- William Shakespeare – The Works of Shakespeare (Photogravures) (Dent, 1911)
- Omar Khayyam — Rubaiyat of Omar Khayyam (Methuen, 1913)
- Oliver Goldsmith – The Vicar of Wakefield (Constable, 1914)
- E. J. Sullivan — The Kaiser’s Garland (Cartoons) (1915)
- George Outram – Legal and Other Lyrics (Foulis, 1916)
- E. J. Sullivan – The Art of Illustration (Chapman & Hall, 1921)
- E. J. Sullivan – Line, An Art Study (Chapman & Hall, 1922)
- E. J. Sullivan – Still-Life and Flowers (Press Art School, 1929)

=== Contributions ===
- The Graphic (1889)
- The Daily Graphic (1890)
- The English Illustrated Magazine (1891–4)
- Pall Mall Budget (1893)
- The Yellow Book (1894)
- Daily Chronicle (1895)
- The New Budget (1895)
- Good Words (1896)
- The Lady's Pictorial (1898)
- The Pall Mall Gazette (1899)
- Black & White (1900)
- The Strand Magazine (1903, 1910–11)
- Punch (c. 1920)

Also Penny Illustrated Paper, The Pall Mall Magazine, The Gentlewoman, The Ludgate Monthly, The Windsor Magazine, and Pearson's Magazine.

== Gallery ==
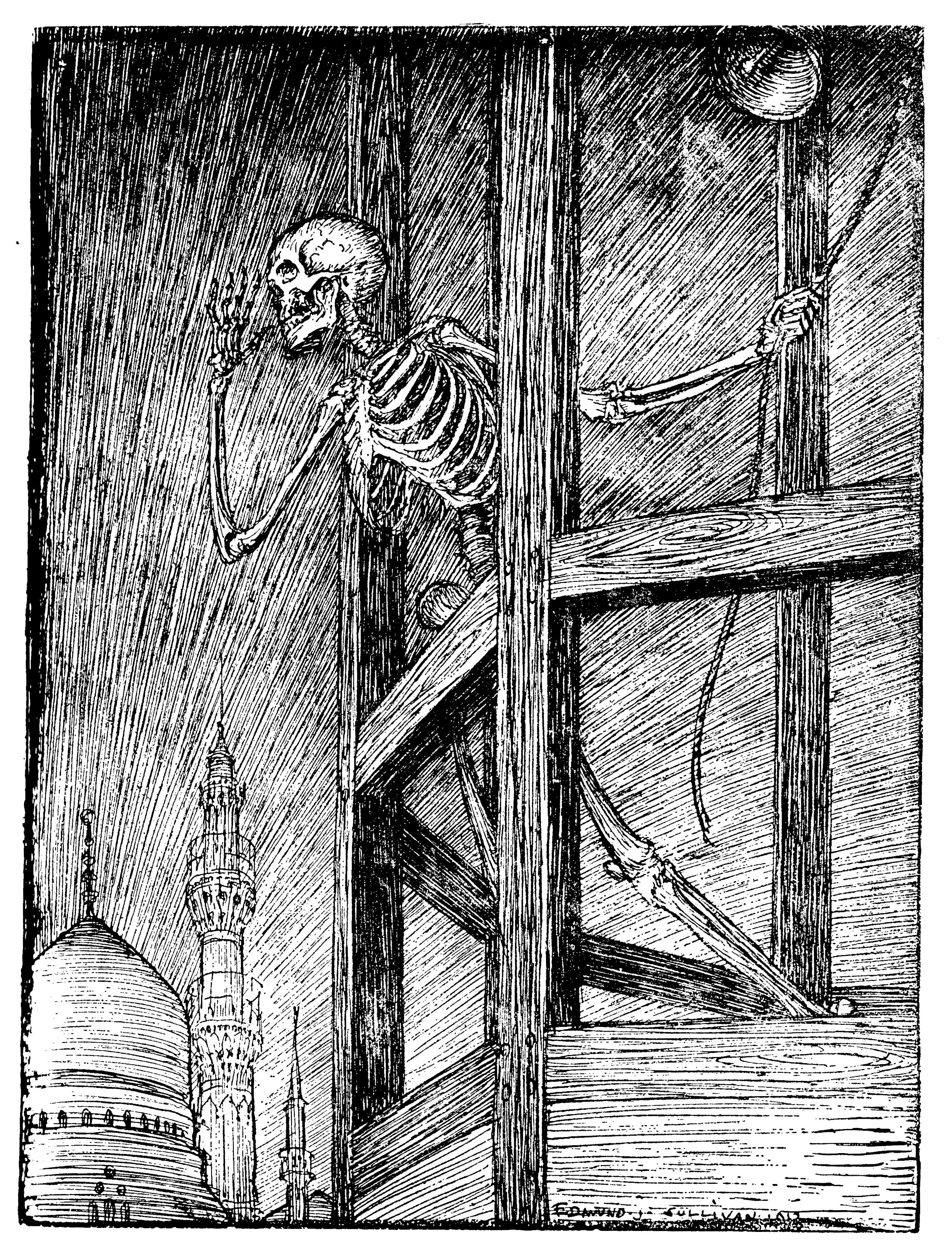
Sullivan's illustration for Quatrain 24 of Edward Fitzgerard's First Version of the Rubaiyat of Omar Khayyam.

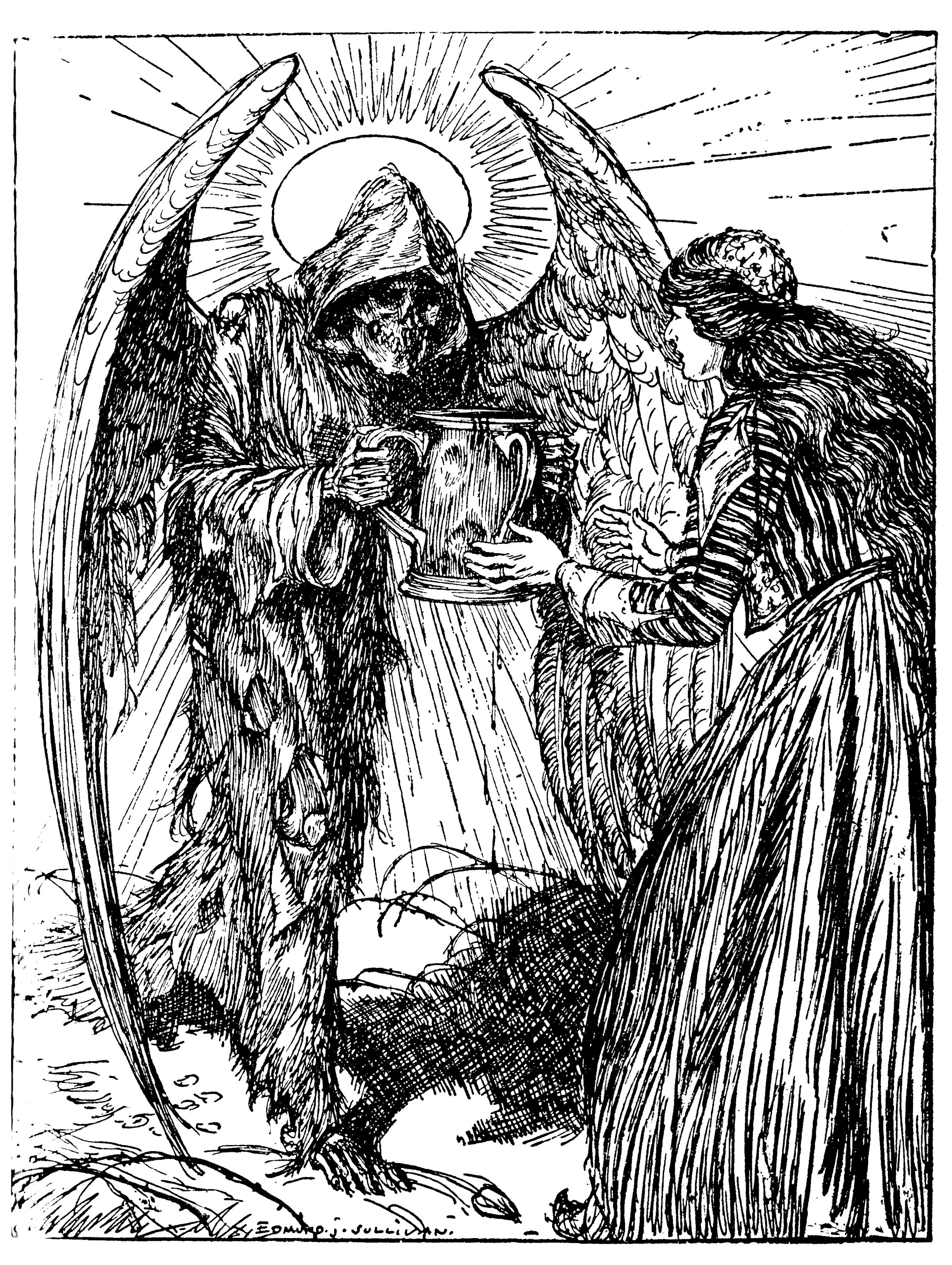
Sullivan's illustration for Quatrain 48 of Edward Fitzgerard's First Version of the Rubaiyat of Omar Khayyam.

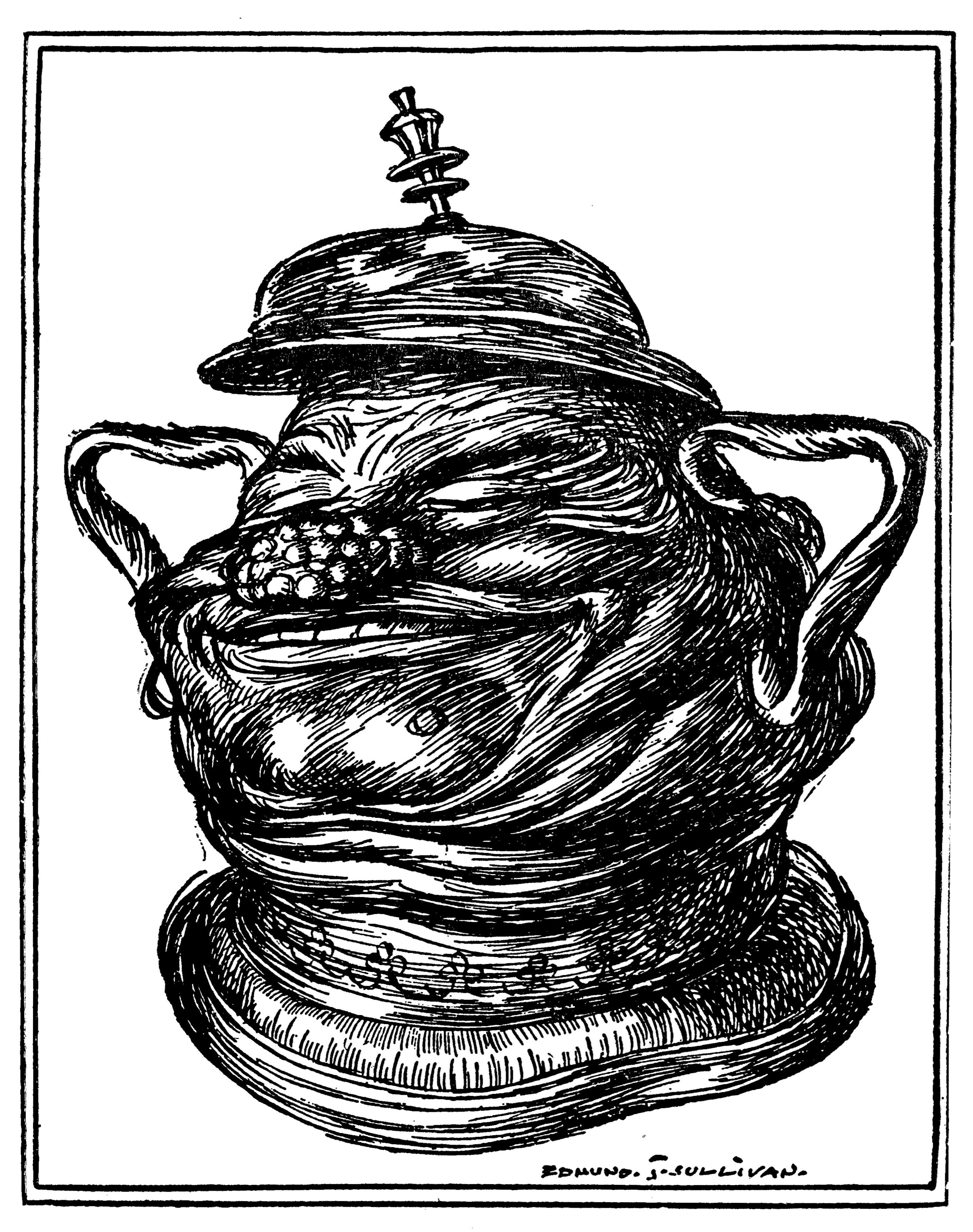
Sullivan's illustration for Quatrain 64 of Edward Fitzgerard's First Version of the Rubaiyat of Omar Khayyam.

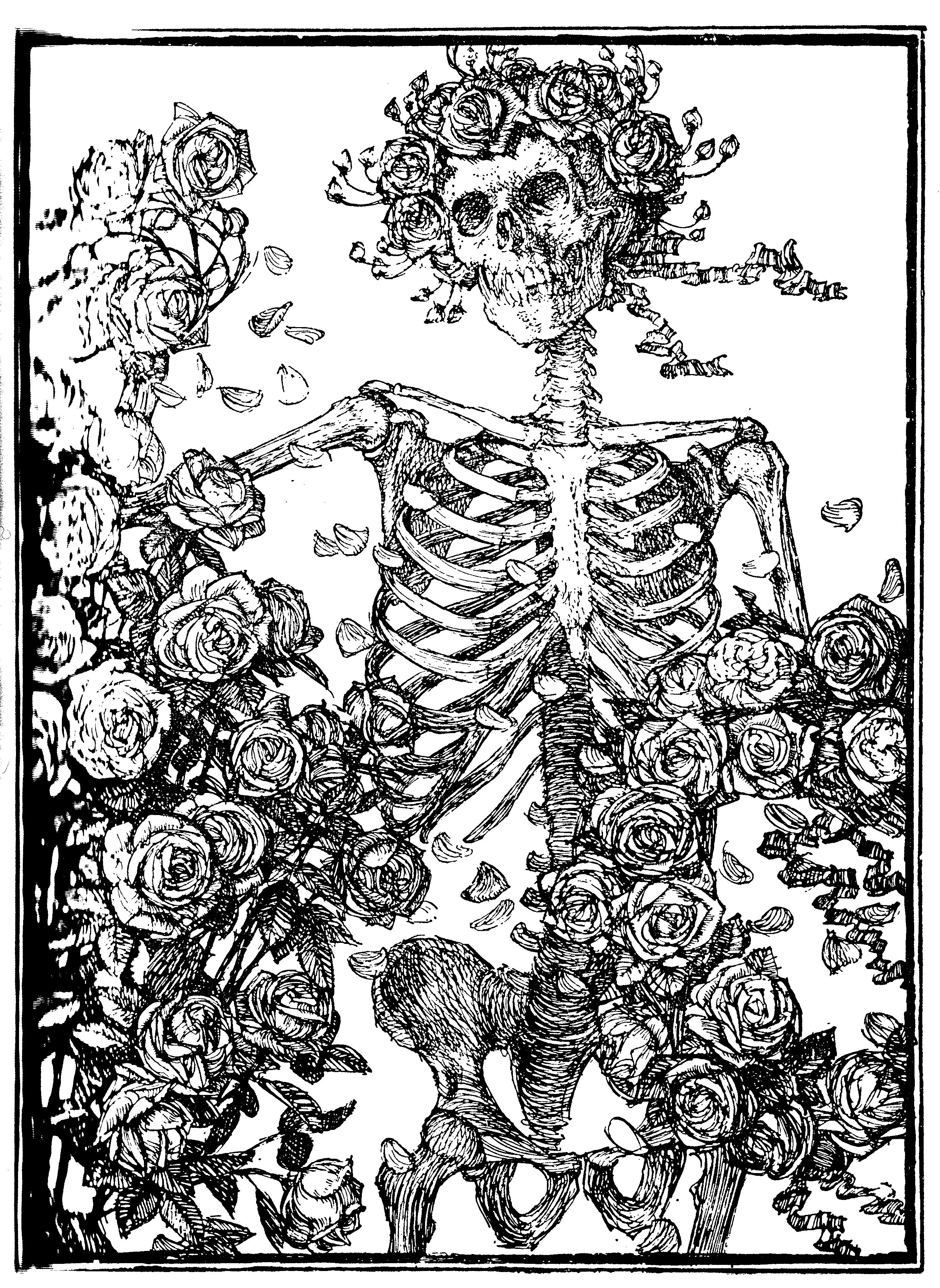
Sullivan's illustration
