= Floods in Colorado =

Floods in Colorado include the flood of 1844 which filled the South Platte valley from "bluff to bluff" to the recent Denver floods of 1965 and the 2013 Colorado floods.

Colorado floods are of two types: floods covering a large area resulting from heavy regional rainfall or snowmelt and flash floods resulting from isolated cloudbursts such as the Big Thompson flood of 1976. Upslope winds bringing Gulf moisture to streams draining the Colorado Piedmont, the Denver Convergence Vorticity Zone, at the western edge of the High Plains and to the streams of the Front Range are associated with most flooding. Floods on the Western Slope and in the San Luis Valley such as the floods of October 1911 depend on rare infusions of substantial Pacific moisture.

== The Colorado Piedmont ==
Streams in the highlands bordering the Front Range at the western edge of the High Plains include Plum Creek and Cherry Creek which are upstream of Denver, and Bijou and Kiowa Creeks which drain highlands to the east of Denver. Until it was dammed in 1950 by Cherry Creek Dam Cherry Creek regularly flooded downtown Denver. Plum Creek was dammed by the Chatfield Reservoir after the 1965 flood.

== Arkansas River ==
The Arkansas River flooded from Florence, Colorado to the Kansas line June 3 to June 5, 1921 following cloudbursts west of Pueblo resulting in substantial loss of life and property.

The first flood was caused by heavy rain on Dry Creek just above Pueblo on the night of June 2; the second was the main flood, which occurred during the night of June 3; and the third was that due to the breaking of the Schaeffer reservoir, on Beaver Creek, on the morning of June 5.

Following an earlier flood in 1894 the river though Pueblo had been channeled through levees with a capacity of 40,000 cubic feet per second (1,100 cubic meters per second). In the evening of June 3, warning of an advancing wall of water was made, but rather than fleeing, hundreds lined the levees to watch; 78 bodies were recovered. The extensive railyards were wrecked and the business section flooded as the levees broke under an onslaught of 100,000 cubic feet per second (2,800 cubic meters per second) of water. The Arkansas was dammed immediately upstream of Pueblo in 1975 by the Pueblo Dam.

Augmented by flood waters from Fountain Creek, the Saint Charles River, and other tributaries, the flow increased to 200,000 cubic feet per second (5,700 cubic meters per second) as the crest passed through La Junta over several hours during the afternoon of June 4.

== See also ==
- 1976 Big Thompson River flood
