= Denver Pop Festival =

Music festival in Colorado, U.S.

- Genre: Rock, pop, etc.
- Dates: June 27–29, 1969
- Locations: Mile High Stadium; Denver, Colorado, U.S.
- Years active: 1969
- Founders: Barry Fey
- Attendance: 50,000 (est.)

The Denver Pop Festival was a three-day music festival in 1969 promoted by Barry Fey (Feyline) and held June 27–29. Largely overshadowed by Woodstock two months later, it was held at Mile High Stadium in Denver, Colorado, and the peak attendance was estimated at 50,000.

== History ==
Unlike the free-form happening in upstate New York, the Denver festival had the full support and local resources of a major city, taking place in Denver at Mile High Stadium. There were high expectations for the Festival; it was commonly called the "First Annual" Denver Pop Festival. The peak attendance was estimated at 50,000, though on Sunday when it was declared a free festival, that number may have been higher. Ticket prices were six dollars per day, or $15 for all three days (Friday, Saturday, Sunday).

Frank Zappa is credited by some with inventing the audience wave during his set. He assigned sections of the stadium (audience) to each make different odd sounds and gestures, including standing with arms raised. He then "played" a "tune" on his "crowd instrument".

The festival featured the final performance of The Jimi Hendrix Experience, then the highest paid act in rock. (Noel Redding left the Experience on June 29, 1969.)

== Performers ==
=== June 27 ===
- Ike & Tina Turner
- Big Mama Thornton
- The Flock
1. Clown
2. Store Bought, Store Thought
- Three Dog Night
1. Liar
2. Celebrate
3. One
4. Drum Solo - Floyd Sneed performed his amazing solo featuring his "Lafrican" method of playing the drums for an aspiring 10+ minutes including over 3 minutes of Congo style hand playing.
- Frank Zappa and The Mothers of Invention
1. Hungry Freaks Daddy
2. Downtown Talent Scout (long version, called "The Heat's Out Every Night")
3. The String Quartet
4. Some Ballet Music
5. A Pound for a Brown on the Bus
6. Zappa conducts the audience ("Teenage Stereo")
- Iron Butterfly

=== June 28 ===
- Aorta
- Zephyr (with Tommy Bolin)
- Poco
- Johnny Winter
1. Rollin' & Tumblin'
2. Help Me
3. Leland Mississippi
4. Going Down Slow
5. Mean Town Blues
6. I'm Not Sure
7. It's My Own Fault
- Tim Buckley
1. Dolphins
2. Gypsy Woman
3. Buzzin' Fly
4. The Train
- Creedence Clearwater Revival
1. Bad Moon Rising - note: the moon rising large and bright behind the stage at dusk prompting an immediate encore performance.

=== June 29 ===
- Aum
- Zephyr (with Tommy Bolin) << Their Sunday show was not scheduled, they were filling in for an act that dropped out.
- Rev. Cleophus Robinson
- Joe Cocker
- Three Dog Night
- The Jimi Hendrix Experience (final performance together)
1. Tax Free
2. Hear My Train A Comin'
3. Fire
4. Spanish Castle Magic
5. Red House
6. Foxy Lady
7. Star Spangled Banner
8. Purple Haze
9. Voodoo Chile - Slight Return

== See also ==
- Monterey Pop Festival
- Woodstock Festival
- List of music festivals in the United States
- List of pop music festivals
- List of historic rock festivals
