= Stanley Mouse =

American artist (born 1940)

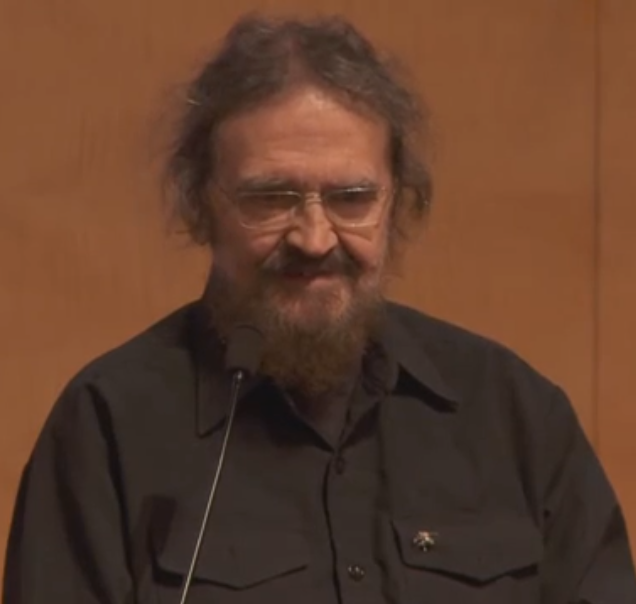
- In a discussion at the San Francisco Public Library in 2016
- Born: Stanley George Miller; October 10, 1940 (age 85); Fresno, California, US
- Education: Detroit Society of Arts and Crafts
- Occupation: Artist

Stanley George Miller (born October 10, 1940), better known as Mouse or Stanley Mouse, is an American artist who is notable for his 1960s psychedelic rock concert poster designs and album covers for the Grateful Dead, Journey, and other bands.

== Early life and education ==
Mouse was born in Fresno, California on October 10, 1940, He grew up in Detroit, where he was given the nickname Mouse in grade school. In 1956, he was expelled from Mackenzie High School for mischievously repainting the façade at The Box, a restaurant across the street from the school. He spent his junior year at nearby Cooley High School, and completed his education at Detroit Society of Arts and Crafts, which is now the College for Creative Studies.

== Career ==
By 1958, Mouse was fascinated with the weirdo hot rod art movement that was founded a decade earlier in California. Having developed skills using an airbrush, he began painting T-shirts at custom car shows, where he met and then worked with Ed Roth, the leading exponent of Weirdo Hot Rod art.

In 1959, Mouse and his family founded Mouse Studios, a mail-order company, which sold his products.

In 1964, he was invited to help in the design of Monogram automobile model kits using the "monster" cartoon characters he had developed to compete with Roth's "Rat Fink" character.

In 1965, Mouse travelled to San Francisco with a group of art school friends. Settling initially in Oakland, Mouse met Alton Kelley, a self-taught artist who recently arrived from Virginia City, Nevada, where he joined a group of hippies who called themselves the Red Dog Saloon gang. Upon arrival in San Francisco, Kelley and other veterans of the gang renamed themselves The Family Dog, and began producing rock music dances.

In 1966 and 1967, Mouse and Alton Kelley lived and worked from 715 Ashbury across the street from 710 Ashbury, where members of The Grateful Dead resided.

In 1966, when Chet Helms assumed leadership of the group and began promoting the dances at the Avalon Ballroom, Mouse and Kelley began working together to produce posters for the events. The pair also later produced posters for promoter Bill Graham and for other events in the psychedelic community. From September 1967 to December 1967, Mouse and Kelley created psychedelic posters for shows at Helms' The Family Dog Denver.

In 1967, Mouse collaborated with artists Kelley, Rick Griffin, Victor Moscoso and Wes Wilson to create the Berkeley Bonaparte Distribution Agency.

Mouse and Kelley also worked together as lead artists at Kelley Mouse studios producing album cover art for the bands Journey and Grateful Dead. The Monster Company founded in 1971 also developed a profitable line of T-shirts, utilizing the four color process for silk screening.

The psychedelic posters Mouse and Kelley produced were heavily influenced by Art Nouveau graphics, particularly the works of Alphonse Mucha and Edmund Joseph Sullivan. Material associated with psychedelics, such as Zig-Zag rolling papers, were also referenced. Producing posters advertising for such musical groups as Big Brother and the Holding Company, Quicksilver Messenger Service, and Grateful Dead led to meeting the musicians and making contacts that were later to prove fruitful.

In 1969 Stanley was commissioned to paint Eric Clapton's car in London. After brief periods in London and Massachusetts, he moved to Toronto where he ran a Yorkville waterbed store called The Waterbed Gallery, whose walls featured his artwork.

In 1971, Mouse returned to California, living near Kelley in Marin County, and the pair resumed their partnership, producing commercial artwork related to the Grateful Dead and later Journey. The pair are credited with creating the skeleton and roses image that became the Grateful Dead's archetypal iconography, and Journey's wings and beetles that appeared on their album covers from 1977 to 1980.

In 1977, Mouse, with Kelley, created the Styx album cover for The Grand Illusion, featuring a pastiche of René Magritte. Mouse and Kelley continued to work together on rock memorabilia until 1980.

In the early 1980s, Mouse moved to New Mexico, where he began producing fine art in a variety of media. In 1999, he contributed a portrait of Skip Spence to the tribute album, More Oar: A Tribute to the Skip Spence Album, being a collection of cover versions of songs by the co-founder of Moby Grape performed by such artists as Beck, Tom Waits and Robert Plant.

In 2002, Mouse filed a lawsuit against the producers of the film Monsters, Inc., alleging that the characters of Mike and Sulley were based on his drawings of Excuse My Dust, which he unsuccessfully pitched to Hollywood producers in 1998. A Disney spokeswoman responded that the characters in Monsters, Inc were "developed independently by the Pixar and Walt Disney Pictures creative teams, and do not infringe on anyone's copyrights".

== Bibliography ==
- Mouse, Stanley; Alton Kelley; Walter Madeiros (1992). Freehand: The Art of Stanley Mouse. Snow Lion Graphics/SLG Books. ISBN 0-943389-12-7.
- Mouse, Stanley; Jackson, Blair (2015). California Dreams: The Art of Stanley Mouse. Soft Skull Press. ISBN 978-1-59376-546-0.
