= Chet Helms =

American music promoter (1942–2005)

- Born: Chester Leo Helms; August 2, 1942; Santa Maria, California, U.S.
- Died: June 25, 2005 (aged 62); San Francisco, California, U.S.
- Occupation: Music promoter
- Known for: Often called the father of the "Summer of Love"

Chester Leo "Chet" Helms (August 2, 1942 – June 25, 2005), often called the father of San Francisco's 1967 "Summer of Love," was a music promoter and a counterculture figure in San Francisco during its hippie period in the mid- to-late 1960s.

Helms was the founder and manager of Big Brother and the Holding Company and recruited Janis Joplin as its lead singer. He was a producer and organizer, helping to stage free concerts and other cultural events at Golden Gate Park, the backdrop of San Francisco's Summer of Love in 1967, as well as at other venues, including the Avalon Ballroom.

He was the first producer of psychedelic light-show concerts at the Fillmore and the Avalon Ballroom and was instrumental in helping to develop bands that had the distinctive San Francisco Sound. Helms died June 25, 2005, of complications of a stroke. He was 62.

== Childhood ==
Chester Leo Helms was born in Santa Maria, California, the eldest of three sons. His parents were Chester and Novella Helms. Helms' father, a manager at a local sugar beet mill, died when his oldest child was nine. Chet's mother, Novella, took the boys and their terminally ill father to Texas where her family, the Dearmore family resided. After Chet's father died his mother studied to become a school teacher and took the boys to the Ozarks in southwest Missouri and taught school in a two-room schoolhouse. She taught four grades in one room and the other four grades were taught by another teacher in the other room.

Helms spent the rest of his youth in Missouri and Texas, where he learned to organize events by helping to stage benefits for civil-rights groups. He enrolled at the University of Texas and became part of the music scene there, a scene that included a very young and inexperienced Janis Joplin. Soon he dropped out of school and, inspired by the Beat Generation writers, Jack Kerouac and Allen Ginsberg traveled across America in search of freedom and inspiration. He set off wearing shoulder-length hair, a beard and rimless glasses hitchhiking across the country. He ended up in San Francisco in 1962.

Later he returned to Austin with his best friend at the time, Peter Haigh, to visit his friend Janis Joplin. He thought she could make it as a singer in San Francisco. After a week of partying, they persuaded Janis to drop out of school and hitchhike back to San Francisco with them. Later he would bring her to the attention of Big Brother and the Holding Company.

== Arrival in San Francisco ==
After arriving in San Francisco in 1962, he scrounged a living in various ways, including selling marijuana, an occupation that caused him to go to a boardinghouse at 1090 Page Street. The house was in Haight-Ashbury, then a rundown, low-rent neighborhood. Having met many musicians in his trade, and appreciating the vibrant music scene in San Francisco, he instinctively recognized the need for a forum for musicians to play music together. When he saw the large basement at Page Street, he began arranging jam sessions for the local bands and musicians. Helms, an astute organizer, made those sessions popular and started charging an admission fee of 50 cents. His career as a rock concert promoter began. Big Brother and the Holding Company formed and Helms functioned as their informal manager. He teamed up Janis Joplin with Big Brother for music sessions in the Haight-Ashbury basement.

== Family Dog Productions ==
=== Founding ===
In February 1966 he formed a loose connection with Family Dog Productions at 2111 Pine Street, a hippie commune, which hosted dances and events.

Helms was the ideal person to help this group organize their presentations and he moved into the Family Dog house. Their first formal production was a concert at Longshoremen's Hall.

In February 1966, Helms formally founded Family Dog Productions to begin promoting concerts at The Fillmore Auditorium, alternating weekends with another young promoter, Bill Graham. Helms was instrumental in introducing Bill Graham to the nascent music scene in the Haight Asbury District of S.F. Helms was nurturing when Graham caught wind of the excitement Helms was creating and promoting. As the concerts became more popular, inevitable "conflicts" arose between the two promoters. Chet's style was "easy-going, mellow, soft-tempered until pushed." Graham's style was more driven. Within a few months Helms secured the permits necessary to host events at the Avalon Ballroom, an old dancehall at 1268 Sutter Street, on the corner of Sutter and Van Ness. Big Brother and the Holding Company debuted there in June 1966. Later Helms would get them the appearance that made them famous, the Monterey Pop Festival, where Albert Grossman spotted Joplin and offered her a contract.

=== Family Dog concerts ===
In the context of the Avalon's "anti-business model" and loose ambience, Helms' Family Dog held a series of concerts between April 1966 and November 1968, featuring a mix of artists, including rock, blues, soul, Indian, and rock and roll. They included:

Helms presented top blues performers including Country Joe and The Fish; Howlin' Wolf; Bo Diddley; Muddy Waters; Little Walter; Buddy Guy; Junior Wells; the Paul Butterfield Blues Band; Buddy Miles; James Cotton Blues Band; John Mayall; Big Mama Thornton; Albert Collins; Steve Miller; Son House; Mike Bloomfield; Elvin Bishop; Blues Project, with Al Kooper; John Hammond; Charlie Musselwhite; Siegel-Schwall Band; rock bands like The Doors; Buffalo Springfield; the Byrds; Bill Haley & His Comets; The Kinks;The Edwin Hawkins Singers; the Animals' Eric Burdon & War; The Mothers of Invention; Lovin' Spoonful; The Carlos Santana Blues Band; Sir Douglas Quintet; the Soul Survivors; the Fugs; Blood, Sweat & Tears; The Association; Shorty Featuring Georgie Fame; Grateful Dead; Iron Butterfly; the Youngbloods, with Jesse Colin Young; Vanilla Fudge; Steppenwolf; Poco; Love, with Arthur Lee; sarode-player and Indian music teacher, Ali Akbar Khan; Sandy Bull; Blue Cheer; the Leaves; New Riders of the Purple Sage; Barry McGuire; Flamin' Groovies; the Loading Zone; It's a Beautiful Day; Joy of Cooking; the Grass Roots; the Sons of Adam; Sons of Champlin; Captain Beefheart; the Electric Flag; Velvet Underground; Pacific Gas and Electric; Moby Grape; the Sopwith Camel; 13th Floor Elevators; The Charlatans; Allmen Joy (see Wings West Concrete Pools Perth); Mother Earth; Southern Comfort; The Ace of Cups; Tyrannosaurus Rex; Cleanliness and Godliness Skiffle Band; Flying Burrito Brothers; Congress of Love; Notes From the Underground; Chrome Circus; Initial Shock; Oxford Circle; Daily Flash; Electric Train; Sparrow; the Orchestra; Hourglass; Kaleidoscope; Mt. Rushmore; Other Half; Phoenix; Lothar & the Hand People; Commander Cody; Cleveland Wrecking Company; The Rhythm Dukes; A.B. Skhy; Frumious Bandersnatch; Eighth Penny Matter; Jimmerfield Legend; South Side Sound; Super Ball; Solid Muldoon; Box Top; and jazz artists Sun Ra and San Francisco's own John Handy; Charles Lloyd; the Jerry Hahn Brotherhood; and folksters Joan Baez; Dave Van Ronk; Jim Kweskin Jug Band; Taj Mahal; Tim Buckley and Flatt & Scruggs.

=== Family Dog speakers/Poets/Heroes of the Hour ===
Sometimes Helms cast the music promoter role aside and the Family Dog would feature speakers, including Alan Watts, Dr. Timothy Leary, Stephen Gaskin, poet Allen Ginsberg, and other counterculture gurus. Helms is linked in San Francisco lore with Bill Graham, the Diggers, Emmett Grogan, Ken Kesey, Jack Kerouac, Gary Snyder, Lawrence Ferlinghetti, Michael McClure, Neal Cassady, Kenneth Rexroth, Ralph J. Gleason, and others.

=== The Family Dog Denver ===
In 1967, Helms and budding rock promoter Barry Fey agreed to open a Family Dog Productions concert dance hall in Denver, Colorado. They called it The Family Dog Denver, and brought in acts like The Doors, the Grateful Dead, Van Morrison, Jefferson Airplane, Buffalo Springfield, Chuck Berry, and many others. The San Francisco psychedelic poster artists were commissioned by Helms to do posters for the shows. Little has been known about the venue until the 2021 release of the documentary, The Tale of the Dog, which unearthed the story through interviews with the venue staff, bands, posters artists, attendees and Denver police, detailing the full history and lasting impact of "The Dog" for the first time.

=== Artwork and posters ===
To promote their concerts in both San Francisco and Denver, Family Dog published a series of innovative psychedelic posters, handbills and other ephemera, created by a group of prominent young San Francisco artists including Wes Wilson, Alton Kelley and Stanley Mouse (Mouse Studios), Rick Griffin, Steve Renick and Victor Moscoso. Often printed using intensely colored fluorescent inks, they typically featured a mixture of found images and specially drawn artwork. The posters of Griffin, Mouse and Kelly, in particular, were known for the intricate and highly stylized hand-lettering in which the concert details were written out, which sometimes took considerable time and effort to decipher. Original Avalon posters are now collector's items. In a slide show published with the obituary at the time of Wilson's death in 2020, The New York Times included an apparent portrait watercolor of Helms—a book in the foreground has Helms' full name on it.

Helms was also involved in joint productions/promotions at the Fillmore, Longshoreman's Hall, and Haight Street's Straight Theater (not all formal Family Dog Dance-Concerts).

== Style as promoter ==
While Graham was an aggressive businessman and professional promoter, Helms presented a philosophical and intellectual business approach. He was the visionary along with Boots Houghston. He related easily to the San Francisco hippie subculture since, in essence, he was one of them. It was not the money he was after, that was the by-product of artistic talent; it was the creative unity of new emerging music sounds that enriched Helms and the community he was talking to, which spread worldwide. The San Francisco Chronicle called Helms "a towering figure in the 1960s Bay Area music scene."

Helms embraced music for music's sake and the Beat-hipster-generation-turned-hippie philosophy. While the war raged in Vietnam and the nation coped with racial clashes and assassinations, the anti-war, anti-establishment youth thrived in the throes of a social revolution. Meanwhile, Helms was cranking out bands and musicians espousing the same lifestyle as this new audience, while giving the very distinct impression that he was indifferent to money and commercial success.

His benign image could be deceptive. According to Jay Ferguson of Spirit, Graham would negotiate shrewdly and frequently offer a lower fee to a band than Helms, but when the concert was over, he would pay the band in full; Helms did not always do likewise. Some of the more serious bands (those not subsidized by trust funds) came to prefer Graham's hard-nosed, businesslike approach. Graham did covertly help Helms financially at various times during the 1970s, keeping San Francisco in the fore as the West Coast Music mecca.

The core San Francisco rock bands, Jefferson Airplane, Grateful Dead, Big Brother and the Holding Company, Country Joe and the Fish, and Quicksilver Messenger Service (including pre-Dino Valenti), would play for both Graham's concerts at the Fillmore Auditorium, and the Family Dog at Helms' Avalon dances.

Helms' shows tended to be more relaxed compared to Bill Graham Presents dances.

== Janis Joplin ==
First introduced as a new bandmember of Big Brother, she brought what the Grateful Dead, Quicksilver Messenger Service, and Big Brother did not seem at that point to have – a lead singer to match Jefferson Airplane's Marty Balin and Signe Toly Anderson.

With Joplin as the lead singer, Helms became the group's manager and introduced them on stage when they made their crucial appearance at the Monterey Pop Festival in 1967, a performance that marked Joplin's elevation to national prominence.

== Evolution ==
Bill Graham Presents shows evolved more into high-power, professional lineups of better-known headline bands that made him known as the can-do guy that he was, while Helms, although managing to produce top-flight bands, still showcased bands that tended to be hipper and local. Helms didn't seem to have the need to hire zealous uniformed security guards, so teenagers found it easier to sneak into his dances. Helms ultimately allowed free admission after midnight. The San Francisco Family Dog dances later re-emerged in a new location, the Family Dog on the Great Highway at the edge of the Western World (its exaggerated sometimes heard full title) which opened in the summer of 69. It was the former Ocean Beach Pavilion Ballroom turned slot car track that was right next door to the old skating rink and "Bull Pup Enchiladas" at Playland, Ocean Beach, at 660 The Great Highway in San Francisco's Richmond district.

In his career Helms used other locations like ventures in Denver, Portland, and joint productions/promotions at the Fillmore, Longshoreman's Hall, and Haight Street's Straight Theater (not all formal Family Dog Dance-Concerts), etc.

== Later years ==
Helms left the concert business in 1970, except for managing a few later events: Tribal Stomp at Berkeley's Greek Theater (1978), Tribal Stomp II at the Monterey County Fairgrounds (1979), a concert series at San Francisco's Maritime Hall in 1995 under the Family Dog name, and a 30th Anniversary celebration of the Summer of Love in Golden Gate Park (1997), a free event attended by 60,000 people.

Helms became an accomplished art dealer, selling American and European paintings and sculpture at his Atelier Doré art gallery on Bush Street in San Francisco, from 1980 until 2004. After suffering a mild stroke he died within days, on June 25, 2005. Helms is memorialized in a "bright niche decorated with photographs and memorabilia" at the Neptune Society Columbarium.

== Fundraiser and tribute concert ==
On July 24, 2005, a fundraiser and tribute concert to Chet was held at the Great American Music Hall in San Francisco. The show was organized by Dawn Holliday (Hardly Strictly Bluegrass Festival organizer), Roger McNamee (who put together a collection of posters from major bay area artists) and Pete Sears who was responsible for finding and organizing the musicians. Kathy Peck of the H.E.A.R. foundation organized the online auction. Pete Sears had been talking with Chet while he was sick in the hospital and offered to help get together a benefit to take care of some pressing bills Chet was concerned about. Chet wholeheartedly gave the benefit his blessing. The concert details were well underway and most artists in place when Chet died. They decided to carry on with the fundraiser anyway and turned the concert into a tribute to Chet. The show sold out in just a few days, leaving many lined up outside unable to get in. But the concert obtained its primary goal which was to raise funds to pay off Chet's bills...all money raised was given to Chet's brother John. The concert was highly successful and featured such artists as: T Bone Burnett, Bob Weir, Mickey Hart, David Nelson, Country Joe McDonald, Leigh Stephens, Bobby Vega, Joli Valenti & Friends, and the Flying Other Brothers.

Chet Helms Memorial – Speedway Meadows, Golden Gate Park, San Francisco, October 30, 2005

== Chet Helms Memorial ==
On October 30, 2005, San Francisco celebrated Helms' life with a free nine-hour Sunday rock concert in Golden Gate Park, named the "Tribal Stomp" attended by tens of thousands, and featuring a full lineup of bands, including the old core San Francisco rock bands, and others including: The Turtles, Canned Heat, Dan Hicks (singer), the Charlatans, Country Joe McDonald, Barry Melton, Blue Cheer, Jefferson Airplane's Paul Kantner, "It's a Beautiful Day'"s David LaFlamme, Quicksilver Gold (derived from Quicksilver Messenger Service), Lee Michaels, Lydia Pense Cold Blood, Pete Sears, Nick Gravenites (Electric Flag), Harvey Mandel, Jorge Santana, Narada Michael Walden, Merl Saunders, Moby Grape Jerry Miller, and Wavy Gravy (from Ken Kesey's "Merry Pranksters" fame).

== See also ==
- Family Dog at the Great Highway, San Francisco, CA 4/18/70
- Grateful Dead Download Series: Family Dog at the Great Highway
