= Victor Moscoso =

Spanish artist (born 1936)

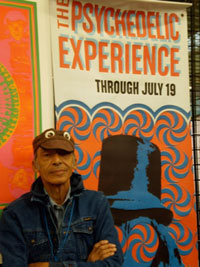
- Moscoso in front of some of his work
- Born: July 28, 1936 (age 90) Vilaboa, Galicia, Spain
- Awards: Inkpot Award, 1979; AIGA Medal, 2018

Victor Moscoso (born July 28, 1936) is a Spanish–American artist best known for producing psychedelic rock posters, advertisements, and underground comix in San Francisco during the 1960s and 1970s. He was the first of the rock poster artists of the 1960s era with formal academic training and experience. He was the first of the rock poster artists to use photographic collage in many of his posters.

== Early life and education ==
Moscoso was born in the Vilaboa parish of Culleredo, Galicia. He moved with his mother to Oleiros. His father, whose parents had already emigrated to New Jersey, was exiled to the U.S. after being persecuted by the falange. At the age of four, Moscoso and his mother, joined his father, and travelled to Brooklyn, where he stayed until he was an adult. His father worked as a painter and taught him about color combination. His mother was a seamstress

After studying art at Cooper Union in New York City and at Yale University, Moscoso moved to San Francisco in 1959. There, he attended the San Francisco Art Institute, where he eventually became an instructor.

== Career ==
Moscoso's use of vibrating colors was influenced by painter Josef Albers, one of his teachers at Yale.

Professional success came in the form of the psychedelic rock and roll poster art created for San Francisco and Denver’s dance halls and clubs. Moscoso's posters for the Family Dog dance-concerts at the Avalon Ballroom and his Neon Rose posters for the Matrix resulted in international attention during the 1967 Summer of Love. From September to December 1967, his psychedelic posters done for Chet Helms’ Family Dog Denver further extended his accomplishments and recognition. Moscoso's poster work includes album covers for musicians such as Jerry Garcia, Bob Weir, Herbie Hancock, Jed Davis, and David Grisman.

By 1968, Moscoso was doing work for underground comix, for such titles as Yellow Dog, Jiz Comics, Snatch Comics, El Perfecto Comics, and Zap Comix. As one of the Zap artists, his psychedelic work once again received international attention. His comics appeared in every issue of Zap from 1968 until the title's final issue in 2014; he also illustrated the covers for Zap #s 4, 10, and 13. Moscoso's comix work is notable for its repetitive framing and reliance on an eight-panel grid. The subjects of his comics in Zap are often classic characters like Mickey Mouse, Donald Duck, Krazy Kat, Mr. Peanut, Bugs Bunny and Winsor McCay's Little Nemo.

In 1977, Moscoso designed radio station KMEL's mascot: a camel wearing headphones. (The station used the KMEL call letters to name itself "Kamel 106".)

Moscoso has also created art for use on T-shirts, billboards and animated commercials for radio stations, for which he received two Clio awards. In addition, he was given an Inkpot Award in 1979. Moscoso was a 2018 AIGA Medalist.

In 1979, the French publisher Futuropolis published Moscoso Comix #1, a 52-page collection (which was republished in English 1989). Sex, Rock 'N' Roll, & Optical Illusions, a comprehensive collection of Moscoso's poster and comics work, was published by Fantagraphics in 2006, featuring introductions by Steven Heller and Milton Glaser.

== Personal life ==
Moscoso returned to Galicia for the first time in 1965, at age 29. In 2016, he described the visit as "Travelling a 100 years back in time. I could visit my grandparents who were, at the time, very old." Even though he returned sporadically after that, he showed little interest in visiting again, as the last time he did so was in 2001. As of 2021, Moscoso still lives in the San Francisco Bay Area.

== Exhibitions ==
- 1987 (Summer): "Zap Comix #12," Psychedelic Solution Gallery (New York City) — along with the Zap Comix collective
- 2011 (May 12–June 25) "Zap: Masters of Psychedelic Art, 1965-74," Andrew Edlin Gallery (New York City) — along with the Zap collective
- 2016 (March 2–May 7): "The ZAP Show: A Cultural Revolution," Society of Illustrators (New York City) — along with the Zap collective; curated by Monte Beauchamp
- 2023 (December 7-February 22): Moscoso Cosmos: The Visual Universe of Victor Moscoso Instituto Cervantes (New York City); curated by graphic designer David Carballal
- 2024 (March 15-July 15): Moscoso Cosmos: The Visual Universe of Victor Moscoso Instituto Cervantes (Chicago); curated by David Carballal

== Publications ==
=== Album covers ===
- Manfred Mann, The Mighty Quinn (1968)
- Steve Miller Band, Children of the Future (1968)
- Colours, Atmosphere (1969)
- Steve Cropper, With a Little Help from My Friends (1969)
- Herbie Hancock, Head Hunters (1973)
- Jerry Garcia, Garcia (1974)
- Bob Weir, Bobby and the Midnites (1981)
- Jerry Garcia, Run for the Roses (1982)
- David Grisman, Acousticity (1984)
- D.J. Burns, Backseat Lovin' (1991)
- Willie McBlind, Find My Way Back Home (2009)
- Jed Davis, The Cutting Room Floor (2010)

=== Comics ===
==== Solo titles ====
- Color (Cosmic Comics) (Print Mint, 1971)
- Moscoso Comix #1 (Futuropolis, 1979) — 52 pages, including "KSAN Comics," a 9-page story from 1971 that was originally displayed inside San Francisco MUNI buses in a partnership with KSAN (FM). "KSAN Comics" was designed as a loop that can be read at any point in the story. The twenty-three panels are all numbered on the lower left side. Moscoso Comix was later republished by Electric City Comix in 1989.

==== Contributor ====
- Yellow Dog #2 (The Print Mint, [June] 1968) — 2 stories for 2 total pages
- Zap Comix #2 (Apex Novelties, [July] 1968) — 6 stories for 8 total pages
- Yellow Dog #7 (The Print Mint, Dec. 1968) — 1-page story
- Jiz Comics (Apex Novelties, 1969) — 1-page story
- Radical America Komiks vol. 3, #1 (Students for a Democratic Society, 1969) — 2 stories for 2 total pages
- Snatch Comics #2 (Apex Novelties, Jan. 1969) — 1-page story
- Zap Comix #3 (The Print Mint, 1969) — 2 stories for 8 total pages
- Snatch Comics #3 (Apex Novelties, Aug. 1969) — 1 2-page story
- Zap Comix #4 (The Print Mint, 1969) — 2 stories
- Zap Comix #5 (The Print Mint, 1970) — 1 6-page story ("Krazy Komix")
- West Magazine (1971) — 1-page story ("Spiro's Trip to Mars"); also published as a postcard
- The Rip Off Review of Western Culture #1 (Rip Off Press, June/July 1972)
- West Magazine (c. 1972) — 1-page collaboration with Robt. Williams ("Howdy Aliens!")
- El Perfecto Comics (The Print Mint, 1973) — 2 stories for a total of 4 pages
- Zap Comix #6 (The Print Mint, 1973) — 1 6-page story ("Loop De Loop De")
- Tales from the Berkeley-Con vol. 2, #2 (Rip Off Press/Last Gasp, 1974) — 1-page story
- Zam-Zap Jam (The Print Mint, 1974) — 2 jams with Robert Crumb ("Abracadabra" and "A Bug Story") for a total of 9 pages
- Zap Comix #7 (The Print Mint, 1974) — 1 6-page story ("[Changes]") and a back cover
- Arcade #1 (The Print Mint, Spring 1975) — 1-page story ("Mystic Comics Part 1")
- Zap Comix #8 (The Print Mint, 1975) — 2 stories ("Rumpelstiltskin" and "Dinosaur Fight") for a total of 4 pages
- Zap Comix #9 (The Print Mint, 1978) — 2 stories for a total of 5 pages
- Zap Comix #10 (Last Gasp, 1982) — 1 9-page story ("The Oasis") and the front cover
- Zap Comix #11 (Last Gap, Feb. 1985) — contribution to one 1-page group jam
- Zap Comix #12 (Last Gasp, 1989) — 1 7-page story ("The Artist and the Elves")
- Zap Comix #13 (Last Gasp, 1994) — 8 stories for a total of 12 pages
- Zap Comix #14 (Last Gasp, 1998) — 8 stories for a total of 16 pages, including 3 "Blobman Comics" (Nos. 10, 11, and 12) and a 2-page collaboration with Spain Rodriguez ("Incident at Zwigoff's")
- Zap Comix #15 (Last Gasp, 2005) — 3 stories for a total of 7 pages, including a Blobman comic

== See also ==
- Robert Crumb
- Rick Griffin
- Alton Kelley
- Stanley Mouse
- Wes Wilson
