= Alton Kelley =

American artist (1940–2008)

- Born: Alton Kelly; June 17, 1940; Houlton, Maine
- Died: June 1, 2008 (aged 67); Petaluma, California
- Known for: concert posters, logos, album covers, fine art
- Movement: Psychedelic art

Alton Kelley (June 17, 1940 – June 1, 2008) was an American artist known for his psychedelic art, in particular his designs for 1960s rock concert posters and album covers. Along with artists Rick Griffin, Stanley Mouse, Victor Moscoso and Wes Wilson, Kelley founded the Berkeley Bonaparte distribution agency in order to produce and sell psychedelic poster art.

Along with fellow artist Stanley Mouse, Kelley is credited with creating the wings and beetles on all Journey album covers as well as the skull and roses image for the Grateful Dead. Kelley's artwork on the 1971 self-titled live album, Grateful Dead, incorporated a black and white illustration of a skeleton by Edmund Sullivan, which originally appeared in a 19th-century edition of the Rubáiyát of Omar Khayyám.

In 1995, Kelley designed and printed a limited edition poster of Jack Kerouac to raise money for the Jan Kerouac Benefit Fund. Kelley is also credited for the cover art for the King's X album Ear Candy in 1996.

He was brought up in Connecticut and worked as a welder there. In 1966-1967, Kelley had his studio at 715 Ashbury (across the street from 'the Grateful Dead house') along with Stanley Mouse, Rick Griffin, and Victor Moscoso.

He died on June 1, 2008, at the age of 67, after a long illness.

== See also ==
- Robert Crumb
- S. Clay Wilson
