= Barry Fey =

American rock promoter

- Born: 1938
- Died: April 28, 2013 (aged 74–75)
- Spouse(s): Cynthia Rittenberg (m. 1966 – d. 1979); Lisa Loving (m. 1989 – d.2006)
- Children: Alan, Geoffry, Jeremy, Tyler
- Parent(s): Hetty and Albert
- Website: www.officialbarryfey.com

Barry Fey (1938 – April 28, 2013) was an American rock concert promoter from Colorado who was best known for bringing prominent music acts to the United States for the first time.

== Early life ==
Barry Fey was born on December 15, 1938 in New York City to Jewish parents and grew up in Nyack and Yonkers until the spring of 1951, when the Fey family moved to Chicago where he grew up in the southwest side of the city.

== Music career ==
Barry Fey's first concert was Baby Huey and the Babysitters in 1965 at the American Legion Hall in Rockford that made only $92. He went on to promote more shows at his college including The Byrds on July 10, 1965, at the Rockford College Gym in Illinois.

In 1966, Fey booked The Association at the University of Denver, CU Boulder, and the University of Montana which would go on to start Fey's reign in the midwest.

Fey partnered with Chet Helms to open a famed Family Dog venue in Denver in 1967. The first Family Dog show in Denver was Big Brother and the Holding Company with Blue Cheer September 8, 1967.

On September 24, 1967, Fey promoted the "Love In" concert at City Park in Denver with the Grateful Dead. 30,000 fans packed the park, including Timothy Leary, Ken Kesey, Owsley Stanley, Tim Scully and the rest of the "Merry Pranksters" on the Furthur bus. The show gave Denver a firsthand look into the "psychedelic era" of the 1960s.

Fey booked Jim Morrison and The Doors in October 1967 which would mark the first shows The Doors played outside the state of California. The Denver radio Station KIMN advertised The Doors shows as "Feline, Inc" but mispronounced it and promoted it as "Feyline presents The Doors" which is how Fey's company Feyline was born.

Some of the acts Fey booked at The Family Dog included: The Grateful Dead, Jimi Hendrix, Cream, Janis Joplin & Big Brother and the Holding Company, Blue Cheer, Quicksilver Messenger Service, Buffalo Springfield, Van Morrison, Canned Heat, The Jefferson Airplane, Chuck Berry, Tommy Bolin, Frank Zappa and the Mothers of Invention and more.

On February 14, 1968, Fey had Jimi Hendrix play at Regis College Field House in Denver. There were 4,700 tickets sold at $3.00 each. After the show Hendrix went to The Family Dog and jammed with a 16-year-old Tommy Bolin.

On September 1, 1968, Jimi Hendrix Experience, Vanilla Fudge, The Soft Machine and Heir Apparent headlined Red Rocks Amphitheatre in Morrison, Colorado. The show sold out for $5.00 a ticket. This was the very first of hundreds of Red Rocks shows Feyline would promote at the historic venue. After the concert Fey and Hendrix went back to the Cosmopolitan Hotel in Denver. In Hendrix's hotel room he would end up writing the lyrics to "Electric Lady-Land" which eventually went double platinum.

On December 26, 1968, Fey promoted the first Led Zeppelin show in North America, which took place at the Denver Auditorium.

On June 28, 29 and 30, 1969, Feyline presented the Denver Pop Festival at Mile High Stadium, which featured the final performance of The Jimi Hendrix Experience along with Frank Zappa, Creedence Clearwater Revival, Iron Butterfly, Joe Cocker, Zephyr and many others. 62,000 people were in attendance over the 3 days.

On November 7, 1969, Barry Fey promoted The Rolling Stones at Colorado State University's Moby Arena.

In the mid 1970s Fey was a partner in the Ebbets Field Rock Club in Denver, CO.

Feyline promoted George Harrison and Ravi Shankar at the Denver Coliseum in 1974.

In 1976, Fey's company Feyline started his Summer of Stars concert series at Red Rocks Amphitheatre.

For three consecutive years (1978, 1979, 1980), Fey was voted promoter of the year by Billboard magazine.

Feyline worked with the University of Southern Colorado (now Colorado State University Pueblo) to bring Van Halen to the campus in 1980, setting in motion events that would lead to the famed incident in which the band damaged the facility after discovering brown M&M's when they specifically requested none in their contract rider (given the heavy equipment used in their shows, the demand was to ensure the venue had read the contract).

In 1983, Fey, Chris Blackwell, and U2 produced the U2 Live at Red Rocks: Under a Blood Red Sky concert film.

In 1997, Fey was voted into the Touring Hall of Fame by Performance magazine.

Beyond his work in concert promotion, Fey has been credited with saving the bankrupt Denver Symphony and forming the Colorado Symphony Orchestra. He put them on a pay as you go basis, which allowed the symphony to thrive. When the historic Paramount Theater in downtown Denver was facing destruction, Fey stepped in, and signed a ten-year contract to preserve the building.

In 1991, Fey merged with Universal Concerts, which later bought him out in 1997, after a 30-year career. In an interview with Image magazine they called Fey, "Not only the best promoter in the land, but "A National Treasure."

Feyline promoted Paul McCartney at Folsom Field in Boulder, Colorado May 26, 1993.

President Bill Clinton videotaped a message of thanks and congratulations upon Fey's retirement in 1997.

Fey came out of retirement to work alongside executives at House Of Blue Concerts from 2001-2004 before retiring for a final time.

In 2009, Fey began his own radio show called "Behind the Scenes with Barry Fey" on Mile High Sports Radio, 1510 AM that discussed the music business and sports with callers.

On January 1, 2010, his official website titled the "Rockfather" was launched, where he announced that he would be teaching a class "Real History of Rock-n-Roll" at the University of Colorado beginning in February and doing speaking engagements worldwide. He also announced that he was in negotiations to write a tell-all book about the music business.

On November 1, 2011, Fey announced the completion of his book "Backstage Past" with forewords written by Ozzy Osbourne, Sharon Osbourne, and Pete Townshend.

== Life outside of music ==
In 1983, Fey cleared the path for Major League Baseball in Denver by teaming up with some of his idols Joe DiMaggio, Mickey Mantle, Willie Mays to produce an old timers baseball game.

In 1998 Fey's love of horse racing culminated with his horse Reraise winning the Breeder's Cup Sprint championship.

== Death ==
In spring of 2013, Fey had hip-replacement surgery and struggled afterwards. Unusually dour in the weeks before his death, of the surgery ordeal, Fey said, "They tell you it's a major surgery, but they don't tell you how hard it's going to be." With his son Geoffry taking care of him after the surgery, Fey had arranged for his other sons to also be near him. Fey committed suicide on Sunday, April 28, 2013, quite literally between a breakfast omelet order with son Geoffry and its delivery.

After his death, Fey was inducted into the Denver & Colorado Tourism Hall of Fame. It is the highest award given by Denver's travel industry, honoring outstanding individuals who have played a significant role in making Denver and Colorado world-class convention and tourism destinations.

In March 2013, the Westword published a series of tribute stories from former assistant Daniela Stolfi.

The Barry Fey Foundation was formed "to eradicate suicide in our Colorado entertainment community." The planned 30th anniversary Red Rocks showing of U2's "Under a Blood Red Sky", a foundation fundraiser in conjunction with the Denver Film Society, was cancelled so as not to compete with fundraising efforts for the devastating mid-September Colorado floods. They plan to show the film in 2014 as part of the popular Film on the Rocks series.

Fey had made a deal with a former mayor of Morrison, home of the Red Rocks Amphitheatre, to be buried at the residents-only cemetery just below his beloved Red Rocks, but the paperwork was lost and the request denied. The back-up plan was to scatter Fey's ashes at Red Rocks.
