= Lothar and the Hand People =

American psychedelic musical group

- Origin: Denver, Colorado, United States
- Genres: Psychedelic rock, psychedelic pop, space rock
- Years active: 1965–1970
- Labels: Capitol
- Past members: John Emelin; Paul Conly; Rusty Ford; Tom Flye; Kim King; Richard Willis; William Wright
- Website: www.lotharandthehandpeople.com

Lothar and the Hand People were a late-1960s American psychedelic rock band, known for their spacey music and pioneering use of the theremin and Moog modular synthesizer.

The band's unusual appellation refers to a theremin nicknamed "Lothar", with the "Hand People" being the musicians in the band, who included John Emelin (vocals), Paul Conly (keyboards, synthesizer), Rusty Ford (bass), Tom Flye (drums) and Kim King (guitar, synthesizer).

The band was notable for being "the first rockers to tour and record using synthesizers, thereby inspiring the generation of electronic music-makers who immediately followed them". Formed in Denver, Colorado, in 1965, Lothar and the Hand People relocated to New York in 1966. The band jammed with Jimi Hendrix and played gigs with groups such as the Byrds, Canned Heat, the Chambers Brothers, Grateful Dead and the Lovin' Spoonful. Lothar and the Hand People played music for Sam Shepard's play The Unseen Hand, and was the opening act at the Atlantic City Pop Festival in August 1969.

After three initial singles, Capitol Records released two albums by this short-lived band: Presenting ... Lothar and the Hand People (1968, produced by Robert Margouleff) and Space Hymn (1969, produced by Nick Venet). A Rolling Stone review written by Lenny Kaye described Lothar and the Hand People's music:

It is electronic country, a kind of good-time music played by mad dwarfs, and it is really good to listen to. There is no tension here, no jarring forces at war with each other. It may be strange that New York, the city which deifies speed and insanity, could produce this music, but it is as if Lothar and the Hand People have gone through this madness and come out on the other side, smiling.

The band's most popular recording was the title song "Space Hymn," which received significant FM radio play.

The first album featured a notable "robotic" cover of Manfred Mann's UK hit "Machines" (composed by Mort Shuman), which Capitol released as a single.

In 1997, the Chemical Brothers sampled the Lothar song "It Comes on Anyhow" in "It Doesn't Matter" on their album Dig Your Own Hole. A music video for "Space Hymn" screened in 2004 at the New York International Independent Film and Video Festival as well as at the ION International Animation, Games, and Short Film Festival in Los Angeles.

Lothar and the Hand People was the source for a Saturday Night Live skit called "Lothar of the Hill People" and a Boston-area theremin band named the Lothars.

== Discography ==
=== Studio albums ===
- Presenting ... Lothar and the Hand People (1968, Capitol Records)
- Space Hymn (1969, Capitol Records)

=== Singles ===
- "Rose Colored Glasses" (1967, Capitol Records)
- "L-O-V-E" (1967, Capitol Records)
- "Comic Strip" (1968, Capitol Records)
- "Machines" (1969, Capitol Records)
- "Midnight Ranger" (1969, Capitol Records)

=== Compilation albums ===
- This Is It, Machines (1986, See for Miles Records)
- Space Hymn (The Complete Capitol Recordings) (2003, Acadia)

=== Live albums ===
- Come Along: The Exodus 1966 (2020, BeatRocket)
- Machines: Amherst 1969 (Live) (2020, Modern Harmonic)
