= LSD art =

Art inspired by psychedelic experiences

LSD art is any art or visual displays inspired by psychedelic experiences and hallucinations known to follow the ingestion of LSD (lysergic acid diethylamide, also known colloquially as acid). Artists and scientists have been interested in the effect of LSD on drawing and painting since it first became available for legal use and general consumption.

LSD causes visual hallucinations, audiovisual synesthesia, and experiences of de-realisation. These effects provide inspiration for artists, who may illustrate their hallucinations.

== History ==
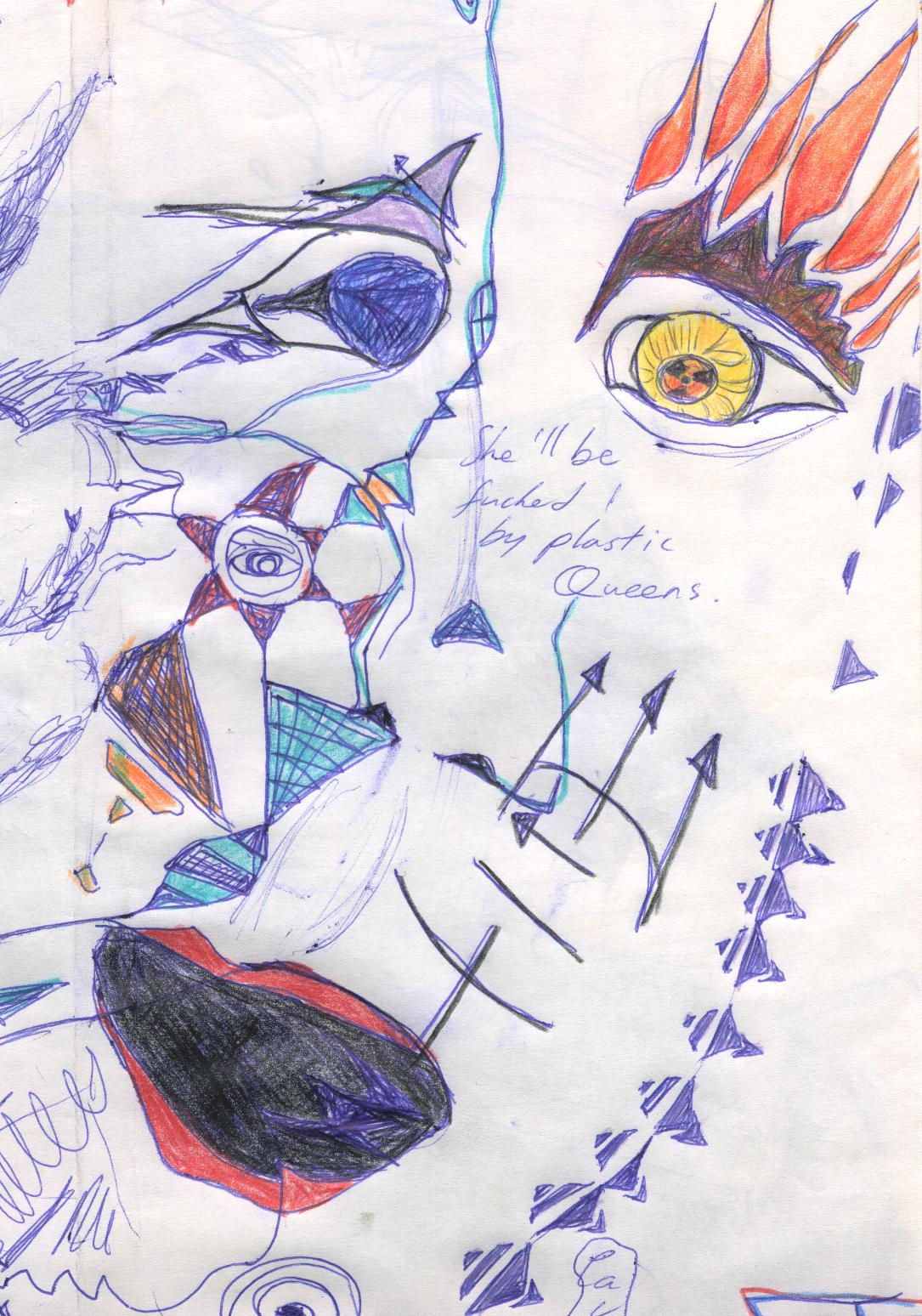
A drawing of a face, made under the effects of LSD. Dr. Oscar Janiger noted similarities between paintings made under the influence of the drug and those made by schizophrenics.

LSD art dates back to the 1960s, where it became very common as well. Some countries started banning the substance in 1968. A French artist by the name of Henri Michaux, was considered "a pioneer in psychedelic art". Michaux experimented with LSD while creating his now famous book, 'Miserable Miracle', which included both his writings and drawings. Many artists realised how LSD could also positively influence their artwork, which is why it was so popular throughout the 1960s.

Dr. Oscar Janiger was one of the pioneers in the field studying the relationship between LSD and creativity. What fascinated Janiger was that "paintings, under the influence of LSD, had some of the attributes of what looked like the work done by schizophrenics". Janiger maintained that trained artists could "maintain a certain balance, riding the edge" of the LSD induced psychosis, "ride his creative Pegasus". Janiger coined the term '"dry schizophrenia," where a person was able to control the surroundings and yet be "crazy" at the same time'.

Many artists and their surviving relatives have kept LSD artwork from this period. One patient of Dr. Janiger, bipolar and alcoholic artist Frank Murdoch, was given a controlled, experimental dose of LSD for several months as an attempt to cure his late stage alcoholism. Janiger had Murdoch paint still-lives both on and off LSD, including a Kachina doll (that he reportedly had 70 other patients also paint). Murdoch also continued to paint as an artist while on LSD, including most of his underwater paintings.

In the Netherlands, Dr. Stanislav Grof practiced psycholytic therapy in the 1980s, which included having his patients paint on LSD. Some of his artist patients painted numerous paintings while on LSD.

=== Psychedelic artists ===
- Pablo Amaringo
- Brummbaer
- Giorgio de Chirico
- Robert Crumb
- Roger Dean
- Warren Dayton
- Karl Ferris
- The Fool (design collective)
- Ernst Fuchs
- H. R. Giger
- Alex Grey
- Rick Griffin
- John Hurford
- Alton Kelley
- Mati Klarwein
- Peter Max
- Henri Michaux
- Stanley "Mouse" Miller
- Victor Moscoso
- Gilbert Shelton
- John Van Hamersveld
- Robert Venosa
- Robert Williams
- Wes Wilson

== See also ==
- Blotter art
- Hallucination
- Lysergic acid diethylamide
- Psychedelic art
- Psychedelic
- Psychedelic music
- Psychedelic literature
- Tie-dye
- Terence McKenna
- Timothy Leary
