= Holmås =

Holmås is a Norwegian surname. Notable people with the surname include:

- Heikki Holmås (born 1972), Norwegian politician
- Stig Holmås (born 1946), Norwegian librarian, poet, novelist and children's writer
