= N. West Moss =

American author

Nanette West Moss, is an American author. She is also known as N. West Moss.

Moss is the author of two books: a collection of short stories, The Subway Stops at Bryant Park Way; and a memoir, Flesh & Blood, Reflections on Infertility, Family, and Creating a Bountiful Life: A Memoir. Her work has appeared in The New York Times, McSweeney's, The Saturday Evening Post, Salon, Brevity, The Blotter, and other publications.

== Personal life ==
She is the daughter of WQXR radio personality Lloyd Moss. She was born and raised in New York and lives in New Jersey.

== Recognition ==
Moss won The Saturday Evening Post's Great American Fiction Contest, the Diana Woods Memorial Prize for Creative Nonfiction, and three Faulkner-Wisdom gold medals for essay, short story, and memoir

== Works ==
- The Subway Stops at Bryant Park. Leapfrog Press. 2017. ISBN 978-1935248910.
- Flesh & Blood: Reflections on Infertility, Family, and Creating a Bountiful Life: A Memoir. New York, NY: Algonquin Books. 2021. ISBN 978-1643750705.
