= Psychedelic Solution =

- Psychedelic Solution event in 1989
- Established: October 31, 1986
- Dissolved: December 1994 (partially) and November 2004 (fully)
- Location: 33 West 8th Street, 2nd Floor, New York, NY 10011
- Type: Art gallery and store
- Owners: Jacaeber Kastor (as well as director and curator)
- Employees: ~12 (at peak in ~1990)
- Website: psychedelicsolution.com

Psychedelic Solution was a storefront and art gallery in Greenwich Village in New York City that featured and sold psychedelic art. It was founded and run by Jacaeber Kastor. The gallery was fully open to the public and operated from October 1986 to December 1994. Subsequently, it continued to operate by appointment only for private buyers until November 2004.

At its launch, Psychedelic Solution was said to have been the first major psychedelic outpost on the East Coast of the United States in more than a decade. In addition, it was described as one of only one or two psychedelic art galleries in existence in 1991. The gallery has been referred to as "legendary" and is regarded as having had a major influence in helping to revive psychedelic art in the 1980s, which has led to its founder Kastor being described as one of the "godfathers" of psychedelic art. In addition to Psychedelic Solution's gallery exhibits, the store sold psychedelic art, including posters and postcards, which were often of well-known psychedelic rock music groups.

Psychedelic Solution exhibited work by psychedelic artists including Rick Griffin, H. R. Giger, Peter Max, Alex Grey, Allyson Grey, Stanley Mouse, Paul Mavrides, Mark Mothersbaugh, Mark McCloud, Robert Crumb, Wes Wilson, and Robert Williams, among many others. Notable visitors and clientele of Psychedelic Solution are said to have included the Grateful Dead, Iggy Pop, John McEnroe, and Whoopi Goldberg, among others. Members of the nearby Temple of the True Inner Light, a psychedelic church in the East Village who also created and distributed some amateur psychedelic art of their own, are said to have visited Psychedelic Solution as well.

A special exhibition called "Field Trip: Psychedelic Solution, 1986-1995" featuring art from Psychedelic Solution's collection was held at the 30th anniversary of New York's Outsider Art Fair in 2022. It was curated by Fred Tomaselli.

== See also ==
- Jacaeber Kastor § Psychedelic Solution
- Psychedelic Athenaeum
