= Jacaeber Kastor =

American writer

- Born: November 1955 (age 70–71)
- Occupations: Writer, artist, businessman, curator
- Years active: 1980s–present
- Known for: Psychedelic art, owner and curator of Psychedelic Solution

Jacaeber Kastor is an American writer, artist, gallery-owner, and curator of psychedelic art, best known for founding and directing the influential Psychedelic Solution gallery in New York City's West Village from 1986 to 2004. Emerging from the 1960s Bay Area counterculture, he became a leading collector, historian, and promoter of psychedelic poster art and related underground visual culture, helping connect classic San Francisco rock-poster artists with later lowbrow and pop-surrealist scenes.

== Biography ==
=== Early life ===
Kastor grew up in Berkeley, California and was exposed to the 1960s counterculture as a young man. His parents were abstract artists.

He picked up the habit of drawing from his mother, a serial doodler who covered the family desk pad with abstract drawing while talking on the phone. While working as a traffic patrol boy in 1965 he was hit by a car and seriously injured. Bedridden, he began drawing elaborate topographical landscapes with settlements. He began collecting psychedelic posters and handbills from venues in the Bay Area during the 1960s.

Before becoming a gallery owner, Kastor was a competitive skier, racing in Squaw Valley.

=== Artist ===
In 2019 his drawings were shown in a retrospective exhibit titled “The Psychedelic Sun & Other Drawings” at Brian Chambers The Chambers Project gallery in Nevada City, California.

=== Writer ===
Kastor is a contributing author of The Art of the Fillmore, a book about San Francisco rock posters. He published and contributed writing to a booklet about Stanislav Szukalski titled "Song of the Mute Singer." Between 1991 and 1995 he worked as a columnist for Wes Wilson's ‘Off the Wall’ magazine, writing about psychedelic rock concert poster art & culture. In addition to his work as author of books, he wrote editorial content as the New York correspondent for UK magazine Zigzag in 1982. In the early 2000s he became a contributing writer for Juxtapoz Magazine, and was given a credit as “Psychedelic Guru” on the masthead.

=== Films ===
Kastor has appeared in three documentary films about art: New Brow: Contemporary Underground Art (2009), Robert Williams Mr Bitchin (2010), and H R Giger Revealed (2010).

=== Psychedelic Solution ===
On Halloween of 1986, Kastor opened a gallery in New York City's West Village and named it Psychedelic Solution after liquid LSD. The opening exhibit was the work of Rick Griffin, who took up residency in the gallery. Shows of work by the other “big five” psychedelic poster designers soon followed, including Stanley Mouse, Alton Kelley, Wes Wilson, and Victor Moscoso. He also exhibited art by Juxtapoz founder Robert Williams, Wes Wilson, the Alien designer and horror artist H. R. Giger, Lee Conklin, Robert Crumb, Joe Coleman, Alex Grey, Vaughn and Mark Bode, Mark Mothersbaugh, Paul Mavrides, Spain Rodriguez, Gilbert Shelton, John Van Hamersveld, S. Clay Wilson, Jonathan Shaw, Pushead, and Axel Stocks.

A “hip, funky space,” Psychedelic Solution hosted the work of poster artists, pop-surreal / lowbrow artists, and street artists. Kastor was interested in showing unconventional but popular art. In 1990 he traveled to Tepic, Mexico to pick up artwork by Cristobal Gonzalez for his upcoming “Huichol Yarn” exhibit of paintings, and was arrested by Mexican police with Carlo McCormick, Leo and Raven Mercado, and Prem Das on charges of conspiracy to export peyote.

In 1988 he opened The Cure of Souls, “the largest display ever of LSD blotter acid sheets” from a collection owned by Mark McCloud, who had shown his collection in San Francisco as The Institute of Illegal Art. The FBI came to the gallery and asked if they could take pictures. Before opening the exhibit the art was inspected by police, to ensure that it had been “chemically neutralized.” Criticized for elevating drug paraphernalia to art, Kastor said the sheets were "cultural symbols,” and said that LSD was, “contemporary American society’s mystical outlet.”

Because much of the work shown at the gallery was related to music, exhibits were often featured on MTV news, increasing interest in the mailing list, which expanded to over fifty thousand people. Media coverage of the gallery increased dramatically.

The gallery closed in Nov 2004. Kastor was bought out, and the commercial inventory and archives were trucked away. Over 500,000 pieces of printed material and fine art were sold.

The front doors of Psychedelic Solution were covered in a collage of stickers Kastor applied for 15 years or more. They were removed and displayed at the March 2005 grand opening of The Ludlow Santo Domingo Library, Geneva, and traveled to the Rock & Roll Hall of Fame, Cleveland.

In addition to amassing an encyclopedic collection of psychedelic posters, Kastor established a poster company, Psy-Sol publishing, which printed over fifty posters for Psychedelic Solution exhibitions, and re-published some classics which had gone out of print by artists the gallery represented.
