= Brian Chambers =

Brian Chambers may refer to:

- Brian Chambers (cricketer) (born 1965), Australian born English cricketer
- Brian Chambers (footballer) (born 1949), English footballer
- Brian Chambers (curator), American curator
- Brian Geoffrey Chambers (died 1986), executed in Malaysia for drug trafficking, see Barlow and Chambers execution
