= Psychedelic animation =

The term psychedelic animation refers to animated works that mirror altered states of consciousness through techniques such as "visual patterns of hallucination, cryptic symbols, perception of cellular or atomic forms, and strange journeys or narratives."

Dr. Maureen Furniss, a historian of animation at the California Institute of the Arts, defines psychedelia as "[m]usic or visual art based on the hallucinatory experiences produced by psychedelic drugs" (446). She employs "psychedelic" as a key term on page 273 in her A New History of Animation textbook to refer to both form (e.g. the colorful and fantastical imagery of Marcell Jankovics's Son of the White Mare) and content (e.g. the visualization of "thoughts and dreams" in Sally Cruikshank's Quasi at the Quackadero).

== See also ==
- Psychedelic drug
- Psychedelia
- Psychedelic art
- Psychedelic film (includes a list of psychedelic animations)
- Psychedelic music
- Animation
- The Psychedelic Experience (1965 film)
