= Ingunn Gjerstad =

Norwegian politician (born 1963)

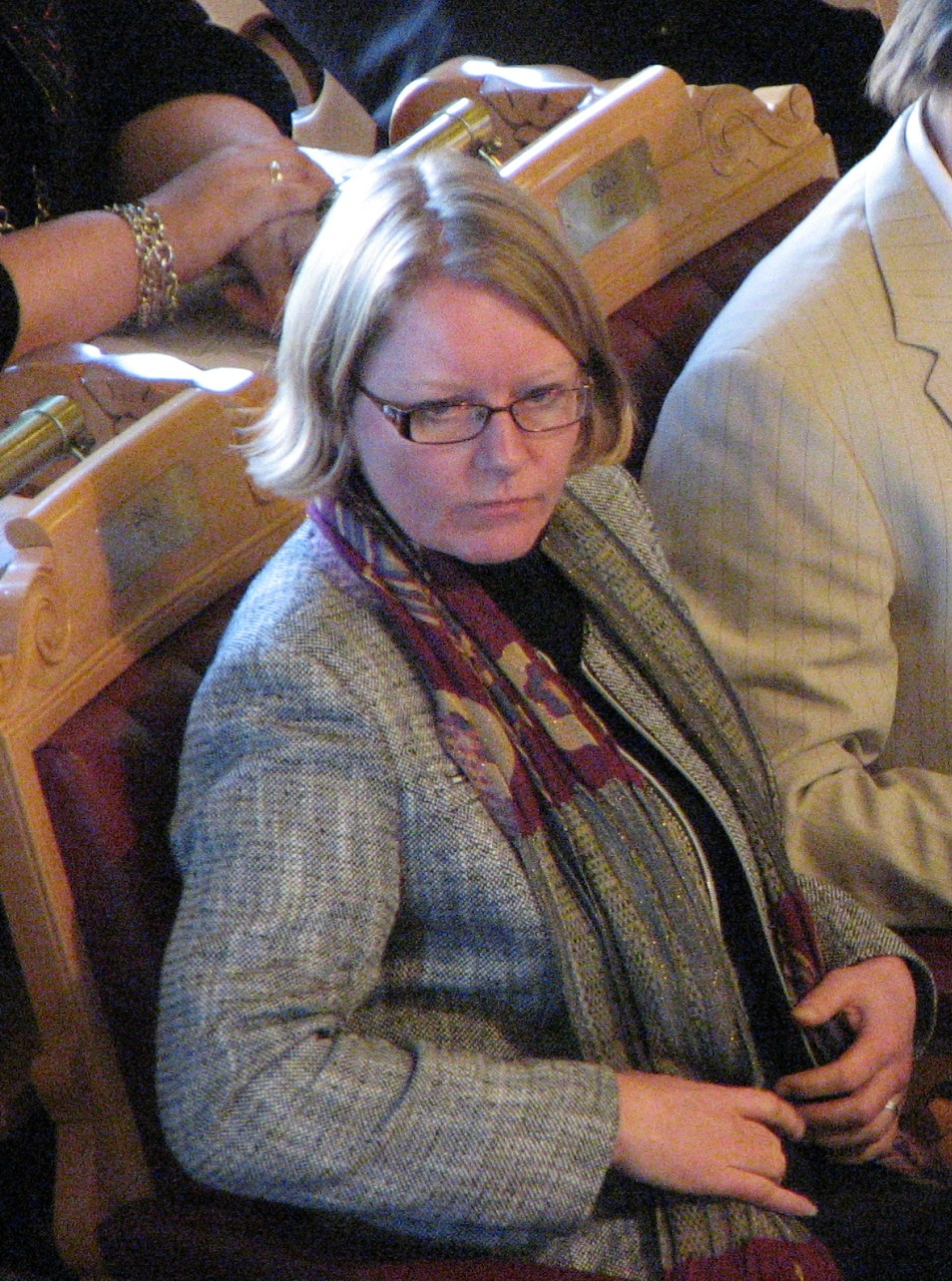
Ingunn Gjerstad

Ingunn Gjerstad (born 26 May 1963) is a Norwegian politician for the Socialist Left Party.

She served as a deputy representative to the Parliament of Norway from Oslo during the terms 2005–2009 and 2013–2017. As Heikki Holmås was a member of the outgoing Stoltenberg's Second Cabinet in 2013, Gjerstad met as a regular representative during the two weeks before the cabinet change.
