= Dennis McKenna =

American pharmacognosist and author (born 1950)

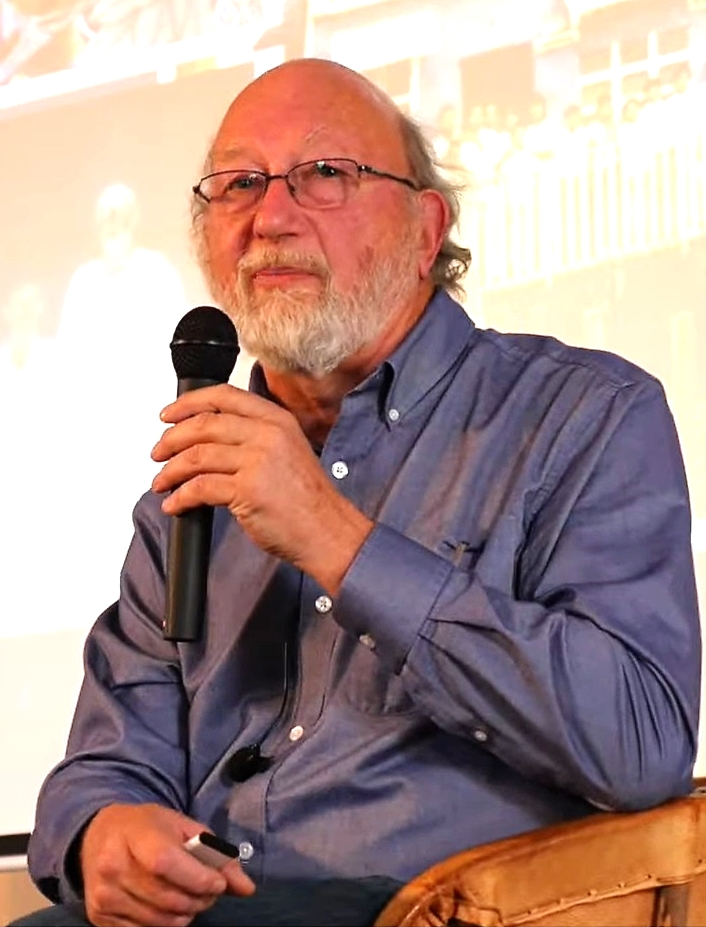
- McKenna at a Synergetic Symposium in 2021
- Born: Dennis Jon McKenna; December 17, 1950 (age 75); Paonia, Colorado, U.S.
- Occupations: Anthropologist; Ethnobotanist
- Relatives: Terence McKenna (brother)
- McKenna's voice On Ayahuasca; Recorded July 2013

Dennis Jon McKenna (born December 17, 1950, in Paonia, Colorado) is an American ethnopharmacologist, research pharmacognosist, lecturer and author. He is the brother of well-known psychedelics proponent Terence McKenna and is a founding board member and the director of ethnopharmacology at the Heffter Research Institute, a non-profit organization concerned with the investigation of the potential therapeutic uses of psychedelic medicines.

== Education ==
McKenna received his Master's degree in botany at the University of Hawaiʻi at Mānoa in 1979. He received his doctorate in botanical sciences in 1984 from the University of British Columbia, where he wrote a dissertation titled Monoamine oxidase inhibitors in Amazonian hallucinogenic plants: ethnobotanical, phytochemical, and pharmacological investigations. McKenna then received post-doctoral research fellowships in the Laboratory of Clinical Pharmacology, National Institute of Mental Health, and in the Department of Neurology, Stanford University School of Medicine.

== Career ==
McKenna's research led to the development of natural products for Aveda Corporation as well as greater awareness of natural products and medicines. He has authored numerous scientific articles and books. He co-authored The Invisible Landscape with his brother Terence and Botanical Medicines: the Desk Reference for Major Herbal Supplements with Kenneth Jones and Kerry Hughes. McKenna spent a number of years as a senior lecturer for the Center for Spirituality and Healing, part of the Academic Health Center at the University of Minnesota, Twin Cities. He became a senior research scientist for the Natural Health Products Research Group at the British Columbia Institute of Technology in the Vancouver area.

His research has included the pharmacology, botany, and chemistry of ayahuasca and oo-koo-hé, the subjects of his master's thesis. He has also conducted extensive fieldwork in the Peruvian, Colombian, and Brazilian Amazon.

== Psilocybin mushroom cultivation ==
During the early 1970s McKenna along with his brother Terence, developed a technique for cultivating psilocybin mushrooms and they published what they had learned in a book titled Psilocybin: Magic Mushroom Grower's Guide. McKenna and his brother were the first to come up with a reliable method for cultivating psilocybin mushrooms at home.

== Other ==
McKenna's memoir, The Brotherhood of the Screaming Abyss, about his and his brother Terence's life and journeys together, was published in 2012. A new edition was subsequently published in 2023 and was debuted at the Psychedelic Athenaeum in New York City.

He is featured in the documentary DMT: The Spirit Molecule.

McKenna participated in the first Evolver Convergence 2012 in Pittsburgh, June 1–4.

He has been the main guest several times on the popular radio show Coast to Coast AM. His last appearance on the show was the Sunday March 23, 2014, episode.

On December 16, 2012, April 17, 2017, and June 21, 2018, McKenna was the guest on The Joe Rogan Experience podcast.

Dennis was also a key guest on The Cosmic Echo Podcast on September 18, 2018.

== Bibliography ==
- McKenna, Dennis; McKenna, Terence (1975). The Invisible Landscape: Mind, Hallucinogens, and the I Ching. New York: Seabury. ISBN 9780816492497. Lo scenario invisibile. Mente, allucinogeni e I Ching, Rome, Italy: Spazio Interiore (2024)
- McKenna, Dennis; McKenna, Terence; under the pseudonyms OT Oss and ON Oeric (1976). Psilocybin - Magic Mushroom Grower's Guide. Berkeley, CA: And/Or Press. ISBN 9780915904136.
- The Incense Bible: Plant Scents That Transcend World Culture, Medicine, and Spirituality (2007)
- McKenna, Dennis; Jones, Kenneth; Hughes, Kerry (2008). Botanical Medicines: the Desk Reference for Major Herbal Supplements. Berkeley, CA: Routledge. ISBN 978-0789012654.
- The Brotherhood of the Screaming Abyss (2012); La confraternita dell'abisso urlante, Rome, Italy: Delufa Press (2025)
- Aya Awakenings: A Shamanic Odyssey (2013)
- Return to the Brain of Eden: Restoring the Connection between Neurochemistry and Consciousness (2014)
- McKenna, Dennis; Prance, Ghillean; Davis, Wade; Leonen, Benjamin (2018). Ethnopharmacologic Search for Psychoactive Drugs: 50 Years of Research. Synergetic Press. ISBN 978-0907791683.
