= Seed germinator =

Device that assists in germinating seeds

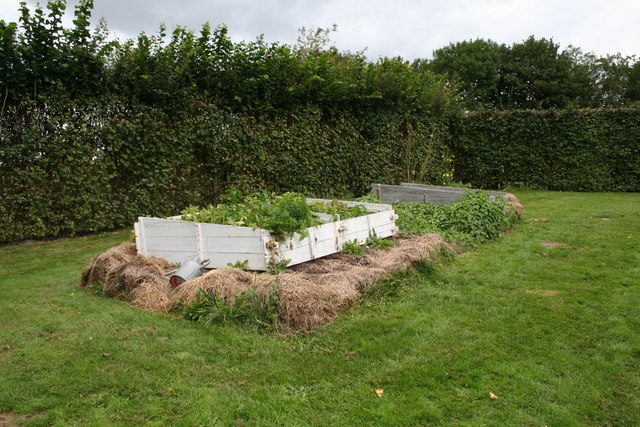
Gilbert White used hot beds warmed by manure to germinate melon seeds in England.

A seed germinator is a device for germinating seeds. Typically, these create an environment in which light, humidity and temperature are controlled to provide optimum conditions for the germination of seeds.

One type of germinator is the Copenhagen or Jacobsen tank. The seeds rest upon blotting paper which is kept moist by wicks which draw from a bath of water whose temperature is regulated. The humidity around each seed is kept high by means of glass funnels and a lid covering the tank.
