= Mari Lund Arnem =

Norwegian politician (born 1986)

Mari Lund Arnem (born 27 January 1986) is a Norwegian politician for the Socialist Left Party.

She served as a deputy representative to the Parliament of Norway from Oslo during the term 2009–2013. From March to April 2012 she served as a full member of Parliament, covering for cabinet minister Heikki Holmås between two cabinet reshuffles.
