= Psychedelic Athenaeum =

Psychedelic center

Coordinates: 40°45′10″N 73°58′18″W

- Formation: February 2023; 3 years ago in New York City, New York
- Founders: Kathleen "Kat" Lakey, Suzy Baker, Sarah Fernandez, and Abby Lyall
- Dissolved: May 2025; 1 year ago
- Type: Psychedelic library and community center
- Location: 222 E. 46th St. New York, New York 10017
- Members: >100 in December 2023
- Parent organization: The Psychedelic Assembly
- Website: thepsychedelicassembly.com/athenaeum/

The Psychedelic Athenaeum, or Psychedelic Athenæum, was a psychedelic library and community center in Midtown Manhattan in New York City that operated in the mid-2020s. It was founded by Kathleen "Kat" Lakey, Suzy Baker, Sarah Fernandez, and Abby Lyall in February 2023. However, the center closed its doors in May 2025 after a little over 2 years of operation.

The Psychedelic Athenaeum was intended as a safe space for the psychedelic community. It was a public but member-based organization and had more than 100 members in late 2023. In addition to holding thousands of books and operating as a quiet reading and working space during the day, the center also hosted events at night and featured a café. Use, sale, or trade of psychedelics was not allowed at the location. The center was described as the world's first and only psychedelic athenaeum or library. Its parent organization was The Psychedelic Assembly.

Dennis McKenna and the new edition of his memoir the Brotherhood of the Screaming Abyss were featured at the grand opening of the center. One of the center's co-founders, Lyall, assisted in co-writing a bill to legalize adult possession of several psychedelic and related drugs in New York state.

== See also ==
- Psychedelic Solution
