= Blotting paper =

Absorbent paper

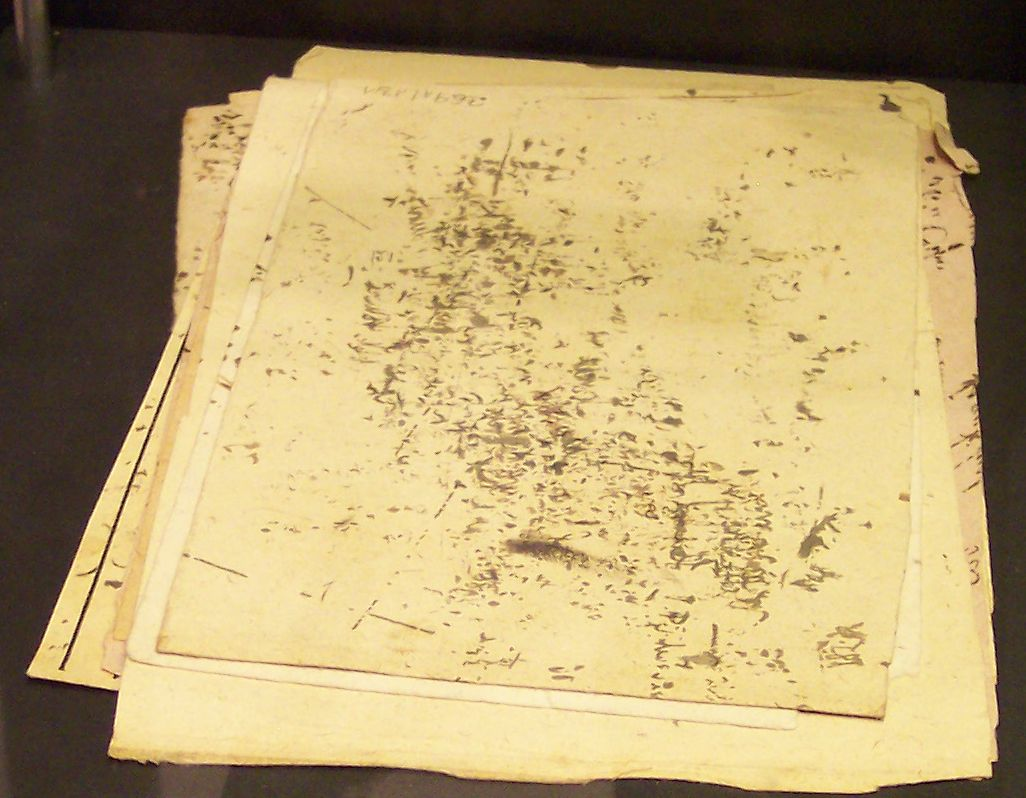
Used sheets of blotting paper, with ink stains

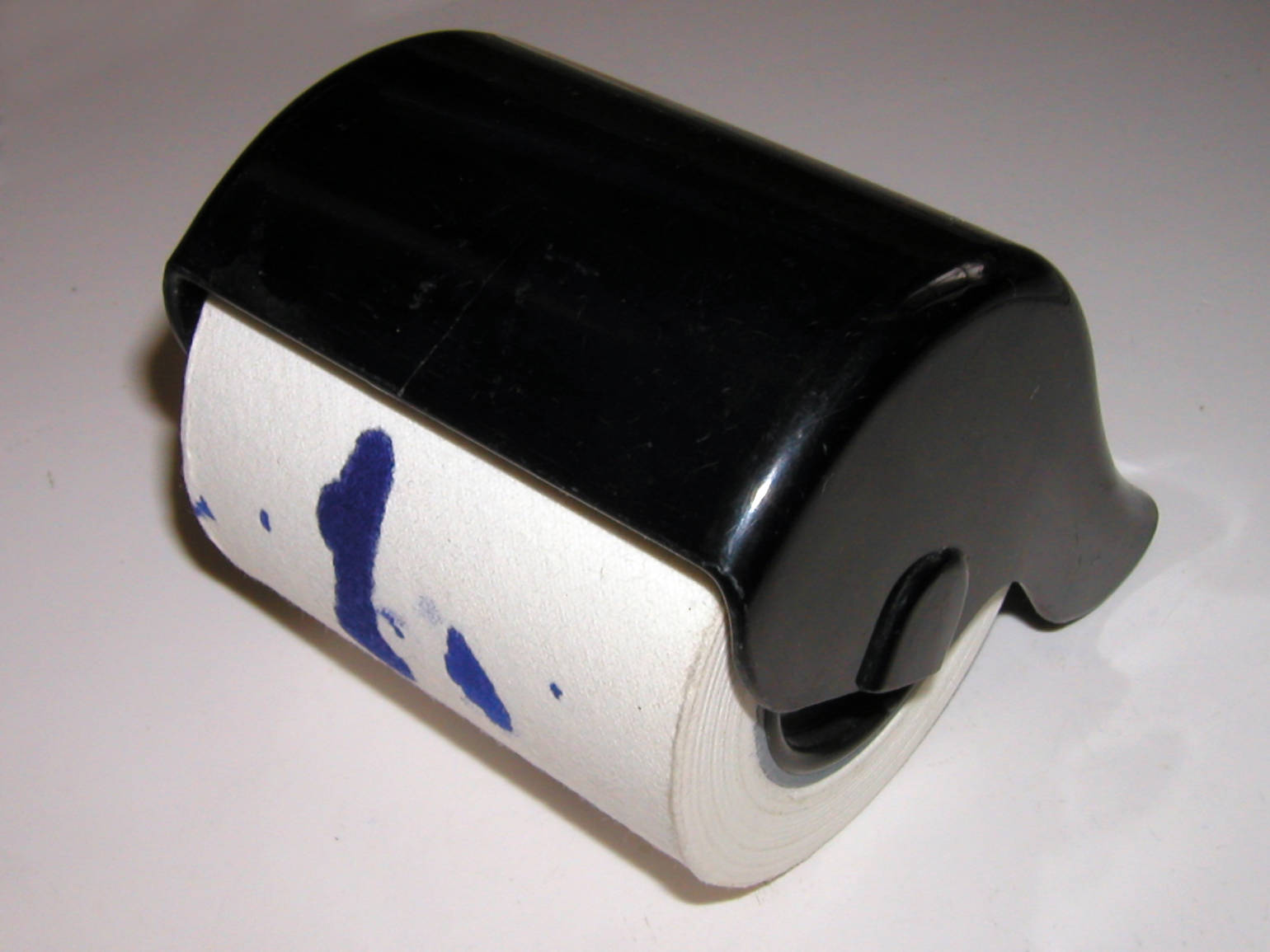
Blotting paper on a roll

Blotting paper is a highly absorbent type of paper used to absorb ink or oil from writing material, particularly when quills, dip pens, or fountain pens were popular. It could also be used in testing how much oil is present in products. Blotting paper referred to as bibulous paper is mainly used in microscopy to remove excess liquids from the slide before viewing. Blotting paper has also been sold as a cosmetic to aid in the removal of skin oils and makeup.

== Manufacture ==
Blotting paper is made from different materials of varying thickness, softness, etc. depending on the application. It is often made of cotton and manufactured on special paper machines. Blotting paper is reputed to be first referred to in the English language in the 15th century but there is a tradition in Norfolk, England that it was invented by accident at Lyng Mill on the River Wensum.

It is reported that a Berkshire (England) paper mill worker failed to add sizing to a batch of paper that was being produced. The batch was discarded. Subsequently, someone tried to write on a piece of this discarded "scrap" paper and found that it rapidly absorbed any ink applied, making it unusable for writing. Its marked absorbency having been noted, however, led to its subsequently being produced and used as blotting paper, replacing sand, which was the material that had been used for absorbing superficial wet ink. In a time when most paper was produced from "rags", red/pink rags, from which it was difficult to remove all colour and had generally been discarded, were now directed to the production of blotters, hence the historically characteristic pink colour of blotters.

== Applications ==
=== Art ===
A form of blotter paper commonly known as watercolor paper is produced for its absorbent qualities, allowing much better absorption of water and pigments than standard art or drawing papers. Although usually categorized as separate from blotting paper, differences in the constituents and thickness of blotting paper and watercolor paper are subtle, and making a distinction between the two is unnecessary as the production process is nearly identical.

=== Chemical analyses ===
Blotting paper is used in chemical analyses as stationary phase in thin-layer chromatography. Blotting paper is also used in pool/spa maintenance to measure pH balance. Small squares of blotting paper attached to disposable plastic strips are impregnated with pH sensitive compounds usually extracted from lichens, especially Roccella tinctoria. These strips are used similarly to litmus strips, however filter paper is usually used for litmus strips, generally to allow for the property of diffusion.

=== Drugs ===
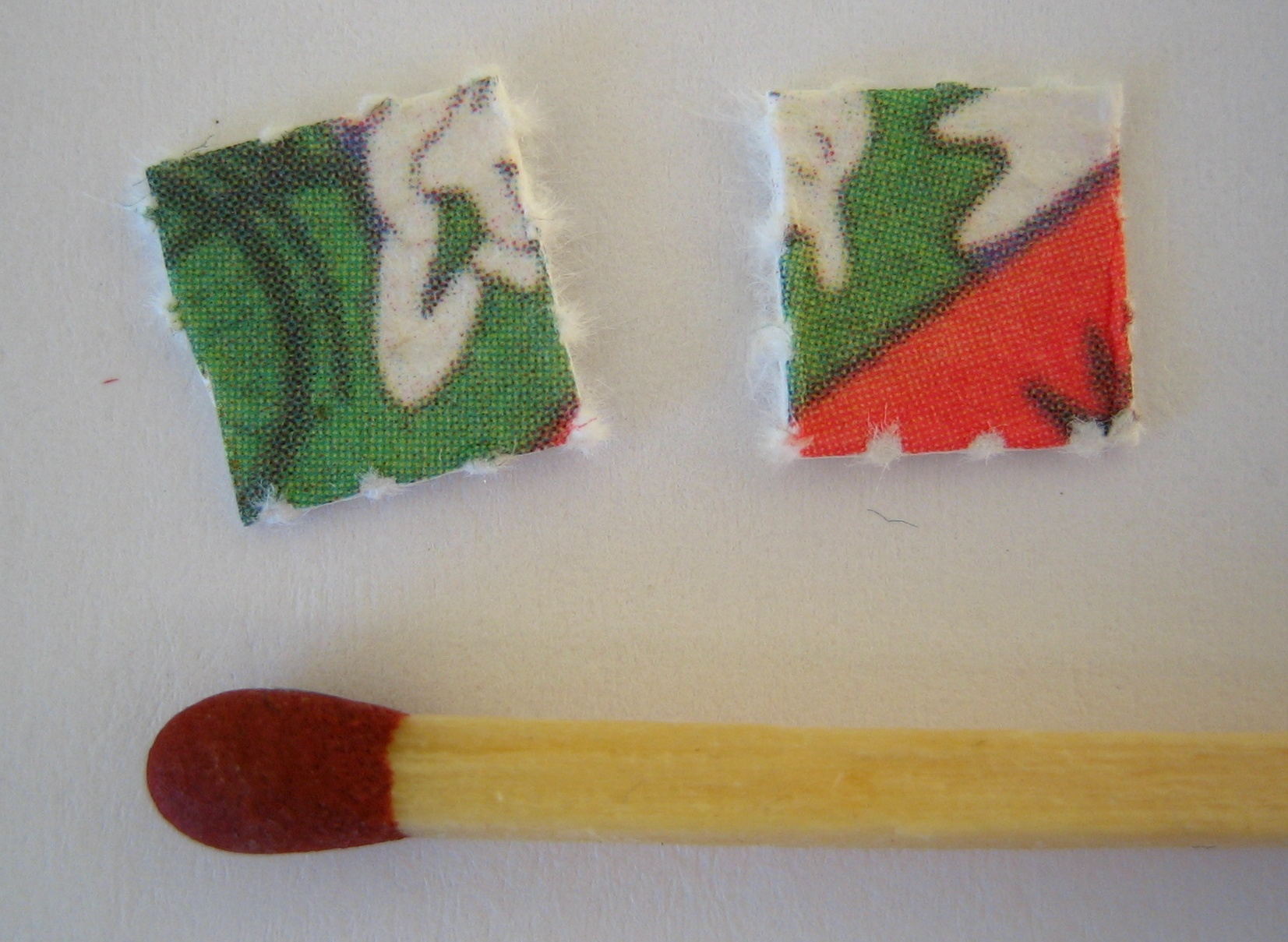
Two doses of LSD, with a match for scale

Drugs active in microgram range, most notably LSD, are commonly distributed illicitly on blotting paper. A liquid solution of the drug is applied to the blotting paper, which commonly is perforated into individual doses and artfully decorated with what is known as blotter art. Vanity blotter is blotter art that has not been exposed to LSD and is usually sold as a collectible, although inevitably much of this art ends up in illegal distribution. The artwork is printed onto blotter paper and then sometimes perforated into tiny squares or "tabs" which can be torn or cut apart. Most blotter art designs have grid lines as part of the design to either aid in perforation or to be left as a cutting grid. Blotter as a drug delivery method allows for easy dosing of potent substances, and easy sublingual administration of drugs which has made it increasingly popular as a preparation for other potent drugs, including 25I-NBOMe and alprazolam.

Plain white LSD blotter without artwork is commonly referred to as “WoW” (White on White) (Note: "White on white refers to "white fluff", a grade of supposedly high purity LSD, on white paper.) and is usually not perforated but rather gridded with a pen and sometimes laid on common watercolour paper.

=== Writing ===
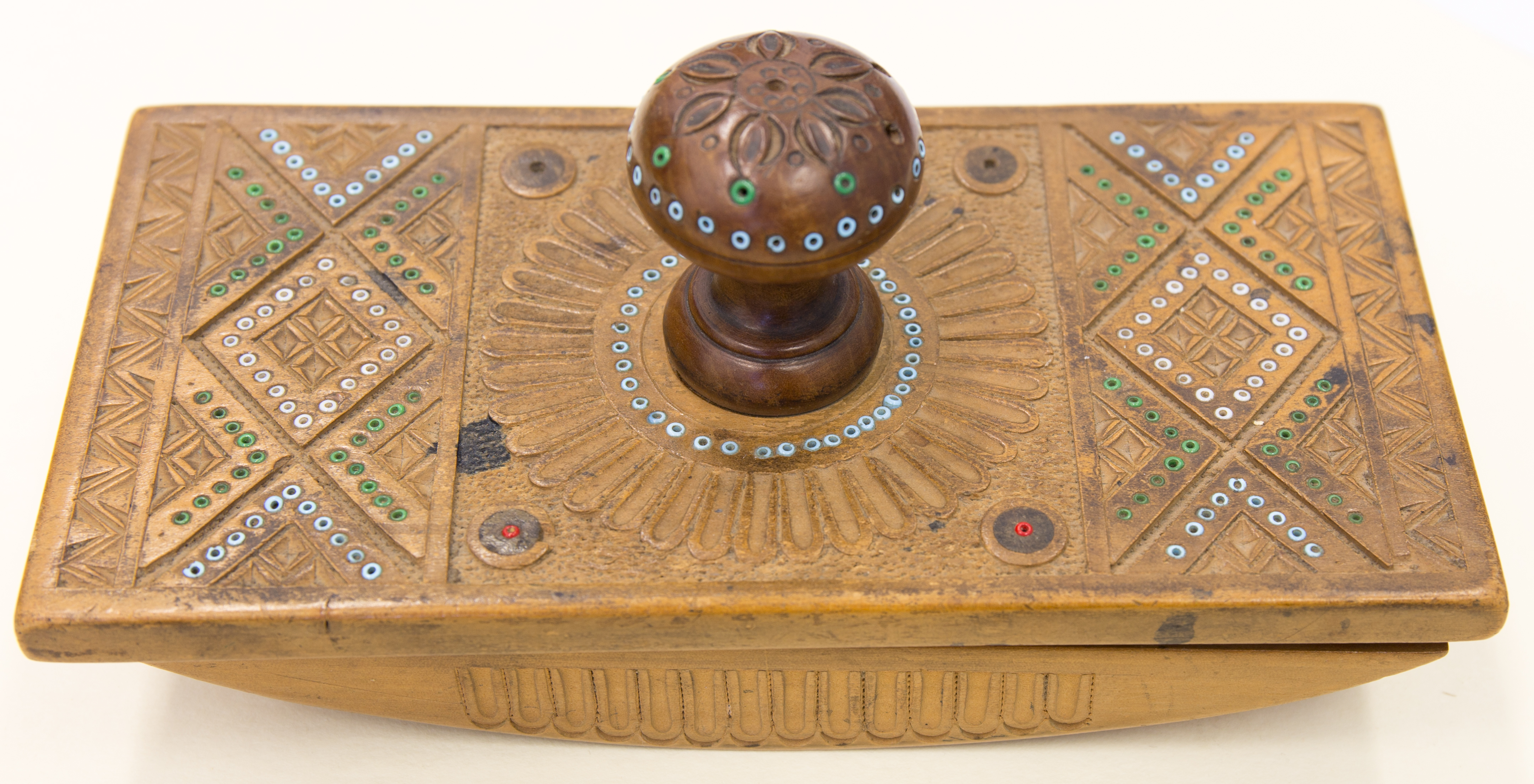
Blotting paper holder from Germany, today owned by Museum Europäischer Kulturen, Berlin, Germany

Blotting is frequently necessary when using dip pens and occasionally when using fountain pens. This was first done by sprinkling pounce over the wet ink.

When used to remove ink, the writing may appear in reverse on the surface of the blotting paper, a phenomenon which has been used as a plot device in a number of detective stories, such as in the Sherlock Holmes story "The Adventure of the Missing Three-Quarter".

=== Cosmetics ===
Blotting papers are also commonly used in cosmetics to absorb excess sebum oil from the face. They are popularly marketed and have been sold by numerous cosmetic brands worldwide.

The papers are often dyed, for wider market appeal, and dusted with salicylic acid and minerals to actively prevent the formation of comedones and acne. However, there is a popular debate of whether blotting papers can help reduce acne by absorbing excess oil, or cause it. The quality of the blotting papers and the use of other ingredients such as mineral oils may be a determining factor.

=== Ritual Magic ===
During the Renaissance in Iceland, blotting paper had a small religious significance as a tool for ceremonial magic. This becomes noticeable in the Galdrabók, a grimoire (magic spell book) of the period, in which the reader is directed to draw sigils on blotting paper to attain success.

=== Agriculture ===
Within a temperature regulated bath, seeds are rested between moisturized blotting paper as a germination device. This method is typically used in seed germinators, which create balanced conditions of humidity and temperature.

== See also ==
- Blotting paper coffee filter
- Aburatorigami
