= Brian Chambers (curator) =

American art curator and gallery owner (born 1979)

Brian Chambers is an American art curator and gallery owner specializing in psychedelic art.

Chambers was born June 22, 1979. He now lives in Grass Valley, California, and is the owner and curator of The Chambers Project, the world's premier psychedelic art gallery located in Grass Valley, California.

== Career ==
Chambers became interested in art curation in 1996 when he discovered the work of Ralph Steadman, the eccentric creator of satirical cartoons especially known for his gonzo work with Hunter Thompson, mainly the integration of art and text in Fear and Loathing in Las Vegas. Rick Griffin, the designer of Grateful Dead posters and album covers as well as psychedelic comic books of the seventies underground drug subculture, was another powerful influence.

When Chambers saw a picture of Mario Martinez’ (Mars1) painting titled "Mental and Material Realms" in Juxtapoz Magazine in 2008, he was impressed, and formed a collective psychedelic art project called Furtherrr, commissioning painters Mars-1, Oliver Vernon and Damon Soule to create a collaborative painting over three days at the Symbiosis Gathering in Yosemite in Fall of 2009. He continued organizing similar art events for the collective in Arizona. Other early influences on Chambers include the work of painter Alex Grey, known for his “psychedelic kundalini” imagery and his Chapel of Sacred Mirrors in New York. Chambers got to know Grey and, in March 2021, sold four of his paintings to a Silicon Valley programmer for $1,000,000.

== Galleries ==
His first attempt to open a gallery space was in a late 19th-century house he bought in Denver, Colorado but this effort was prevented by zoning laws, and the first Chambers Project gallery opened in Nevada City, California on July 11, 2018, with a group show of a “trippy, abstract, psychedelic oeuvre with an emphasis on collaborative explosions of color and shape.” He has exhibited work by the Australian art Leans, Miles Toland and Julian Vadas, Christian Calabro, Colin Prahl, Hollie Dilley, Justin Lovato. In summer of 2019 Chambers organized a show of line drawings by Jacaeber Kastor, a pioneering curator of psychedelic art, and former owner of the successful Psychedelic Solution gallery in New York’s West Village.

== NFT’s ==
Chambers was involved in the early production of Non-Fungible Tokens (NFTs) for artists. Among others, he produced an MPEG animation of Roger Dean’s Floating Islands, which sold for $22,222, a limited edition of 777 files of Dean’s Green Parrot Island, priced at $333 each, and an open edition of Dean’s Explore, which sold 267 pieces, priced at $999 each during the brief seven-minute window it was offered.
