= Psychedelic film =

Film genre

Psychedelic film is a film genre characterized by the influence of psychedelia and the experiences of psychedelic drugs. Psychedelic films typically contain visual distortion and experimental narratives, often emphasizing psychedelic imagery. They might reference drugs directly, or merely present a distorted reality resembling the effects of psychedelic drugs. Their experimental narratives often purposefully try to distort the viewers' understanding of reality or normality.

== Subgenres ==
- Acid Western adapts tropes of the Western genre popular in the 1960s and 1970s, augmented with psychedelic imagery or allusions.
- Psychodrama may complement dramatic elements of the film with psychedelic imagery based on psychological expansion or exploration.
- Stoner film exploits the comic potential of recreational cannabis, often punctuated with exaggerated psychedelia.

== Examples: Live Action ==
=== 1940s ===
- 1948: The Red Shoes

=== 1960s ===
- 1966: Daisies
- 1967: Point Blank
- 1968: 2001: A Space Odyssey; the Stargate sequence features slit-scan animation

=== 1970s ===
- 1970: Zabriskie Point
- 1971: The Devils
- 1972: Behind the Green Door
- 1972: The Devil
- 1973: The Wicker Man
- 1977: 3 Women
- 1977: Suspiria

=== 1990s ===
- 1995: Dead Man

=== 2000s ===
- 2000: Requiem for a Dream

=== 2010s ===
- 2013: A Field in England

=== 2020s ===
- 2020: Friend of the World

== Examples: Animation ==
=== 1960s ===
- 1968: Yellow Submarine

=== 1970s ===
- 1973: Fantastic Planet

=== 1980s ===
- 1981: Son of the White Mare

== See also ==
- Stoner film
- Surrealist cinema
- Psychedelic art
- Psychedelic Animation
- Psychedelic literature
- Psychedelic music
- List of films featuring hallucinogens
