= Boyle Family =

Scottish artist (1934–2005)

Mark Boyle (11 May 1934 – 4 May 2005) was a Scottish artist born in Glasgow and known for his work in the cultural UK Underground of the 1960s around the Traverse Theatre, and from 1985 exhibited with Joan Hills and their children Sebastian and Georgia as Boyle Family.

Boyle and Hills created multimedia works in the 1960s under the names Institute of Contemporary Archaeology and The Seminal Laboratory.

Although Boyle Family have worked across a wide range of different media (including painting, photography, sculpture, film, projection, sound recordings and drawing), they are perhaps best known for their Earth studies. These pictures – highly accurate painted casts that operate somewhere between painting and sculpture – involve the meticulous re-creation of randomly chosen areas of the Earth's surface using resin and fibreglass (as well as real materials collected from the original site) and have been exhibited internationally. Past shows have included the British Pavilion at the XXXIX Venice Biennale in 1978, the Institute of Contemporary Art, Boston in 1982, Beyond Image - Boyle Family (Hayward Gallery, London) in 1986 and Boyle Family (Scottish National Gallery of Modern Art, Edinburgh) - a major retrospective held in 2003.

In addition to developing highly original casting techniques, Mark Boyle and Joan Hills also pioneered the use of liquid light shows during the 1960s. These projections played a seminal role in the development of the counter-culture of the period. The light environments were used to accompany stage performances by such artists as Jimi Hendrix and jazz-rock pioneers Soft Machine.

Amongst others he collaborated with are George Brecht, Peter Schmidt (artist), Cornelius Cardew, and John Tilbury.
