= Warren Dayton =

American illustrator, artist and graphic designer

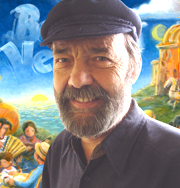

Warren Lloyd Dayton is an American illustrator, artist and graphic designer best known for his posters from psychedelic art era, a pioneer of the use of T-shirts as an art medium, creator of corporate branding & logos such as Thomas Kinkade’s Lightpost Publishing, and internationally award-winning book, editorial, commercial illustration and typography. Dayton's work ranges from funny and whimsical drawings used in many magazines and books, corporate branding and logos to illustrated features and books that have been honored by selection in design competitions and earned grants from the National Endowment for the Arts. He has authored and illustrated several books that have become collector's items; he continues to illustrate murals, posters and books. He founded Artifact, Ink studios in 2001 and currently works in the studio in the Sierra Foothills with several other artists and designers.

== Biography ==
Dayton was born March 1, 1940, in Sacramento, California, as the fourth generation of an early California pioneering art family. He won a scholarship to Chouinard Art Institute in Los Angeles in 1961 (now known as California Institute of the Arts, or CalArts) where he studied illustration and advertising design. After working in ad agencies in southern California, he began a freelance career in 1965. In 1967, Dayton pioneered reproducing wearable art on t-shirts, unique enough at the time to warrant a feature in Los Angeles Times West magazine. Upon the emergence of the Hippies and explosion of counterculture art, Dayton's posters such as “Quack” and “Now” came to be highly collected from 1967–1973 and were featured on the cover and lead article about the psychedelic art phenomenon in Life magazine. Warren Dayton's posters can be seen in films and documentaries of the hippie and Haight-Ashbury era, such as American Experience: Summer of Love (PBS Broadcasting, June 2007).

After converting to Christianity in 1974, Dayton founded Prints of Peace publishing the work of 12 Christian artists, including fellow Chouinard (CalArts) alumni and psychedelic poster artist, Rick Griffin. In 1985, Dayton moved to the Sierra’s near Placerville, California, where he currently lives and works. Warren Dayton began the design studio, ArtiFact, Ink in 2001. Recent awards include a poster chosen for the 2009 & 2008 Society of Illustrators of Los Angeles national competition Illustration West. He does work for charities, such as logos and mastheads for Focus on the Family and Habitat for Humanity, murals for an orphanage in Mexico and other worthy causes, and continues to publish limited-edition prints. His poster for the ballet Coppélia, created for Stages: Northern California Performing Arts has been selected as an example of modern poster design in the article about history of graphic design.

== Awards ==
Dayton’s work was selected many times for juried showcase awards publications, including Society of Illustrators of Los Angeles 2009 Certificate of Merit and show annual publication Illustration West (3 inclusions: 2009 certificate and gallery for "Illustration West 47", 2008 “Illustration West 46” and Illustration West 26”, see reference below), Graphis Inc. - The International Journal of Visual Communication (5 inclusions magazine and annual, 1966–1972), Communication Arts Magazine and Annual (2 times inclusion), the Los Angeles Art Director's Club Show and the New York Art Director’s Club.
