= Heikki Holmås =

Norwegian politician

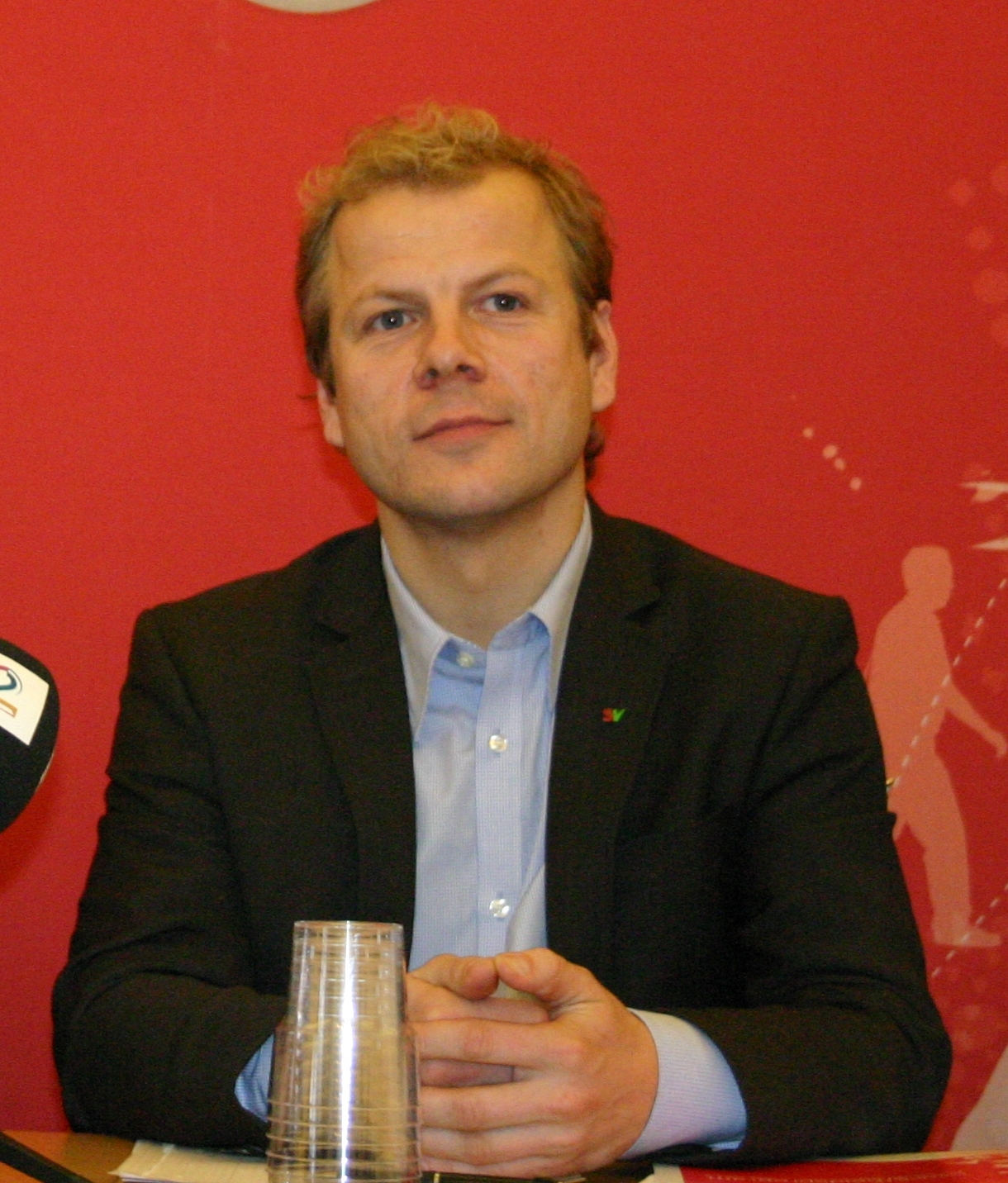

Minister of International Development
- In office 23 March 2012 – 16 October 2013
- Prime Minister: Jens Stoltenberg
- Preceded by: Erik Solheim
- Succeeded by: Nikolai Atsrup (2018)

Member of the Norwegian Parliament
- In office 1 October 2001 – 30 September 2017
- Deputy: Mari Lund Arnem; Akhtar Chaudhry; Ingunn Gjerstad
- Constituency: Oslo

Personal details
- Born: Heikki Eidsvoll Holmås; 28 June 1972 (age 53) Voss Municipality, Hordaland, Norway
- Party: Socialist Left
- Spouse: Sunniva Holmås Eidsvoll (m. 2012)
- Parent: Stig Holmås (father)
- Occupation: Politician

Heikki Eidsvoll Holmås (born 28 June 1972 in Voss Municipality) is a Norwegian politician for the Socialist Left Party (SV). He served as Minister of International Development from 2012 to 2013 being the last to serve in the position until Nikolai Astrup in 2018.

== Personal life ==
Holmås is son of librarian/writer Stig Holmås and engineer/textile worker Ingebjørg Monsen.

Holmås married his wife, fellow party politician, Sunniva Pettersen Eidsvoll, in 2012. In 2013 his stepfather died in the In Amenas terror attack.

== Board game player ==
Heikki Holmås is a former Diplomacy player and won the 1994 Norway Championship.

== Career ==
He has served as member of the Parliament of Norway, representing Oslo from 2001 – 2012. He previously served as a deputy representative from 1997 – 2001. He is nominated on the top spot on Oslo SV's ballot for the 2013 Norwegian parliamentary election.

Holmås finished upper secondary school at Bergen Cathedral School, in Bergen from 1988 to 1991. Before entering politics, he worked as a waste collection worker in the Municipality of Bergen.

Holmås has been a columnist in both the woman's magazine Kamille and in the left-wing newspaper Klassekampen. He has contributed with an article in a book about climate change, Kan hende det gjelder å redde vår jord – Om venstresiden og klimapolitikken published in Norwegian in 2009 by Manifest.

Party political offices
Preceded by Andreas Tjernshaugen	Leader of the Socialist Youth; 1996–1999	Succeeded by Kari-Anne Moe
