= Joan Hills =

British artist

Joan Hills (née Little, 4 April 1931 – 18 March 2024) was a British artist originally from Edinburgh, Scotland, who lived and worked in London for most of her life.

Her most prominent work was made within the long-standing artist collective Boyle Family which she founded in the 1980s with her partner Mark Boyle (1934 - 2005). The collaborative group also includes their two children Sebastian Boyle (b. 1962) and Georgia Boyle (b.1963).

== Boyle family ==
One of Boyle Family's most renowned works is World Series or Journey to the Surface of the Earth which began at a party at the Institute of Contemporary Arts, London in 1968, where Joan Hills and Mark Boyle invited the guests to throw darts at a 1:10,000,000 map of the world. The exact points where the darts landed have been the focus and source material for photographic, sculptural and film works. The introduction of chance (and performance) within the conception of the work aligns their approach with Fluxus although their pared back, literal copying (casting) of plain urban environments often looks like Minimalism.

Boyle Family's work is held within collections including The National Galleries of Scotland and The Scottish Parliament.

In 1978 the Boyle Family went to Venice to participate in the Venice Biennale, selected to exhibit in the British Pavilion. The work was made collaboratively but was labelled as Mark Boyle's. By the end of 1978 they were exhibiting as 'Mark Boyle and Joan Hills', but it took until the mid-1980s for them to start exhibiting as Boyle Family.

== Formative years of collaboration ==
In the 1950s Joan Hills lived in Sussex and had a son, Cameron Hills (b.1952), who was initially also involved in Boyle Family art projects.

Joan Hills and Mark Boyle met in April 1957 in Harrogate, Yorkshire. At that point Mark Boyle considered himself a poet and it was only after experimenting with Joan Hills' paints that he became involved in Visual arts. Mark Boyle cited Joan Hills as one of his greatest influences, saying she was "she was gentle, brave and immensely resourceful" in an interview with Henry Lydiate. The couple then moved onto making Assemblage (art) a progression towards the sculptural work which forms much of their oeuvre as Boyle Family.

During the 1960s they were heavily involved in the Psychedelic era night club and Happening scene in England, pioneering the use of transparent surfaces, oil, acid, body fluids and collaged images combined with projectors to create Liquid light shows. During this era they worked with rock band Soft Machine and musician Jimi Hendrix, regularly performing at the UFO nightclub in London.

== Later life and death ==
Joan Hills and Mark Boyle married in 1999. Mark Boyle died in 2005.

Hills died on 18 March 2024, at the age of 92.
