= Bob Masse =

Canadian concert poster artist (1945–2026)

Robert Joseph Masse (April 5, 1945 – 21 September 2026) was a Canadian artist from British Columbia. He designed concert posters from the 1960s. While attending art school in Vancouver, he began doing posters for the folk acts that came through town. Masse was greatly influenced by the art and music scenes in Los Angeles and San Francisco, where he lived in the late 1960s, producing posters and album covers for various bands of the day. In later life, Masse produced pieces for contemporary performers such as Tori Amos, the Smashing Pumpkins, Neil Young and others.

== Life and career ==
After graduation, Masse went on to attend art school in Vancouver; a fixture at local coffee-houses, he was asked to design posters advertising upcoming folk music performances. With the rise of folk-rock, Vancouver played host to concerts from the Grateful Dead, Jefferson Airplane and the Steve Miller Band, with Masse contributing increasingly psychedelicized artwork for their appearances. In 1966 he travelled to San Francisco. Direct contact with the poster art of The Fillmore and the Family Dog exerted a profound influence on his subsequent work.

Returning to Vancouver, Masse, now a Scientologist, befriended the local band the Collectors, and when they travelled to Los Angeles to make a record he followed, spending the final years of the 1960s living in the Laurel Canyon area. In 1969 he returned to Vancouver, producing a series of posters for local venues including the Retinal Circus, Moose Valley Farms, and Gassy Jack's. During the 1970s Masse undertook commercial work, illustrating for McDonald's, the Expo Space Station, CP Air, Lock-It Guitar Straps, and others. Masse additionally designed numerous business logos, among them an orange fox for radio station C-FOX.

During the 1980s, Masse created posters for films including Total Recall and Back to the Future Part III; he also worked on the television series Teenage Mutant Ninja Turtles. As rock concert art began to enjoy a surge in popularity during the following decade, however, Masse returned to poster design for the Smashing Pumpkins, Red Hot Chili Peppers, Tori Amos, Alanis Morissette, and others.

Masse died on 21 September 2026, at the age of 81.
