= John Hurford =

John Hurford (born 1948) is a prolific English psychedelic artist. He was born on a farm in Chulmleigh, Devon, England and began painting soon after he left school in 1964. Self-taught and with no formal training, he quickly became one of the real forces behind the British psychedelic art movement, and he was a contributor to all three of the most influential and important underground publications of the 1960s: Oz (magazine), Gandalf's Garden and International Times.

He is an honorary member of the South West Academy. His work has been reproduced in many magazines and books since the nineteen sixties and his early work is in the collection of the Victoria and Albert Museum, London, UK. He has been shown in the Victoria and Albert Museum, London, Whitney Museum of American Art The Whitney in New York and The Tate Gallery in Liverpool.

His early work (as much of it still is today) was crowded with flowers, birds and insects – highly detailed observations from the natural world he saw around him in the Devon countryside where he lives.

He started to work on the farm immediately on leaving school at sixteen and continued to draw and paint. In the late sixties he successfully submitted work to counter-culture magazines. He painted in the evenings while working on the farm. He continued to work on books and produced fine art paintings, first in oils then in acrylics, pencil and watercolour. He has had many books published, has had many exhibitions locally and in New Zealand, France and London.

In 2001 he started painting full time still designing posters and album covers including Gryphon (Band), Judy Dyble, Lowell Lovinger (The Youngbloods), Barry Melton, It's a beautiful Day, Martin Stone (guitarist) but concentrates on fine art painting – usually in acrylic on canvas, paper or wood panel.

== Bibliography ==
1970: Betty's Wonderful Christmas – Pam Gems (St Lukes Press) UK illustrated

1972: The Eternal Man – Louis Pauwels and Jacques Bergier (Souvenir Press) UK cover

1973: Moby Dick – Herman Melville (J.M.Dent) UK cover

1974: The Lion of Boaz-Jachim and Jachim-Boaz – Russell Hoban (Cape) UK, cover

1973: The Spring on the Mountain – Judy Allen (Cape) UK cover

1974: The Dormouse – John Hurford (Cape) written and illustrated,(Spindlewood) UK hardback and paperback reprint

1974: The Faerie Queen – Edmund Spenser (J.M.Dent) UK cover

1974: The Lion of Boaz-Jachim and Jachim-Boaz (Picador) UK cover

1974: The Whys and Wherefores of Littabelle Lee – Vera and Bill Cleaver (Hamish Hamilton) UK cover

1974: World Wildlife Diary (Collins) UK all illustrations

1975: ABC of Animals (Cape) UK written and illustrated

1975: The Whispering Butterfly – George Lavin UK cover

1980: Fredgehog – John Hurford (Spindlewood) UK written and illustrated

1988: Jordy – Mary-Ellen Lang Collura (Spindlewood) UK cover

1988 Julie – Cora Taylor (Spindlewood) UK cover

1989: Alex – Tessa Duder (Penguin) NZ cover

1989: At Night – Marcia Vaughan (Shortland) NZ, US, Aus illustrated

1989: The Crab at the Bottom of the Sea (Shortland) NZ, US, Aus illustrated

1989: The Priests of Ferris – Maurice Gee (Puffin) NZ cover

1989: The Ultimate Heresy – John Seymour (Green Books) UK cover

1990: A Happy Tale – Dorothy Butler (Random Century) NZ, (Crocodile Books) US, (Bodley Head) UK illustrated

1990: Dump Bear – Jenny Hessell (Random Century) NZ, (Ashton Scholastic) global illustrated

1990: Son of Thunder – Stig Holmas (Spindlwood) UK illustrated

1990: The Little Spider – Margaret Beames (Shortland) NZ, US, Aus illustrated

1990: The Myth of the Market – Jeremy Seabrook (Green Books) UK cover

1990: The Selfish Giant – Leanna Traill (Shortland) NZ, US, Aus illustrated

1991: Alex in Winter – Tessa Duder (Penguin) NZ cover

1991: Amazing Journeys – Ron Bacon (Shortland) NZ, US, Aus part illustrated

1991: Another Happy Tale – Dorothy Butler (Random Century) NZ, (Crocodile Books) US illustrated

1991: Famous Children – Allen Trussell-Cullen (Shortland) NZ, US, Aus part illustrated

1991: Mr Cat – Ruth Corrin (Random Century) NZ illustrated

1992: Alessandra – Alex in Rome (Penguin) NZ cover

1992: `Bow Down Shadrach – Joy Cowley (Puffin) NZ cover

1992: Hideaway – Joan de Hamel (Puffin) NZ cover

1992: Marcella – Owen McShane (Shortland) NZ, US, Aus, illustrated

1992: Rabbit Stew – John Hurford (Shortland) NZ, US, Aus written and illustrated

1992: Songs for Alex – Tessa Duduer (Oxford University Press) NZ cover

1993: Big Green Caterpillar – Julie Holland (Shortland) NZ, US, Aus illustrated

1993: How Fire Came to Earth – Avelyn Davidson (Shortland) NZ, US, Aus illustrated

1993: I Have a Question Grandma – Catie Belleveau (Shortland) NZ, US, Aus illustrated

1993: Isememe's Stories – Isimeme Ibazebo (Spindlewood) NZ, (Bok Books) Pan African illustrated

1993: Someone Came Knocking – Anne Merrick (Spindlewood) cover

1993: The Haunted Glass – Diane Howells (Spindlewood) UK cover

1994: A Wetland Home – Mary Small (Sunshine Books) Aus, NZ, US illustrated

1994: Apache Pass – Stig Holmas (Spindlewood) UK cover

1994: Hide and Seek – Saviour Pirotta (Collins) UK illustrated

1994: Luke's First Day – Chris Lutratio (Collins) UK illustrated

1994: Watery Worlds – Janine Scott (Shortland) NZ, US, Aus part illustrated

1994: What am I? – Susan Brocker (Shortland) NZ, US, Aus part illustrated

1995: Columbine – Franzeska G. Ewart (Spindlewood) UK cover

1995: Dark Waters – Tessa Potter (Spindlewood) UK cover

1995: Fira Wagons – Stig Holmas (Spindlewood) UK illustrated

1996: Hannah's Ghosts – Anne Merrick (Spindlewood0_ UK cover

1996: Honey Tree – Traditional (Shortland) NZ, US, Aus cover

1995: In the Past – Susan Brocker (Shortland) NZ, US, Aus part illustrated

1996: People of the Rising Sun – Stig Holmas (Spindlewood) UK illustrated

1996: Te Papaka – Leanna Trail (Shortland) NZ illustrated

1995: Trog – Ruth Corrin (Sunshine Books) NZ illustrated

1997: Burrows – Marcia Vaughan (Shortlands) NZ, US, Aus illustrated

1997: How Lizard Lost His Colors – Jay Steele (Shortlands) NZ, US, Aus illustrated

1997: Nature Detective – Lynette Evans (Shortlands) NZ, US, Aus illustrated

1997: No Roof in Bosnia – Els de Groen (Spindlewood) UK cover

1997: Roberto's Smile – Joy Cowley (Shortland) NZ, US, Aus illustrated

1997: The Story of Small Fry – Marcia Vaughan (Shortland) NZ, US, Aus illustrated

1997: The Sunday Horse – Marie Gibson (Shortland) NZ, US, Aus illustrated

1997: What Can it Be? – Dorothy Avery (Shortland) NZ, US, Aus illustrated

1997: Who? – Augie Hunter (Shortland) NZ, US, Aus illustrated

1997: Whose Tracks? – Marcia Vaughan (Celebration Press) US illustrated

1998: Como Aprendio A Volar El Murcielago – Edwin Johns (Shortland) NZ, US, Aus illustrated

1998: How Bat Learned to Fly – Edwin Johns (Shortlands) NZ, US, Aus illustrated

1998: Snow – Jo Windsor (Heinemann) NZ illustrated

1999: Androcles and the Lion – Janine Scott (Shortland) NZ, US, AUS, UK illustrated

1999: Isn't it Cool? – Diana Short Yurkovic (Shortland) NZ, US, Aus part illustrated

2000: Snake's Reward – Traditional (Mexico) (Shortland) NZ, US, Aus illustrated

2000: What's this Spider Doing? – John Hurford (Shortland) NZ, US, Aus written and illustrated

2001: No Roof in Bosnia – Els de Groen (Spindlewood) UK new cover

2001: The Dead are listening – Francis McCrickard (Spindlewood) UK cover

2001: Snow Globe – Anne Merrick (Spindlewood) UK cover

2006: Johnny, the Work of Psychedelic Artist John Hurford – John Hurford, edited Jonathan Hill (Sunrise Press) UK, Global entire

2010: Ackroyd's Ark Two – charity book for Tusk Trust one painting

2014: The Art of Big O (Big Vision Publishing) US, UK ten pages

2014: South West Academy Art+People+Place – Michael Carter (Halstar) examples of his fine art

2015: Later Graphic Work – John Hurford (Wixon Editions) entire

2016: You Say You Want a Revolution (Exhibition catalogue – Victoria and Albert Museum, London) UK (Harry N Abrahams) US

2016: Rural Bliss (Wixon Editions) entire

2017: British Underground Press of the Sixties (Rocket 88) UK illustrations included

2018: It Must be Art – Michael Fishel (Schiffer) US

2018: Moth – Jane Springer (LSU Press) US cover

2019: One Hundred Years of the Society of Graphic Fine Arts (SGFA) UK examples of his fine art
