= Brummbaer =

German digital artist

Brummbaer was a German digital artist who worked as an art director, designer, graphic artist, and 3D modeler. As an actor, he appeared in various German TV movies, and also produced and directed. In the latter part of his career he became focused on computer graphics, created several short computer-generated animations and made visual effects for movies.

== Life ==
Brummbaer's fine art and underground magazine Germania brought him recognition in Europe during the 1960s, and he orchestrated light shows for musicians such as Frank Zappa and Tangerine Dream. He found his most expressive medium when he discovered the computer.

He was one of the primary computer animators responsible for the special effects in the Tristar motion picture Johnny Mnemonic. He also created an innovative opener for SIGGRAPH’s 1995 "Electronic Theater," and was long a pioneer in the world of digital animation, where he was noted for his signature hallucinogenic style.

In the autumn of 2003 he was diagnosed with Head and neck cancer. During several months of chemo- and radiation-therapy he wrote a semi-biographical novel titled Runway Jesus, which recounted his experiments with the drug dextromethorphan hydrobromide (DXM), followed by What's so Wrong with Love and Peace- Adventures in the European Underground 1965-67. Both available as E-books at Amazon, iTunes, etc. He survived the head and neck cancer, but in 2007 was diagnosed with bladder cancer, which was treated with two bladder resections. He was cancer free from that time to 2013 when the bladder cancer returned. 2011 RUNAWAY JESUS was published in a German translation as DER GAMMLER. (Werner Piepers „Der Grüne Zweig“). Brummbaer died on January 16, 2016.

== Career ==
Between 1964 and 1967 Brummbaer traveled across Europe as a pavement-painter and in 1967 he had his first exhibition of paintings at the Art's Lab in London. He later moved to Frankfurt in 1968 where he designed psychedelic posters and founded Germany's first lightshow-company, the “Exploding Galaxy.” They performed for Tangerine Dream, Amon Duul, The Fugs, Frank Zappa, etc. They also shot a Lightshow film: “Astronomy Domine” with Knollfick, (music Pink Floyd).

Due to his large and rare collection of underground comics, Brummbaer translated and edited Robert Crumb’s first book in Germany. With the success of the book he was able start a comic-book-company "Brumm Comix." With the profits of comic-book-company he was able to publish “Germania,” an underground German magazine. It was during this time that Brummbaer was politically involved in the squatting of houses for the homeless and the legalisation of marijuana and other nonaddictive soft drugs.

From 1972–1973 he spent nine month writing and recording “Maschine Nr.9,” a radio play with Wolf Wondratschek and Georg Deuter.

== Filmography ==
=== Actor ===
- Der Allerletzte (1979) (TV) (as Brummbär)
- Die Sweethearts (1977) (TV)
- Warum der Himmel kein Flugzeug ist

=== Director ===
- CyberWorld (2000)
- The Last Trip to Harrisburg (1984) (aka "Die letzte Fahrt nach Harrisburg")

=== Production Designer ===
Klaus Lemke:

- Idole (1975, TV film)
- Die Sweethearts (1977, TV film)
- Moto-Cross (1977, TV film)
- Der Allerletzte (1979, TV film)
- Arabian Nights (1979)
- Dark Seed (1992, VG)

=== Other ===
- Illustrator: German Edition Magazines - Playboy, Penthouse, Transatlantic
- Painter: Exhibition at Gallery Klinzer, Munich, Magic Realism
- Animator: German Television "XX, Clip-Cafe": Production design, openers, bumpers, and stage design for Youth-oriented shows.

== Computer graphics ==
In 1986, the International Synergy Institute in Los Angeles invited Brummbaer to be artist in residence to work on their Fairlight CVI computer where he created several ¾" videos: "New Worlds,” “Orient Ma Mind An Touch Ma Hal,” “Pretty Please." Another reason to live in LA was his friendship with Dr. Timothy Leary, Dr. John C. Lilly and his wife Toni. Since the introduction of the personal computer he promoted and exercised digital design, creating art for games and special effects for movies. In 1988 he worked on Futique Inc.'s "Cyberpunk Interscreen/The Mind Movie" in collaboration with Timothy Leary. Stubbornly insisting to only design on computers allowed only for a modest living by generating covers for books, records and magazines.

During 1991–1993, Brummbaer served as the Art Director for the game Dark Seed, in the style of, and in collaboration with H.R. Giger. For the movie Critters 4 he created the computer graphics on a PC. The "Digital Be-In" in San Francisco and the Zero-One Gallery, Los Angeles showed his first exhibition of electronic paintings, hosted by Timothy Leary. Timothy Leary's last book "Chaos and Cyberculture" contains many illustrations by Brummbaer.

=== Sony Pictures Imageworks ===
- 1994 Johnny Mnemonic (Opener/Cyberspace)
- 1995 L.A. SIGGRAPH Electronic Theater (Opener) "The Craft" (butterflies)
- 1996 Odyssey into the Mind’s Eye (Opener for "Mind’s Eye”), "Computer Animation Classics" (Opener for "Mind’s Eye Classics”), "Dark Skies" (TV Series pilot) "Jonny Quest" (cartoon)
- 1997 L.A. SIGGRAPH "Electronic Theatre" (Opener) SDDS Logo (Cinematic Opener) "En Vogue" MTV video

=== Other film work ===
- 1998 2½ minutes IMAX/3D CyberWorld (2000)
- 1999 Bill Gates' Basement (animated short)
- 2000–2001 "Thru the Moebius Strip" with Jean Girard Moebius - 3-Minute trailer
- 2001–2002 Researching "Non-Photo-Real Renderers" Toto's Dream—Animation short
- 2003 The Story of Computer Graphics (Dir. Frank Foster, Opener/Closer)

=== Games ===
Brummbaer is credited for several games he worked on including SimCity (1989), Wolfpack (1990), Robo Sport (1991), Comanche (1992), Dark Seed (1992), Q*bert (1992), Shrek 2 (2004), True Crime: New York City (2005) and Kung Fu Panda (2007).

== Awards ==
- Imagina - Monte' Carlo - Content graphics (1997)
- International Monitor Award - Openers/Closers (1998)
- "Bill Gates Basement" - Siggraph Animation Theatre (1999)
