= Stig Holmås =

Norwegian author

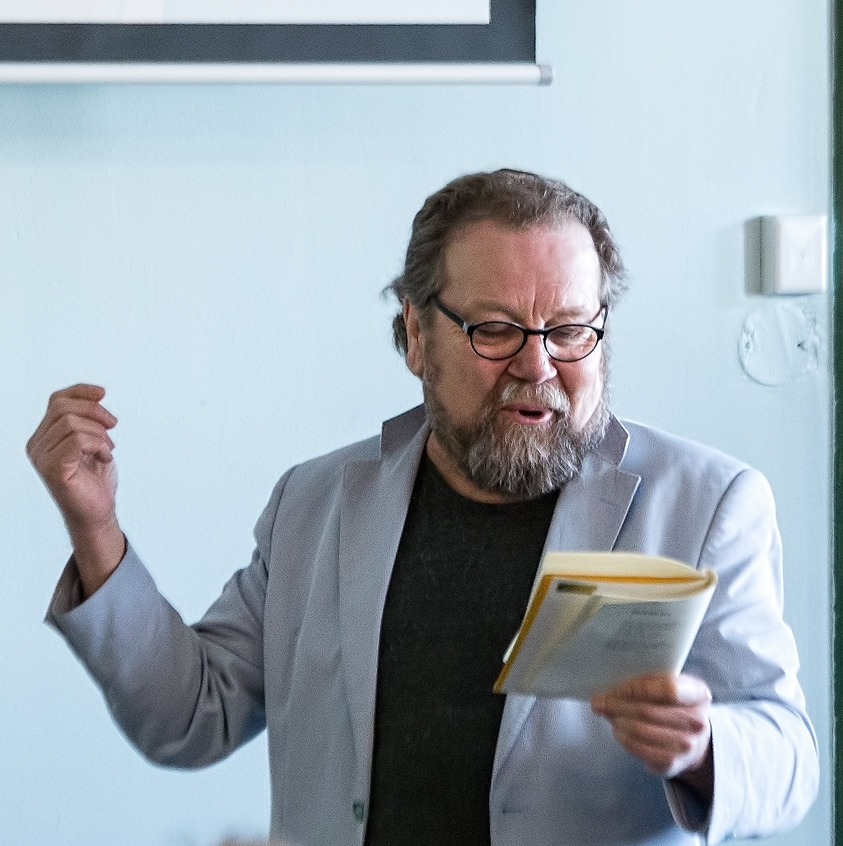
Author Stig Holmås

Stig Holmås (born 25 February 1946) is a Norwegian librarian, poet, novelist and children's writer. He was born in Bergen. He made his literary debut in the 1969 anthology Åtte fra Bergen. Among his poetry collections are Vi er mange from 1970 and Tenke på i morgen from 1972. Among his novels are O.K. Corral from 1991 and Regn from 2008. He has written two book series for children about the Indigenous peoples of the Americas.

He is the father of Heikki Holmås.
