= Oscar Janiger =

American experimental psychiatrist

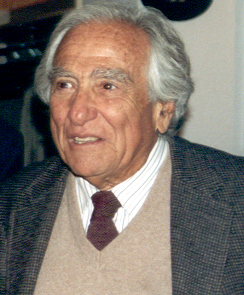
- Janiger at the 50th Anniversary of LSD conference in Lugano, Switzerland, 1993
- Born: February 8, 1918; New York City
- Died: August 14, 2001 (aged 83); Torrance, California
- Occupation: Experimental psychiatrist
- Known for: LSD research
- Spouse: Kathleen Delaney Janiger
- Children: Robert Janiger; David Janiger

Oscar Janiger (February 8, 1918 – August 14, 2001) was an experimental psychiatrist and a University of California, Irvine, psychiatrist and psychotherapist, best known for his LSD research, which lasted from 1954 to 1962.

== Early life ==
Janiger was born on February 8, 1918, in New York City, New York. Beat poet and author Allen Ginsberg was a cousin.

== Career ==
He moved to Los Angeles in 1950, setting up a private practice and later teaching at the University of California, Irvine.

As a pioneer advocate of hallucinogens, Janiger introduced LSD to Cary Grant, Aldous Huxley, and other celebrities, taking the drug 13 times himself. He was interested in the relationship between creativity and mind-expanding drugs. He said,

It really took me out of a state in which I saw the boundaries of myself and the world around me very rigorously prescribed, to a state in which I saw that many, many things were possible...

He bought the then-legal drugs from a Swiss company, Sandoz Laboratories, abandoning his research when the U.S. Government began investigating researchers in 1962. The drugs were made illegal in 1966.

In 1986, he formed the Albert Hofmann Foundation for psychedelic research, named after the chemist who first synthesized LSD.

His work pre-dated Timothy Leary's but was not recognised widely because he did not publish his data. Janiger administered the drugs in his Los Angeles office.

== Experiments ==
He had 900 people take LSD (usually 2 micrograms per kilogram of bodyweight) and recorded their experiences. The participants included celebrities, actors, writers, college students, a Deputy Marshall, housewives, attorneys, clerical assistants, counselors, medical personnel, dentists, physicians, and engineers.

=== Frank Murdoch ===
A sub-study within Janiger's research focused specifically on artists and creativity. One patient of Janiger's, bipolar and alcoholic artist Frank Murdoch, was given a controlled, experimental dose of LSD for several months as an attempt to cure his late stage alcoholism (probably a less well-known purpose to his LSD experiments, but very common in the era). Janiger had Murdoch paint still lifes both on and off LSD, including a Kachina doll (that he reportedly had 70 other patients also paint).

The artists produced some 250 paintings and drawings after ingesting LSD. Historian Carl Hertel analyzed the art in 1971 and compared it to the artists' non-LSD work. Hertel found while the LSD art was neither superior nor inferior to the artists' other work, it was brighter, more abstract and non-representational, and tended to fill the entire canvas.

Two follow-up studies have been done. The first, done by Janiger around 1968, collected questionnaires from about 200 of the original participants. Much of this data remains unanalyzed and only a limited amount has been published.

A second follow-up study was conducted in 1999 by Rick Doblin, Jerome E. Beck, Kate Chapman and Maureen Alioto, 40 years after the original experimental LSD sessions. Taped interviews were completed by 45 of Janiger's original participants, as well as Janiger himself. The study concluded that the experiences were positive overall, but only 1/3 of the follow-up subjects reported long-term benefits from the LSD experiences.

== Other ==
Also at the Irvine faculty, he studied the connection between hormones and premenstrual depression in women. Janiger was also involved with a group studying dolphins in their natural environment.

== Publications ==
Janiger published a few journal articles and one book entitled A Different Kind of Healing in 1993 with Philip Goldberg. The book details physicians' views on the use of alternative medicine within traditional medical practice. Janiger also coauthored a second book with Marlene Dobkin de Rios about his LSD research—which was published posthumously in 2003 by Park Street Press—entitled LSD, Spirituality, and the Creative Process.

== Media ==
He took part in a documentary on psychedelics and creativity, Drug-taking, and the Arts.

== Personal life ==
A dedicated ocean swimmer, in his 60s, Janiger won a race from Santa Monica to Venice Pier and swam regularly in the ocean for a further 10 years.

Janiger was affectionately referred to as "Oz "by his close friends. He married three times; his third wife, Kathleen Delaney Janiger, died before him, in February 2001.

== Death ==
He died of heart and kidney failure at the Little Company of Mary Hospital on August 14, 2001, in Torrance, California. He was 83.

He was survived by sons Robert and David; sister, Estelle Rosten and a brother, Nat. Oscar Janiger continued his psychiatric practice until a month before his death.

== Sources ==
- Erowid online biography of Janiger
