= List of psychedelic rock artists =

The following is a list of artists considered to be general purveyors of the psychedelic rock genre.

== 1960s–early 1970s ==
=== 0–E ===
- The 13th Floor Elevators
- Aguaturbia
- Daevid Allen
- The Amboy Dukes
- Andromeda
- Apple Pie Motherhood Band
- Syd Barrett
- The Beatles
- Bee Gees (early work)
- Big Brother and the Holding Company
- Blue Cheer
- Blues Magoos
- Curt Boettcher
- Braen's Machine
- The Byrds
- Robert Calvert
- Canned Heat
- The Charlatans
- Robert Charlebois
- The Chocolate Watchband
- Eric Clapton (with Cream)
- Gene Clark
- Ray Columbus
- Cold Sun
- Comus
- Larry Coryell
- Count Five
- Country Joe and the Fish
- Coven
- The Crazy World of Arthur Brown
- Cream
- The Creation
- Creation of Sunlight
- The Daily Flash
- Deep Purple (early work)
- The Deviants
- The Doors
- The Electric Prunes
- Roky Erickson

=== F–M ===
- Fifty Foot Hose
- Freedom
- Frijid Pink
- Frumious Bandersnatch
- Jerry Garcia
- Gale Garnett (late 1960s work)
- The Golden Dawn
- Gong
- Grateful Dead
- The Great Society
- Hawkwind
- Jimi Hendrix
- The Jimi Hendrix Experience
- Hunger
- International Harvester
- Iron Butterfly
- It's a Beautiful Day
- Tommy James
- Jefferson Airplane
- Janis Joplin
- Paul Kantner
- Cem Karaca
- Phil Keaggy
- Erkin Koray
- Arthur Lee
- Lothar and the Hand People
- Love
- Love Sculpture
- Mac MacLeod
- Barış Manço
- Roger McGuinn
- Barry Melton
- Mighty Baby
- Steve Miller (early work)
- Steve Miller Band
- Moby Grape
- Moğollar
- Jim Morrison
- Os Mutantes
- The Mystery Trend

=== N–Z ===
- Nirvana (British band)
- Shuggie Otis
- Panbers
- The Paper Garden
- The Peanut Butter Conspiracy
- Pink Fairies
- Pink Floyd
- Pretty Things
- Procol Harum
- Quicksilver Messenger Service
- Les Rallizes Dénudés
- Ramases
- Red Krayola
- La Revolución de Emiliano Zapata
- The Rolling Stones (Their Satanic Majesties Request era)
- Santana
- The Savage Resurrection
- Irmin Schmidt
- The Seeds
- Tru Goddezz
- Shocking Blue
- Silver Apples
- Darby Slick
- Grace Slick
- Soft Machine
- The Sonic Dawn
- Sons of Champlin
- Sopwith Camel
- Speed, Glue & Shinki
- Spirit
- Skip Spence
- Steamhammer
- Sly Stone
- Strawberry Alarm Clock
- Sugarloaf
- Sweetwater
- Tangerine Dream (late 1960s work)
- Tomorrow
- Tractor
- Ultimate Spinach
- Vanilla Fudge
- The West Coast Pop Art Experimental Band
- Keith West
- Brian Wilson
- Robert Wyatt
- Ya Ho Wha 13
- The Yardbirds
- Zakary Thaks

== Later years ==
- The Aliens
- Allah-Las
- Ancient River
- Arctic Monkeys
- Baby Guru
- The Black Angels
- Black Mountain
- Black Rebel Motorcycle Club
- Blood Incantation
- The Brian Jonestown Massacre
- The Church
- Cloudland Canyon
- Cobweb Strange
- Dead Meadow
- Mac DeMarco
- The Devil's Blood
- DMBQ
- Earthless
- Elder
- Endless Boogie
- The Features
- The Flaming Lips
- Foxygen
- The Fresh & Onlys
- Glim Spanky
- Golden Void
- The High Learys
- The Holydrug Couple
- Hopewell
- Jess and the Ancient Ones
- Kadavar
- Kikagaku Moyo
- King Gizzard & the Lizard Wizard
- Kula Shaker
- Jasper Leach
- Lusk
- Meat Puppets
- Michio Kurihara
- MGMT
- Oneida
- Phish
- A Place to Bury Strangers
- Pond
- Tim Presley (a.k.a. White Fence)
- Psychedelic Porn Crumpets
- Psychic TV
- Secret Machines
- Ty Segall
- Serena-Maneesh
- The Shamen (early work)
- Spirits and the Melchizedek Children
- Sticky Fingers
- Kelley Stoltz
- Sunflower Bean
- Swervedriver
- Syd Arthur
- Tame Impala
- Thee Oh Sees
- Thin White Rope
- Toploader
- Tumbleweed
- Unknown Mortal Orchestra
- Warpaint
- White Denim
- White Hills (band)
- Witchcraft
- Wolfmother
- Woods
- Yeasayer
- Zoé

== See also ==
- List of acid rock artists
- List of psychedelic folk artists
- List of psychedelic pop artists
- List of neo-psychedelia artists

== Bibliography ==
- Adelt, Ulrich (2010). Blues Music in the Sixties: A Story in Black and White. Rutgers University Press. ISBN 978-0-8135-4750-3.
- Budofsky, Adam, ed. (2006). The Drummer: 100 Years of Rhythmic Power and Invention. Hal Leonard Corporation. ISBN 978-1-4234-0567-2.
- Clarke, Donald (1998). The Penguin Encyclopedia of Popular Music. Penguin Books. ISBN 978-0-1405-1370-7.
- DeRogatis, Jim (2003). Turn On Your Mind: Four Decades of Great Psychedelic Rock. Hal Leonard Corporation. ISBN 0-634-05548-8.
- Doggett, Peter (2008). There's a Riot Going On: Revolutionaries, Rock Stars, and the Rise and Fall of the '60s Counter-Culture. Canongate. ISBN 978-1-8476-7114-1.
- George-Warren, Holly; Romanowski, Patricia, eds. (2001). The Rolling Stone Encyclopedia of Rock & Roll (3rd ed.). Fireside. ISBN 0-7432-9201-4.
- Goffman, Ken; Joy, Dan (2004). Counterculture Through the Ages: From Abraham to Acid House. Villard. ISBN 0-375-50758-2.
- Hecker, Pierre (2016). Turkish Metal: Music, Meaning, and Morality in a Muslim Society. Routledge. ISBN 978-1-3155-4953-8.
- Horgby, Björn; Nilsson, Fredrik, eds. (2010). Rockin' the Borders: Rock Music and Social, Cultural and Political Change. Cambridge Scholars Publishing. ISBN 978-1-4438-2163-6.
- Issitt, Micah L. (2009). Hippies: A Guide to an American Subculture. Greenwood Press. ISBN 978-0-313-36572-0.
- Joyson, Vernon (1984). The Acid Trip: A Complete Guide to Psychedelic Music. Babylon Books. ISBN 978-0-907188-24-7.
- Kitts, Jeff; Tolinski, Brad, eds. (2002). Guitar World Presents the 100 Greatest Guitarists of All Time: From the Pages of Guitar World Magazine. Hal Leonard Corporation. ISBN 0-634-04619-5.
- Larkin, Colin, ed. (2006). Encyclopedia of Popular Music (4th ed.). Oxford University Press. ISBN 0-19-531373-9.
- Linstrum, Cory M. (2016). The Rock & Roll of San Francisco's East Bay, 1950–1980. Scene History. Vol. 2. Microcosm Publishing. ISBN 978-0-312-13499-0.
- Luft, Eric v.d. (2009). Die at the Right Time!: A Subjective Cultural History of the American Sixties. Gegensatz Press. ISBN 978-0-9655179-2-8.
- McIver, Joel (2012). Unleashed: The Story of Tool. Omnibus Press. ISBN 978-0-85712-770-9.
- Morales, Ed (2003). The Latin Beat: The Rhythms and Roots of Latin Music from Bossa Nova to Salsa and Beyond. Da Capo Press. ISBN 0-306-81018-2.
- Moskowitz, David V., ed. (2015). The 100 Greatest Bands of All Time: A Guide to the Legends Who Rocked the World. Vol. 2. ABC-CLIO. ISBN 978-1-4408-0340-6.
- Phillips, William; Cogan, Brian (2009). Encyclopedia of Heavy Metal Music. Greenwood Press. ISBN 978-0-313-34800-6.
- Prown, Pete; Newquist, HP (1997). Legends of Rock Guitar: The Essential Reference of Rock's Greatest Guitarists (4th ed.). Hal Leonard Corporation. ISBN 0-205-13703-2.
- Rees, Dafydd; Crampton, Luke (1999). Q Rock Stars Encyclopedia (New Revised ed.). DK. ISBN 0-7513-1113-8.
- Strong, Martin Charles; Griffin, Brendon (2008). Lights, camera, sound tracks. Canongate. ISBN 978-1-84767-003-8.
- Talevski, Nick (2006). Rock Obituaries – Knocking On Heaven's Door. Omnibus Press. ISBN 978-1-8460-9091-2.
- Thompson, Dave (2010). Bayou Underground: Tracing the Mythical Roots of American Popular Music. ECW Press. ISBN 978-1-55490-682-6.
- Unterberger, Richie (1999). Music USA: The Rough Guide. Rough Guides. ISBN 1-85828-421-X.
- Vincent, Rickey (1996). Funk: The Music, the People, and the Rhythm of the One. St. Martin's Press. ISBN 0-312-13499-1.
