= List of acid rock artists =

The following is a list of artists described as general purveyors of the acid rock genre. Acid rock is a loosely defined type of rock music that evolved out of the mid-1960s garage punk movement and helped launch the psychedelic subculture. The style is generally defined by heavy, distorted guitars, lyrics with drug references, and long improvised jams. Its distinctions from other genres can be tenuous, as much of the style overlaps with 1960s punk, proto-metal, and early heavy, blues-based hard rock.

== Artists ==
- The 13th Floor Elevators
- Alice Cooper (late 60s work)
- The Amboy Dukes
- Amon Düül
- Big Brother and the Holding Company
- Black Sabbath
- Blue Cheer
- Blues Magoos
- The Charlatans
- Count Five
- Country Joe and the Fish
- Coven
- Cream
- Deep Purple
- The Deviants
- The Doors
- The Electric Prunes
- The Fugs
- Grateful Dead
- The Great Society
- The Groundhogs
- Hawkwind
- Iron Butterfly
- Jefferson Airplane
- The Jimi Hendrix Experience
- Janis Joplin
- JPT Scare Band
- Love
- MC5
- Moby Grape
- The Music Machine
- Pentagram
- Pop Mašina
- Quicksilver Messenger Service
- Santana
- The Seeds
- Grace Slick
- Steppenwolf
- Tully
- Vanilla Fudge
- Wooden Shjips

== See also ==
- Acid rock
- List of psychedelic rock artists
- List of psychedelic folk artists
- List of psychedelic pop artists
- List of neo-psychedelia artists

== Bibliography ==
- Bartkowiak, Mathew J. (2009). The MC5 and Social Change: A Study in Rock and Revolution. McFarland & Company. ISBN 978-0-7864-4037-5.
- Bisbort, Alan; Puterbaugh, Parke (2000). Rhino's Psychedelic Trip. Hal Leonard Corporation. ISBN 9780879306267.
- Denisoff, R. Serge (1975). The Guide to United States Popular Culture. Transaction Publishers. ISBN 0-87855-586-2.
- Einarson, John (2001). Desperados: The Roots of Country Rock. Cooper Square Press. ISBN 978-0-8154-1065-2.
- Fletcher, Amy L. (2012). "Acid Rock". In Debolt, Abbe A.; Baugess, James S. (eds.). The Guide to United States Popular Culture. Vol. 1: A–M. Popular Press. pp. 7–8. ISBN 978-0-313-32944-9.
- Hall, Mitchell K. (2014). "Chapter 4: Psychedelia". The Emergence of Rock and Roll: Music and the Rise of American Youth Culture. Routledge. ISBN 978-0-415-83312-7.
- Hoffmann, Frank, ed. (2004). Encyclopedia of Recorded Sound. Routledge. ISBN 0-415-93835-X.
- Knowles, Christopher (2010). The Secret History of Rock 'n' Roll. Cleis Press. ISBN 978-1-57344-405-7.
- McIntyre, Iain, ed. (2006). Tomorrow Is Today: Australia in the Psychedelic Era, 1966–1970. Wakefield Press. ISBN 978-1-86254-697-4.
- Nagelberg, Kenneth M. (2001). "Acid Rock". In Browne, Ray Broadus; Browne, Pat (eds.). The Guide to United States Popular Culture. University of Wisconsin Press. p. 8. ISBN 9780879728212.
- Prown, Pete; Newquist, HP (1997). Legends of Rock Guitar: The Essential Reference of Rock's Greatest Guitarists (4th ed.). Hal Leonard Corporation. ISBN 0-7935-4042-9.
- Stephens, Julie (1998). Anti-Disciplinary Protest: Sixties Radicalism and Postmodernism. Cambridge University Press. ISBN 9780521629768.
- Wien, Gary (2003). Beyond the Palace. Trafford Publishing. ISBN 1-4120-0314-8.
- Werner, Craig Hansen (2006). A Change is Gonna Come: Music, Race & the Soul of America. University of Michigan. ISBN 0-472-03147-3.
