= Snow globe (disambiguation) =

A snow globe is a decorative item.

Snow globe or variations of the term may refer to:

- Snowglobe (film), a 2007 television film
- Snowglobe (band), an American band
- Snow Globe (album), a 2013 album by Erasure
- Snowglobe (EP), a 2011 EP by Jesca Hoop
- "Snow Globes", a song by Black Country, New Road from the 2022 album Ants from Up There

== See also ==
- Snow Dome (disambiguation)
- Snowdome (disambiguation)
