= Noctuary =

Noctuary may refer to:

- Noctuary, a 1994 book by Thomas Ligotti
- Noctuary, a 2013 album by the Holydrug Couple
- "Noctuary", a 2003 song by Bonobo from Dial 'M' for Monkey
