= Creation of Sunlight =

- Also known as: Sunlight Seven; Sunlight
- Origin: Long Beach, California, United States
- Genres: Psychedelic rock; sunshine pop; psychedelic pop
- Years active: 1968-1971
- Labels: DCT Recorders; Windi
- Past members: Gary Young; Carl Estrella; Don Sain; Steve Montague; Jerry Griffin; Bob Morgan; Ron Clark

Creation of Sunlight was an American psychedelic rock band formed originally as a cover group in Long Beach, California, in 1968. Though much of the group's history was initially unknown—even their name was obscured—over time they have come to the attention of psychedelic music enthusiasts for their sole album, which was released in 1969. The Creation of Sunlight's sound incorporated different aspects of their California contemporaries, such as the cheery nuance of sunshine pop and harder-edge acid rock.

== History ==
Originally known as the Sunlight Seven, the band was composed of Gary Young (lead vocals), Carl Estrella (lead guitar), Don Sain (rhythm guitar), Steve Montague (bass guitar), Jerry Griffin (keyboards, vocals), Bob Morgan (drums), and Ron Clark (percussion, flute, saxophone). All of the bandmates hailed from Long Beach, California, except Young who was previously from Oklahoma, and had been leading a band called the Torques. In early 1968, the group was brought to the attention of DCT Recorders, who signed them to a recording contract. However, the proposed album, under the working title Sunstroke, never materialized past the acetate stage, making it an extremely rare piece that was included in the book 1,001 Record Collector Dreams. In the book, it reveals at least five songs were featured on the record, two of which, "Sevens Theme" and "Judy in Disguise" never appeared on the Sunlight Seven's later releases.

After the Sunstroke project, the group changed their moniker to Sunlight, and released their debut single, "Colors of Love", on the newly formed Windi Records. The songs on the record are suspected to have been on the unknown flip-side of the Sunstroke LP as they are alternate versions of what was later released. Continuing to record under the Windi record label, the band expanded their name to Creation of Sunlight, and commenced work on their self-titled album. While commenting on the group's breezy vocal harmonies, music historian Richie Unterberger wrote: "it will recall the Strawberry Alarm Clock to many seasoned psychedelic listeners, as this too has a combination of thick organ and fuzz guitar, as well as material and vocal harmonies that are a rather lighter shade than the arrangements". Unterberger also compared the Creation of Sunlight's sound to the Association, Clear Light, and the West Coast Pop Art Experimental Band. A limited pressing of just 500 copies were distributed of the album, backed by their second single, "David", both of which inevitably did not sell well. Nonetheless, the group became a popular mainstay at the Whisky a Go Go toward the end of 1969, and made other notable performances at the Hollywood Bowl.

In 1971, the Creation of Sunlight disbanded. Overtime, their album has been the subject of numerous bootlegs, especially in Europe, and original copies of Creation of Sunlight have garnered four-figure asking prices. In 2005, Lion Productions made the first officially reissue of the album. Speaking on the album's rerelease, music critic Beverly Paterson said "'Creation of Sunlight' is a perfect example of flower power rock done right. Bathed in rays of juicy melodies, blissed-out singing, and progressive tempos and arrangements, the album offers endless treasures. It's not hard to hear the joy Sunlight experienced cutting the record, and we can only imagine where their subsequent steps would have taken them had they continued making music".
