= Ejekt Festival =

Rock music festival in Athens, Greece

Coordinates: 38.036160°N 23.783592°E

- The 2026 edition of Ejekt Festival logo.
- Genre: Alternative rock, indie, rock, metal, electronic, pop
- Dates: June–July
- Locations: Telekom Center Athens P5, Athens, Greece
- Years active: 2005–present
- Website: www.ejekt.gr

Ejekt Festival (often referred to simply as Ejekt) is an annual music festival that has taken place in Athens, Greece, since 2005. The festival began as a one-day event and later expanded into a multi-day one, featuring international and Greek artists from rock, alternative, indie, electronic and pop music.

== History ==
In its early years, the festival changed venues several times as the event grew. From 2011 to 2023, it was held primarily at Plateia Nerou in the Faliro Olympic Zone, with the exception of the 2022 edition, which took place at Telekom Center Athens P5. Since 2024, the festival has been held at Telekom Center Athens P5. In recent editions, it has usually taken place in July and has lasted two or three days.

From its first edition in 2005 through the announced 2026 edition, Ejekt Festival has featured, over 120 unique acts. Internationally recognized acts that have performed scheduled to perform, at Ejekt include, among others, The Chemical Brothers, New Order, Beastie Boys, Underworld, Pixies, Faith No More, Moby, Pet Shop Boys, Kasabian, Editors, Muse, The Killers, Nick Cave & The Bad Seeds, The Cure, Florence + The Machine, Korn, Måneskin, Bring Me the Horizon, Green Day, Louis Tomlinson, Suede, Nothing but Thieves and Matt Berninger.

A notable aspect of the festival’s history is that several headliners made their first appearance in Greece as part of Ejekt Festival. These include Beastie Boys in 2007, The Killers in 2017, Måneskin in 2024, Bring Me the Horizon, also in 2024, and Green Day in 2025.

== 2005 ==
Ejekt 2005 was the first edition of the festival and took place on 11 June 2005. A day full of electronic music at Hellinikon Olympic Complex.

11 June 2005

The Chemical Brothers
Bent
Dave Clarke
Miss Kittin
Cristian Varela
Expert Medicine

== 2006 ==
3 June 2006

New Order
Hooverphonic
Radio 4
James Lavelle
Miss Kittin
Vitalic
Phil Kieran
Marsheaux
Film

== 2007 ==
16 June 2007

Beastie Boys
Underworld
Madness
Absent Minded
Ded City Jetz

== 2008 ==
The 2008 edition of Ejekt took place at Hellinikon Fencing Hall.

28 June 2008

James
Stereo MC's
Unkle
Hercules & Love Affair
Digitalism
Transistor/Tech Soir
Photo Novela/Niko Vandoro

== 2009 ==
In the 2009 edition of Ejekt, a 2 days line up was introduced for the first time.

| 18 June 2009 | 19 June 2009 |
| Pixies; Editors; Starsailor; White Lies; The Mash Up | Royksopp; Jarvis Cocker; Klaxons; The Subways; 2ManyDJs Live; James Lavelle |

== 2010 ==
The 2010 edition of Ejekt was held at Faliro Sports Pavilion Arena.

13 July 2010

Faith No More
Bad Religion
Unkle
Zebra Tracks
Obojeni Program

== 2011 ==
In 2011, Ejekt moved to Plateia Nerou where it stayed for over 10 years. Amy Winehouse debut performance in Greece was cancelled.

13 July 2010

Amy Winehouse
Moby
Blackfield
The Vaccines
Baby Guru
Monovine

== 2012 ==
27 June 2012

Kasabian
James
Miles Kane
Band of Skulls
Customs
Wheatman

== 2013 ==
In the 2013 edition, Ejekt introduced a two stages setup.

16 July 2013
| Main Stage | Red Bull Bedroom Jam |
| Pet Shop Boys; Peter Hook and The Light; Faith SFX; James Blake; Wedding Singers | The Viper Vikings; Jamming Funkers; The Bittersweet |

== 2014 ==
In 2014, the festival celebrated its 10 years in existence.

25 June 2014

Kasabian
Editors
Paul Kalkbrenner
White Lies
Darkside
Inconsistencies
Brightside

== 2015 ==
15 July 2015

The Parov Stelar Band
Steve Aoki
Kadebostany
Glasvegas
Moon Duo

== 2016 ==
The second day of the 2016 edition, headlined by Muse, reportedly drew an estimated record breaking attendance of around 30,000 people.

| 8 July 2016 | 23 July 2016 |
| Editors; James; Dimitri Vegas & Like Mike; Crystal Castles; Velix; Σtella | Muse; UNKLE Live; Temples; Ilia Darlin |

== 2017 ==
| 24 June 2017 | 14 July 2017 |
| The Killers; The Kills; Circa Waves; Deaf Radio | Kasabian; The Jesus and Mary Chain; Peter Hook and The Light of Montreal; Black Hat Bones |

== 2018 ==
23 June 2018

Nick Cave & the Bad Seeds
Editors
Wolf Alice
Protomartyr
Jack Heart

== 2019 ==
17 July 2019

The Cure
Michael Kiwanuka
Ride
Khruangbin
The Steams

== 2020 ==
The 2020 edition of the festival was cancelled due to the COVID-19 pandemic.

| 5 June 2020 | 13 July 2020 |
| Red Hot Chili Peppers; The Hives; Nothing but Thieves | Foals |

== 2021 ==
The 2021 edition of the festival was cancelled due to the COVID-19 pandemic.

26 June 2021

Red Hot Chili Peppers

== 2022 ==
The 2022 edition of the festival marks its return after 2 years of cancellations due to COVID-19 pandemic restrictions. It was the first time since 2011 where the festival didn't take place at Plateia Nerou. The chosen venue was Telekom Athens Center P5.

29 June 2022

Muse
Yungblud
Nothing but Thieves
Danai Nielsen

== 2023 ==
The 2023 edition of Ejekt is the final one to be held at Plateia Nerou.

2 July 2023

Florence + the Machine
Editors
Warpaint
Goat Girl
Royal Arch

== 2024 ==
For their 20 years anniversary, the 2024 edition of Ejekt Festival was a record breaking one. It was its biggest edition up to that point and for the first time they introduced a 3 consecutive days line up. It was also the most attended edition combined. Last but not least, the Festival took place at its new home, Telekom Athens Center P5.

| 22 July 2024 | 23 July 2024 | 24 July 2024 |
| Korn; Spiritbox; Loathe; Planet of Zeus | Måneskin; Palaye Royale; Alice Merton; The Bonnie Nettles | Bring Me the Horizon; Neck Deep; Bury Tomorrow; SixForNine |

== 2025 ==
The 2025 edition included Green Day's first performance in Greece, reportedly attended by approximately 40,000 people.

| 6 July 2025 | 9 July 2025 |
| Green Day; The Kooks; Inhaler; The Overjoyed | Louis Tomlinson; Sevdaliza; Only the Poets; Nieve Ella |

== 2026 ==
In the 2026 edition, Ejekt returned with a two consecutive dates format.

| 14 July 2026 | 15 July 2026 |
| Florence + the Machine; Suede; Holly Humberstone; Elena Leoni | The Cure; Nothing but Thieves; Matt Berninger |

== 2027 ==
Ejekt announced its return in 2027 through their social media page on October 30th, 2027 with the first announcement pending in the first week of November.

On 16 November 2026, Ejekt announced Foo Fighters as headliners. This will be the first ever tour concert by the band in Greece.

On 18 November 2026, the festival announced Teddy Swims as headliner for their second day on July 4th, 2027. This will also be Swims' debut performance in Greece.

| 2 July 2027 | 4 July 2027 |
| Foo Fighters; Architects; Frenzee | Teddy Swims + more tba |
