= Psychedelic music =

Range of popular music styles and genres

Psychedelic music (sometimes called psychedelia) is a wide range of popular music styles and genres influenced by 1960s psychedelia, a subculture of people who used psychedelic drugs such as DMT, LSD, mescaline, and psilocybin mushrooms, to experience synesthesia and altered states of consciousness. Psychedelic music may also aim to enhance the experience of using these drugs and has been found to have a significant influence on psychedelic therapy.

Psychedelia embraces visual art, movies, and literature, as well as music. Psychedelic music emerged during the 1960s among folk and rock bands in the United States and the United Kingdom, creating the subgenres of psychedelic folk, psychedelic rock, acid rock, and psychedelic pop before declining in the early 1970s. Numerous spiritual successors followed in the ensuing decades, including progressive rock, krautrock, and heavy metal. Since the 1970s, revivals have included psychedelic funk, neo-psychedelia, and stoner rock as well as psychedelic electronic music genres such as acid house, trance music, and new rave.

== Characteristics ==
"Psychedelic" as an adjective is often used loosely, with many acts playing in a variety of styles. Acknowledging this, author Michael Hicks explains:

To understand what makes music stylistically "psychedelic," one should consider three fundamental effects of LSD: dechronicization, depersonalization, and dynamization. Dechronicization permits the drug user to move outside of conventional perceptions of time. Depersonalization allows the user to lose the self and gain an "awareness of undifferentiated unity." Dynamization, as [Timothy] Leary wrote, makes everything from floors to lamps seem to bend, as "familiar forms dissolve into moving, dancing structures"... Music that is truly "psychedelic" mimics these three effects.

Flanging example
A short sample followed by two flanging versions

Phaser effect example
Unprocessed organ followed by different phasing effects

A number of features are signatures of psychedelic music. Eastern instrumentation, with a particular fondness for the sitar and tabla, is common. Songs often have more disjunctive song structures, key and time signature changes, modal melodies, and drones than contemporary pop music. Surreal, whimsical, esoterically or literary-inspired lyrics are often used. There is often a strong emphasis on extended instrumental segments or jams. There is a strong keyboard presence, in the 1960s especially, using electronic organs, harpsichords, or the Mellotron, an early tape-driven 'sampler' keyboard.

Elaborate studio effects are often used, such as backwards tapes, panning the music from one side to another of the stereo track, using the "swooshing" sound of electronic phasing, long delay loops and extreme reverb. In the 1960s there was a use of electronic instruments such as early synthesizers and the theremin. Later forms of electronic psychedelia also employed repetitive computer-generated beats.

== 1960s: Original psychedelic era ==
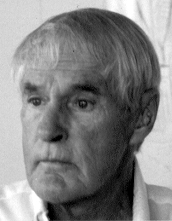
Timothy Leary, a major advocate of the use of LSD in the 1960s, photographed in 1989

=== Early psychedelia ===
From the second half of the 1950s, Beat Generation writers like William Burroughs, Jack Kerouac and Allen Ginsberg wrote about and took drugs, including cannabis and Benzedrine, raising awareness and helping to popularise their use. In the early 1960s the use of LSD and other psychedelics was advocated by new proponents of consciousness expansion such as Timothy Leary, Alan Watts, Aldous Huxley and Arthur Koestler, and, according to Laurence Veysey, they profoundly influenced the thinking of the new generation of youth.

The psychedelic lifestyle had already developed in California, particularly in San Francisco, by the mid-1960s, with the first major underground LSD factory established by Owsley Stanley. From 1964, the Merry Pranksters, a loose group that developed around novelist Ken Kesey, sponsored the Acid Tests, a series of events involving the taking of LSD (supplied by Stanley), accompanied by light shows, film projection and discordant, improvised music by the Grateful Dead (financed by Stanley), then known as the Warlocks, known as the psychedelic symphony. The Pranksters helped popularise LSD use, through their road trips across America in a psychedelically decorated converted school bus, which involved distributing the drug and meeting with major figures of the beat movement, and through publications about their activities such as Tom Wolfe's The Electric Kool-Aid Acid Test in 1968.

San Francisco had an emerging music scene of folk clubs, coffee houses and independent radio stations that catered to the population of students at nearby Berkeley and the free thinkers that had gravitated to the city. There was already a culture of drug use among jazz and blues musicians, and in the early 1960s use of drugs including cannabis, peyote, mescaline and LSD began to grow among folk and rock musicians. The earliest known usage of the term "psychedelic" in music was by the New York-based folk group The Holy Modal Rounders on their version of Lead Belly's "Hesitation Blues" in 1964. Folk/avant-garde guitarist John Fahey recorded several songs in the early 1960s experimented with unusual recording techniques, including backwards tapes, and novel instrumental accompaniment including flute and sitar. His nineteen-minute "The Great San Bernardino Birthday Party" "anticipated elements of psychedelia with its nervy improvisations and odd guitar tunings". Similarly, folk guitarist Sandy Bull's early work "incorporated elements of folk, jazz, and Indian and Arabic-influenced dronish modes". His 1963 album Fantasias for Guitar and Banjo explores various styles and "could also be accurately described as one of the very first psychedelic records".

The first mention of LSD on a rock record was the Gamblers' 1960 surf instrumental "LSD 25". In 1965, New York band the Fugs would make mention of LSD on their song "I Couldn't Get High". In May 1965, drummer John Densmore joined guitarist Robby Krieger in a band called the Psychedelic Rangers which was formed in Los Angeles, California. The duo took LSD legally and wrote only two songs, one of them called "Paranoia". The group was one of the earliest instances of a band referring to themselves as "psychedelic". However, John Townley and David Blue formed a short-lived group of the same name that same year in New York. Townley compared the band to the Holy Modal Rounders and had also been roommates with Steve Weber. Densmore and Krieger later joined the Doors in late 1965. In January 1966, Texan band the 13th Floor Elevators would coin the term "psychedelic rock" on business cards which contained an image of a third eye. That same year, the band released The Psychedelic Sounds of the 13th Floor Elevators in October, which was later recognized as the earliest known use of the term "psychedelic" in an album title. This was followed by New York acts the Deep and Blues Magoos releasing Psychedelic Moods and Psychedelic Lollipop in November.

=== Peak era and decline ===
Soon musicians began to refer (at first indirectly, and later explicitly) to the drug and attempted to recreate or reflect the experience of taking LSD in their music, just as it was reflected in psychedelic art, literature and film. This trend ran in parallel in both America and Britain and as part of the interconnected folk and rock scenes. As pop music began incorporating psychedelic sounds, the genre emerged as a mainstream and commercial force. Psychedelic rock reached its peak in the last years of the decade. From 1967 to 1968, it was the prevailing sound of rock music, either in the whimsical British variant, or the harder American West Coast acid rock. In America, the 1967 Summer of Love was prefaced by the Human Be-In event and reached its peak at the Monterey International Pop Festival. These trends climaxed in the 1969 Woodstock Festival, which saw performances by most of the major psychedelic acts, including Jimi Hendrix, Janis Joplin, Jefferson Airplane and Santana.

By the end of the 1960s, the trend of exploring psychedelia in music was largely in retreat. LSD was declared illegal in the United States and the United Kingdom in 1966. The linking of the murders of Sharon Tate and Leno and Rosemary LaBianca by the Manson Family to Beatles songs such as "Helter Skelter" contributed to an anti-hippie backlash. The Altamont Free Concert in California, headlined by the Rolling Stones and Jefferson Airplane on December 6, 1969, did not turn out to be a positive milestone in the psychedelic music scene, as was anticipated; instead, it became notorious for the fatal stabbing of a black teenager Meredith Hunter by Hells Angels security guards.

== Revivals and successors ==
=== Rock and pop ===
==== Post-psychedelic era: Progressive rock and hard rock ====
By the end of the 1960s, many rock musicians had returned to the rootsy sources of rock and roll's origins, leading to what Barney Hoskyns called a "retrogressive, post-psychedelic music" development; he cited the country rock and blues/soul-inspired rock of the Rolling Stones, The Band, Delaney & Bonnie, Van Morrison, and Leon Russell. At the same time, a more avant-garde development came with the contingent of artists associated with Frank Zappa, including The Mothers of Invention, Captain Beefheart, Wild Man Fischer, The GTOs, and Alice Cooper.

According to musicologist Frank Hoffman, post-psychedelic hard rock emerged from the varied rock scene, distinguished by more "cinematic guitar stylings and evocative lyric imagery", as in the music of Led Zeppelin, Black Sabbath, and Robin Trower. Music scholar Edward Macan notes that the "post-psychedelic hard rock/heavy metal styles" that emerged had "a weaker connection to the hippie ethos" and "strongly emphasized the blues progression". Psychedelic rock, with its distorted guitar sound, extended solos, and adventurous compositions, had been an important bridge between blues-oriented rock and the later emergence of metal. Two former guitarists with the Yardbirds, Jeff Beck and Jimmy Page, moved on to form key acts in the new blues rock-heavy metal genre, The Jeff Beck Group and Led Zeppelin, respectively. Other major pioneers of the heavy metal genre had begun as blues-based psychedelic bands, including Black Sabbath, Deep Purple, Judas Priest and UFO.

According to American academic Christophe Den Tandt, many musicians during the post-psychedelic era adopted a stricter sense of professionalism and elements of classical music, as evinced by the concept albums of Pink Floyd and the virtuosic instrumentation of Emerson, Lake and Palmer and Yes. "Early-1970s post-psychedelic rock was hatched in small or medium-sized structures", he adds, naming record labels such as Virgin Records, Island Records, and Obscure Records. Many of the British musicians and bands that had embraced psychedelia moved into creating the progressive rock genre in the 1970s. King Crimson's album In the Court of the Crimson King (1969) has been seen as an important link between psychedelia and progressive rock. While some bands such as Hawkwind maintained an explicitly psychedelic course into the 1970s, most bands dropped the psychedelic elements in favour of embarking on wider experimentation. As German bands from the psychedelic movement moved away from their psychedelic roots and placed increasing emphasis on electronic instrumentation, these groups, including Kraftwerk, Tangerine Dream, Can and Faust, developed a distinctive brand of electronic rock, known as kosmische musik, or in the British press as "Krautrock". Their adoption of electronic synthesisers, along with the musical styles explored by Brian Eno in his keyboard playing with Roxy Music, had a major influence on subsequent development of electronic rock. The incorporation of jazz styles into the music of bands like Soft Machine and Can, also contributed to the development of the emerging jazz rock sound of bands such as Colosseum.

Another development of the post-psychedelic era was more freedom with marketing of the artist and their records, such as with album artwork. Tandt identifies a recording artist's preference for anonymity in the economic market through the design of record sleeves having limited information about the musician or the record; he cites Pink Floyd's early 1970s albums, the Beatles' 1968 album (unofficially known as The White Album), and Led Zeppelin's 1971 album, for which "there is up to this day no consensus about the title". According to him, post-psychedelic musicians like Brian Eno and Robert Fripp "explicitly advocated" this disconnection between the artist and their work or stardom. "In so doing", he adds, "they laid the foundations for a central tendency of post-punk" in the late 1970s, as evinced by the first four albums by The Cure (featuring blurry photographs of the band members) and Factory Records' dark-colored covers with serial numbers.

By the mid-1970s, post-psychedelic music's emphasis on musicianship had "laid itself bare to an iconoclastic rebellion", as Tandt described: "Mid-1970s punk rock, with its genuine or feigned ethos of musical crudeness, reinscribed rock's autonomy through cultural means opposite to those developed 10 years earlier." Along with the psychedelic, folk rock, and British rhythm and blues styles that preceded it, the music of the post-psychedelic era later became associated with the classic rock category.

Stoner rock, also known as stoner metal or stoner doom, is a rock music fusion genre that combines elements of heavy metal or doom metal (or both) with psychedelic rock and acid rock. The name references cannabis consumption. The term desert rock is often used interchangeably with the term "stoner rock" to describe this genre; however, not all stoner rock bands would fall under the descriptor of "desert rock". Stoner rock is typically slow-to-mid tempo and features a heavily distorted, groove-laden bass-heavy sound, melodic vocals, and "retro" production. The genre emerged during the early 1990s and was pioneered foremost by Monster Magnet and the California bands Fu Manchu, Kyuss and Sleep.

==== Post-punk, indie rock and alternative rock ====
Neo-psychedelia (or "acid punk") is a diverse style of music that originated in the 1970s as an outgrowth of the British post-punk scene. Its practitioners drew from the unusual sounds of 1960s psychedelic music, either updating or copying the approaches from that era. Neo-psychedelia may include forays into psychedelic pop, jangly guitar rock, heavily distorted free-form jams, or recording experiments. Some of the scene's bands, including the Soft Boys, the Teardrop Explodes, and Echo & the Bunnymen, became major figures of neo-psychedelia. The early 1980s Paisley Underground movement followed neo-psychedelia. Originating in Los Angeles, the movement saw a number of young bands who were influenced by the psychedelia of the late 1960s and all took different elements of it. The term "Paisley Underground" was later expanded to include others from outside the city.

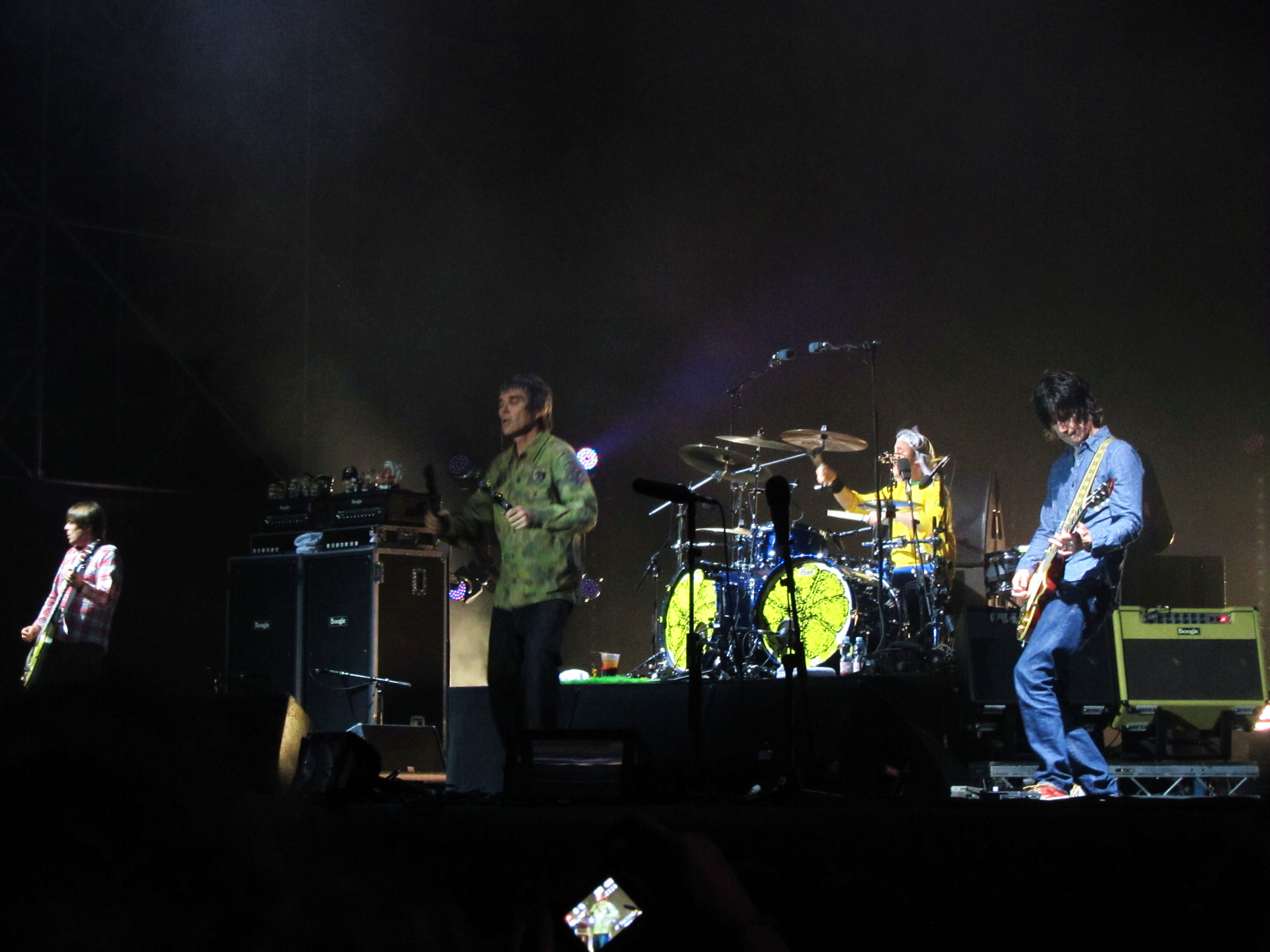
The Stone Roses in concert in Milan in 2012

Madchester was a music and cultural scene that developed in the Manchester area of North West England in the late 1980s, in which artists merged alternative rock with acid house and dance culture as well as other sources, including psychedelic music and 1960s pop. The label was popularised by the British music press in the early 1990s, and its most famous groups include the Stone Roses, Happy Mondays, Inspiral Carpets, the Charlatans and 808 State. The rave-influenced scene is widely seen as heavily influenced by drugs, especially ecstasy (MDMA). At that time, the Haçienda nightclub, co-owned by members of New Order, was a major catalyst for the distinctive musical ethos in the city that was called the Second Summer of Love. Screamadelica is the third studio album by Scottish rock band Primal Scream released in 1991. The album marked a significant departure from the band's early indie rock sound, drawing inspiration from the blossoming house music scene and associated drugs such as LSD and MDMA. It won the first Mercury Music Prize in 1992, and has sold over three million copies worldwide.

AllMusic states: "Aside from the early-'80s Paisley Underground movement and the Elephant 6 collective of the late 1990s, most subsequent neo-psychedelia came from isolated eccentrics and revivalists, not cohesive scenes." They go on to cite what they consider some of the more prominent artists: the Church, Nick Saloman's Bevis Frond, Spacemen 3, Robyn Hitchcock, Mercury Rev, the Flaming Lips, and Super Furry Animals. According to Treblezine's Jeff Telrich: "Primal Scream made [neo-psychedelia] dancefloor ready. The Flaming Lips and Spiritualized took it to orchestral realms. And Animal Collective—well, they kinda did their own thing."

==== Hypnagogic pop, post-noise, chillwave, and glo-fi ====
The Atlantic writer Llewellyn Hinkes Jones identified a variety of music styles from the 2000s characterized by mellow beats, vintage synthesizers, and lo-fi melodies, including chillwave, glo-fi, and hypnagogic pop. These three terms were described as interchangeable by the Quietus, along with other terms "dream-beat" and "hipster-gogic pop." Altogether, they may be viewed as a type of synth-based psychedelic music.

The term "chillwave" was coined in July 2009 on the Hipster Runoff blog by Carles (the pseudonym used by the blog's author) on his accompanying "blog radio" show of the same name. Carles invented the genre name for a host of similarly sounding up-and-coming bands. In August 2009, "hypnagogic pop" was coined by journalist David Keenan to refer to a developing trend of 2000s lo-fi and post-noise music in which artists from varied backgrounds began to engage with elements of cultural nostalgia, childhood memory, and outdated recording technology.

By 2010, albums by Ariel Pink and Neon Indian were regularly hailed by publications like Pitchfork and The Wire. The terms "hypnagogic pop", "chillwave", and "glo-fi" were soon adopted to describe the evolving sound of such artists, a number of which had songs of considerable success within independent music circles. Originally, it was common for the three terms to be used interchangeably, but chillwave later distinguished itself as a combination of dream pop, new age, muzak, and synth-pop. A 2009 review by Pitchfork's Marc Hogan for Neon Indian's album Psychic Chasms referenced "dream-beat", "chillwave", "glo-fi", "hypnagogic pop", and "hipster-gogic pop" as interchangeable terms for "psychedelic music that's generally one or all of the following: synth-based, homemade-sounding, 80s-referencing, cassette-oriented, sun-baked, laid-back, warped, hazy, emotionally distant, slightly out of focus."

=== Funk, soul, and hip hop ===
Following the late 1960s work of Jimi Hendrix, psychedelia began to have a widespread impact on African American musicians. Black funk artists such as Sly and the Family Stone borrowed techniques from psychedelic rock music, including wah pedals, fuzz boxes, echo chambers, and vocal distorters, as well as elements of blues rock and jazz. In the following years, groups such as Parliament-Funkadelic continued this sensibility, employing synthesizers and rock-oriented guitar work into open-ended funk jams. Producer Norman Whitfield would draw on this sound on popular Motown recordings such as the Temptations' "Cloud Nine" (1968) and Marvin Gaye's "I Heard It Through the Grapevine" (1969).

Influenced by the civil rights movement, psychedelic soul had a darker and more political edge than much psychedelic rock. Psychedelic soul was pioneered by Sly and the Family Stone with songs like ""I Want to Take You Higher" (1969), and The Temptations with "Cloud Nine", "Runaway Child, Running Wild" (1969) and "Psychedelic Shack" (1969).

Psychedelic rap is a microgenre which fuses hip hop music with psychedelia. Pioneers included New York's Native Tongues collective, headlined by De La Soul, Jungle Brothers and A Tribe Called Quest, and Shock G. Though the "trip" in trip hop was more linked to dub music than psychedelia, the genre combined psychedelic rock with hip hop.

==== Cloud rap ====
Cloud rap is a subgenre of rap that has several sonic characteristics of trap music and is known for its hazy, dreamlike and relaxed production style. Rapper Lil B and producer Clams Casino have been identified as the early pioneers of the style. The term "cloud rap" is derived from its internet origins and ethereal style.

=== Electronic ===
==== House, techno, and trance ====
The rave scene emphasized house, acid house and techno. The rave genre "hardcore" first appeared amongst the UK acid movement during the late 1980s at warehouse parties and other underground venues, as well as on UK pirate radio stations. The genre would develop into oldschool hardcore, which led to newer forms of rave music such as drum and bass and 2-step, as well as other hardcore techno genres, such as gabber, hardstyle and happy hardcore. In the late 1980s, rave culture began to filter through from English expatriates and disc jockeys who would visit Continental Europe. American raves began in the 1990s in New York City.

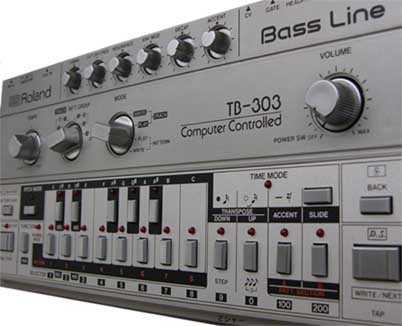
A Roland TB-303 Bassline sequencer

Acid house originated in the mid-1980s in the house music style of Chicago DJs like DJ Pierre, Adonis, Farley Jackmaster Funk and Phuture, the last of which coined the term on his "Acid Tracks" (1987). It mixed elements of house with the "squelchy" sounds and deep basslines produced by the Roland TB-303 synthesizer. As singles began to reach the UK the sound was re-created, beginning in small warehouse parties held in London in 1986–87. During 1988 in the Second Summer of Love it hit the mainstream as thousands of clubgoers travelled to mass raves. The genre then began to penetrate the British pop charts with hits for M/A/R/R/S, S'Express, and Technotronic by the early 1990s, before giving way to the popularity of trance music.

Trance music originated in the German techno and hardcore scenes of the early 1990s. It emphasized brief and repeated synthesizer lines with minimal rhythmic changes and occasional synthesizer atmospherics, with the aim of putting listeners into a trance-like state. A writer for Billboard magazine writes, "Trance music is perhaps best described as a mixture of 70s disco and 60s psychedelia". Derived from acid house and techno music, it developed in Germany and the Netherlands with singles including "Energy Flash" by Joey Beltram and "The Ravesignal" by CJ Bolland. This was followed by releases by Robert Leiner, Sun Electric, Aphex Twin and most influentially the techno-trance released by the Harthouse label, including the much emulated "Acperience 1" (1992) by duo Hardfloor. Having gained some popularity in the UK in the early 1990s it was eclipsed by the appearance of new genres of electronic music such as trip hop and jungle, before taking off again towards the end of the decade and beginning to dominate the clubs. It soon began to fragment into a number of subgenres, including progressive trance, acid trance, goa trance, psychedelic trance, hard trance and uplifting trance.

In the 2010s, artists such as Bassnectar, Tipper and Pretty Lights dominated the more mainstream psychedelic cultures. "Raves" became much larger and grew to mainstream appeal.

==== New rave ====
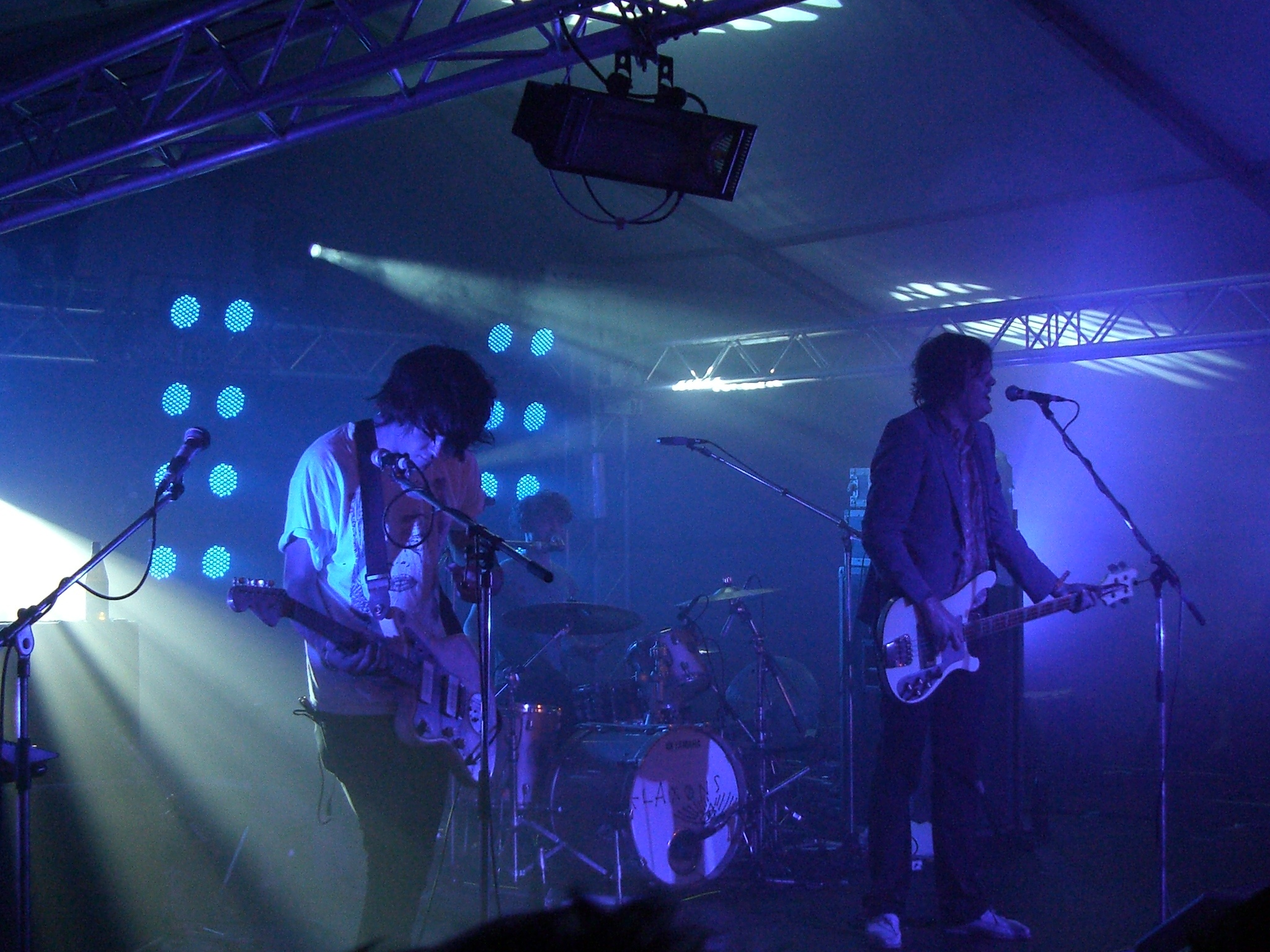
New rave band the Klaxons in concert in 2007

In Britain in the 2000s (decade), the combination of indie rock with dance-punk was dubbed "new rave" in publicity for Klaxons, and the term was picked up and applied by the NME to a number of bands. It formed a scene with a similar visual aesthetic to earlier rave music, emphasizing visual effects: glowsticks, neon and other lights were common, and followers of the scene often dressed in extremely bright and fluorescent coloured clothing.

==== Synthedelia ====
Synthedelia is a fusion genre coined by music journalist Simon Reynolds to describe a fusion of psychedelia and early electronic music that was popular in the American West Coast and East Coast psychedelic scene in the mid-to late 1960s. Originally pioneered by the New York-based psychedelic rock band Lothar and the Hand People who formed in 1965, they have been considered the first ever rock band to make use of an electronic instrument, particularly the theremin. Other notable acts include Silver Apples, the United States of America, White Noise, Fifty Foot Hose, Intersystems, Beaver & Krause and Syrinx.

==== Music used for psychedelic-assisted therapy ====
Set and setting are critical in the design of psychiatric facilities and modalities of psychedelic-assisted psychotherapies. Research has shown that a curated music playlist can be part of a favourable setting.

== See also ==
- List of psychedelic folk artists
- List of psychedelic pop artists
- List of psychedelic rock artists
- Freak Scene Musicians
