= Royal Arch (band) =

Greek post-punk band

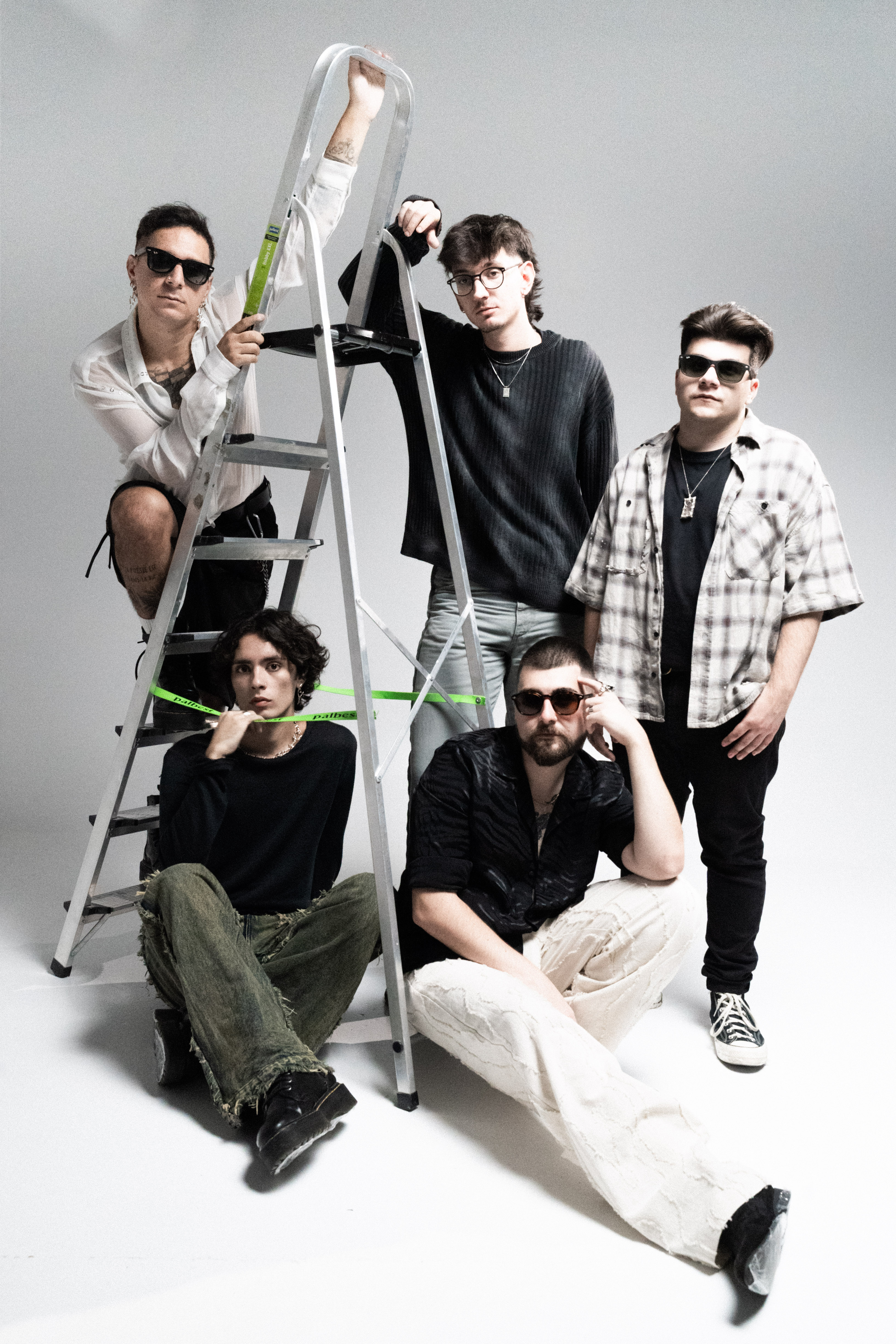
- Royal Arch original line up.: From left top row: Elias, Vassilis, Elias. Bottom row: Orestis, Nikos

Background information
- Origin: Athens, Greece
- Genres: Post-punk; Shoegaze; Indie rock; Alternative rock
- Years active: 2020–present
- Members: Elias Masri; Nick Kokkinos; Vassilis Dousis; Orestis Loukas; Elias Kokkinos
- Website: royalarchofficial.bandcamp.com

Royal Arch are a Greek post-punk, shoegaze and indie rock band from Athens. The band was formed in 2020 and consists of Elias Masri on vocals, Nick Kokkinos on guitar, Vassilis Dousis on guitar, Orestis Loukas on bass and Elias Kokkinos on drums. Their releases include the single "La Nuit", the 7-inch release La Nuit / Road To The Light, and the 2025 debut album Love & Terror.

== History ==
Royal Arch were formed in Athens in 2020. According to early coverage of the band, the members met while attending high school in Piraeus, before vocalist Elias Masri joined the group in 2020. The band was described by Rock Attitude as a five-piece group with shoegaze and post-punk elements.

The band released their debut single "La Nuit" in December 2021. In February 2022, "La Nuit" and "Road To The Light" were released as La Nuit / Road To The Light through Make Me Happy Records.

In June 2022, Royal Arch appeared at Release Athens Festival on the same day as Nick Cave and the Bad Seeds, Mogwai, Fontaines D.C. and Sugar for the Pill. Release Athens described Royal Arch and Sugar for the Pill as two of the best new bands of the local scene.

In March 2023, the band released "Why Don’t You? (Let It All Go)". The Spill Magazine described the track as a melodic indie rock song with vocals, a driving drumbeat, basslines and guitar melodies.

In June 2023, Royal Arch released "Twenty Three", which was accompanied by a visualizer created by Bewild Brother. Rocking.gr described the song as melodic indie rock with new wave and post-punk influences.

Royal Arch performed at Ejekt Festival 2023, whose line-up included Florence and the Machine, Editors, Warpaint and Goat Girl. News 24/7 reported that Editors and Royal Arch were added to the Florence and the Machine day of the festival, with Royal Arch representing the domestic indie-rock scene.

The band released their debut studio album, Love & Terror, on 11 April 2025. The album was recorded and mixed by Alex Bolpasis at Suono Studio, produced by Bolpasis and Royal Arch, and mastered by Nick Townsend at Infrasonic Sound in Los Angeles. Afternoiz also reported that Bolpasis produced the album, Townsend handled mastering, and Bewild Brother created the artwork.

== Musical style ==
Royal Arch's music has been described as post-punk, shoegaze, indie rock and alternative rock. Afternoiz described Love & Terror as drawing from post-punk, indie rock and the wider alternative sound, and noted the album's cinematic approach. Rocking.gr described the band's sound as post-punk with a polished, British-influenced character and emphasis on nostalgic melody.

== Reception ==
Love & Terror received coverage from Greek music publications after its release. Rocking.gr described the album as a promising debut and wrote that Royal Arch showed maturity within the domestic post-punk scene. Afternoiz described the album as an eight-track release with post-punk, indie rock and alternative influences, and wrote that the songs are connected in a cinematic way.

== Members ==
- Elias Masri – vocals
- Nick Kokkinos – guitar
- Vassilis Dousis – guitar
- Orestis Loukas – bass
- Elias Kokkinos – drums

== Discography ==
=== Studio albums ===
- Love & Terror (2025)

=== Singles and EPs ===
- "La Nuit" (2021)
- La Nuit / Road To The Light (2022)
- "Why Don’t You? (Let It All Go)" (2023)
- "Twenty Three" (2023)
