= List of psychedelic pop artists =

The following is a list of artists considered to be general purveyors of the psychedelic pop genre.

== Psychedelic era ==
- The Avant-Garde
- The Beach Boys
- The Beatles
- Bee Gees (1960s work)
- Chamaeleon Church
- Donovan
- Edwards Hand
- The Electric Prunes
- The End
- Tommy James
- Kaleidoscope
- Marmalade
- The Neon Philharmonic
- Geoff Nicholls
- The Nova Local
- Orange Bicycle
- Paul Revere & the Raiders
- Pink Floyd
- Plastic Penny
- The Rainy Daze
- Rotary Connection
- Sagittarius
- The Savage Rose
- The Spike Drivers
- Skip Bifferty
- Strawberry Alarm Clock
- Traffic (early work)
- The Turtles
- Underground Sunshine
- World of Oz
- Zager and Evans

== Later years ==
- Animal Collective
- Baby Lemonade
- The Barracudas
- Cardiacs
- The Dream Syndicate
- The Flaming Lips
- Gorky's Zygotic Mynci
- The Growlers
- Guards
- The Happy Bullets
- Jellyfish
- The Junipers
- Jasper Leach
- Lush
- Mazie
- Mercury Rev
- Mild High Club
- Connan Mockasin
- Pond
- Prince Rama
- Quilt
- Rain Parade
- The Rollo Treadway
- Shrubbies
- Simian
- Tim Smith
- Sticky Fingers
- Super Furry Animals
- Tame Impala
- Temples
- The Three O'Clock
- True West
- Unknown Mortal Orchestra
- Vows
- Yura Yura Teikoku
- The Olivia Tremor Control
- Candy Claws
- of Montreal
- Deerhunter
- XTC
- MGMT
- Black Moth Super Rainbow

== See also ==
- List of psychedelic folk artists
- List of psychedelic rock artists

== Bibliography ==
- Clarke, Donald (1998). The Penguin Encyclopedia of Popular Music. Penguin Books. ISBN 978-0-1405-1370-7.
- DeRogatis, Jim (2003). Turn On Your Mind: Four Decades of Great Psychedelic Rock. Hal Leonard Corporation. ISBN 0-634-05548-8.
- DeRogatis, Jim (2006). Staring at Sound: The True Story of Oklahoma's Fabulous Flaming Lips. Broadway Books. ISBN 978-0-7679-2140-4.
- Mojo (2007). Irvin, Jim (ed.). The Mojo Collection: The Ultimate Music Companion (4th ed.). Canongate Books. ISBN 978-1-8419-5973-3.
- Strong, Martin Charles; Griffin, Brendon (2008). Lights, camera, sound tracks. Canongate. ISBN 978-1-84767-003-8.
- George-Warren, Holly; Romanowski, Patricia, eds. (2001). The Rolling Stone Encyclopedia of Rock & Roll (3rd ed.). Fireside. ISBN 0-7432-9201-4.
