= The Paper Garden =

- Origin: New York City, United States
- Genres: Psychedelic rock; psychedelic pop
- Years active: 1967–1969
- Labels: Musicor
- Past members: Joe Arduino; Sandy Napoli; Paul LoGrande; Jimmy Tirella; John Reich

The Paper Garden was an American psychedelic rock band formed in New York City in 1967. After gathering a sizable following in the Northwest, the group recorded their only album, The Paper Garden, in 1968, which promoted several styles ranging from complex orchestration to hard-edged psychedelia. Following its release, the recordings have since become considered one of the more accomplished artistic statements from the psychedelic era.

Formed in 1967, the Paper Garden consisted of members Joe Arduino (bass guitar, vocals), Sandy Napoli (rhythm guitar, keyboards, sitar, vocals), Paul LoGrande (lead guitar, vocals), Jimmy Tirella (drums), and John Reich (keyboards). With varying talents as multi-instrumentalists, three capable singers, and accomplished songwriters in Arduino, Napoli, and LoGrande, the band almost effortlessly was able to expand upon the complex instrumentals found in the Beatles' Revolver and Sgt. Pepper's Lonely Hearts Club Band. The Paper Garden toured all along the Northeast coast, establishing several pockets of followers in local college campuses. In 1968, the group garnered the interest of record producer Geoff Turner, who was working for Aaron Schroeder's New York-based Musicor Records. Under the assumption that the band would record material he heard onstage, Turner signed the Paper Garden to a recording contract, ambitious to produce a group he hoped was on the cutting edge of psychedelia.

Rather than record the material from their live set, the Paper Garden decided to compose a whole new set of ambitious repertory. The album was much more elaborate and expensive to cut than Turner anticipated; however, he ultimately elected to recording it, complete with string orchestra arrangements, contributions by session trumpeter, violinist, and trombonist, and intricate vocal harmonies. Music critic Beverly Patterson, writing for It's Psychedelic Baby! Magazine voices that The Paper Garden album was "Clearly influenced by the psychedelic hoodoo practiced by the Beatles, trickles of the Idle Race, and the Bee Gees, and even the jolly jugband stylings of the Lovin' Spoonful, further arise on 'The Paper Garden Presents,' resulting in a record that’s both playful and progressive". Upon release, The Paper Garden was met with positive reviews, but without a single or major record label to support it, the album was a commercial flop.

The Paper Garden disbanded in 1969, and for a while their album was left to lay in obscurity. However, in 2002, Gear-Fab Records released a remastered version of the album. It has since been followed by more reissues on Relics Records in 2012 and Sundazed Music in 2014. The renewed recognition of The Paper Garden has led many music critics to conclude the album is a well-executed piece from the psychedelic era.

== Discography ==
- The Paper Garden – Musicor, MS #3175 (1968), US
