= List of psychedelic folk artists =

The following is a list of psychedelic folk artists.

== Artists ==
- The Accidental
- Akron/Family
- Animal Collective
- Arborea
- August Born
- Bread, Love and Dreams
- Vashti Bunyan
- Nick Castro
- Circulus
- Circus Maximus
- Cold Sun
- Comus
- Current 93
- Buck Curran
- Richard Dawson
- Alela Diane
- Donovan
- Dr. Strangely Strange
- Espers
- Simon Finn
- Mark Fry
- Globelamp
- Mattias Hellberg & the White Moose
- Heron Oblivion
- Robyn Hitchcock
- The Holy Modal Rounders
- The Incredible String Band
- Jan Dukes de Grey
- Kimbanourke
- Lavender Diamond
- Jasper Leach
- Midlake
- Father John Misty
- Nagisa ni te
- Natural Snow Buildings
- Lee Harvey Osmond
- Pacific Gold
- Pearls Before Swine
- Linda Perhacs
- Sexwitch
- Six Organs of Admittance
- Sleepy Sun
- Snowglobe
- Stealing Sheep
- Meic Stevens
- Summer Hymns
- Trembling Bells
- T. Rex (as Tyrannosaurus Rex)
- The Valerie Project
- Waves
- Dusty Wright
- Dagmar Zuniga

== See also ==
- List of psychedelic pop artists
- List of psychedelic rock artists

== Bibliography ==
- Dimery, Robert (2010). 1001 Songs You Must Hear Before You Die. Cassell. ISBN 978-1-84403-684-4.
- Brackett, Nathan; Hoard, Christian (2004). The New Rolling Stone Album Guide (4th ed.). Fireside. ISBN 0-394-72107-1.
- Larkin, Colin, ed. (2006). Encyclopedia of Popular Music (4th ed.). Oxford University Press. ISBN 978-0-1953-1373-4.
- Partridge, Christopher (2017). "Chapter 27: Psychedelic Music". In Partridge, Christopher; Moberg, Marcus (eds.). The Bloomsbury Handbook of Religion and Popular Music. London: Bloomsbury. pp. 294–305. ISBN 978-1-4742-3735-2.
