= Spirits and the Melchizedek Children =

- Origin: Atlanta, Georgia, United States
- Genres: psychedelic rock, shoegaze
- Years active: 2009–present
- Label: Fallen Arrows
- Members: Jason Elliott, Bryan Fielden, Nathan Sadler
- Past members: Andrew Burnes, Chris Case, Darren Harrison, Craig Henderson, Joe McNeill, Ryan Odom
- Website: www.spiritsatl.com

Spirits and the Melchizedek Children is a psychedelic shoegaze band from Atlanta, GA. They have been described by The A.V. Club as the "Southern Sigur Rós."

== History ==
Spirits and the Melchizedek Children began as the solo acoustic project of Atlanta-based singer-songwriter Jason Elliott. The band went through many iterations before settling on its current lineup. Their first album, We Are Here to Save You! was recorded by Ed Rawls (Black Lips, Those Darlins, Deerhunter) at The Living Room Recording in Atlanta. Their latest album, So Happy, It's Sad was recorded with Ben Price (OutKast, The Hives, Little Tybee ) at Studilaroche in Decatur, GA. The band's music explores themes of alchemy, mystery and the occult.

== Members ==
Current Members

- Jason Elliott — vocals, guitar
- Bryan Fielden — drums
- Nathan Sadler — bass

Former Members

- Andrew Burnes
- Chris Case
- Darren Harrison
- Craig Henderson
- Joe McNeill
- Ryan Odom

== Discography ==
2011 - We Are Here to Save You!

- Released: May 22, 2011

2012 - Look! - Single

- Released: Aug 04, 2012

2013 - Song Bird's Grave / Oscines (Magicicada Remix) - Single

- Released: Nov 09, 2013

2014 - So Happy, It's Sad

- Released: Mar 04, 2014
