= Dagmar Zuniga =

Nicaraguan-American musician

- Born: Dagmar Zuniga; Miami, Florida
- Genre: Psychedelic folk
- Years active: 2019–present
- Label: AD 93

Dagmar Zuniga is a Nicaraguan-American musician based in Brooklyn, New York. She released her debut studio album, in filth your mystery is kingdom / far smile peasant in yellow music in 2025, with it being reissued by AD 93 in 2026.

== Early life ==
Dagmar Zuniga was born in Miami, Florida. Her mother is Nicaraguan and she has a brother. Zuniga first got into music after her mother played Juan Gabriel's "Amor eterno" every morning to get her out of bed; she started a band with other girls at the age of eight. She was gifted a Tascam 424 recorder by her girlfriend at fifteen and began making field recordings accompanied with her vocals and melodies, inspired by Elliott Smith's album Roman Candle.

== Career ==
Zuniga self-released her debut studio album, in filth your mystery is kingdom / far smile peasant in yellow music on January 8, 2025, through Bandcamp. It was written and recorded from 2019 to 2024 in New York, Norway, and Athens, Georgia. For eight months in 2022, she moved to Norway and worked on a farm there. The album contained contributions from Zach Phillips of Fievel Is Glauque and Zuniga's daughter, gaining traction in online circles and catching the attention of Phil Elverum, who Zuniga later opened for. The album was reissued by AD 93 on March 4, 2026. In fall 2026, she began touring with support from Yasuaki Shimizu and also opened for Cate Le Bon and Black Country, New Road.

== Influences and artistry ==
Zuniga's music has been compared to that of Mount Eerie, Grouper, Cindy Lee, Broadcast, Jessica Pratt, Syd Barrett, Sibylle Baier, Maxine Funke, and Vashti Bunyan.

== Discography ==
=== Studio albums ===
Title	Details
in filth your mystery is kingdom / far smile peasant in yellow music	Released: January 8, 2025; Label: Self-released, AD 93 (reissue); Formats: LP, cassette, digital download
