= The High Learys =

Australian musical group

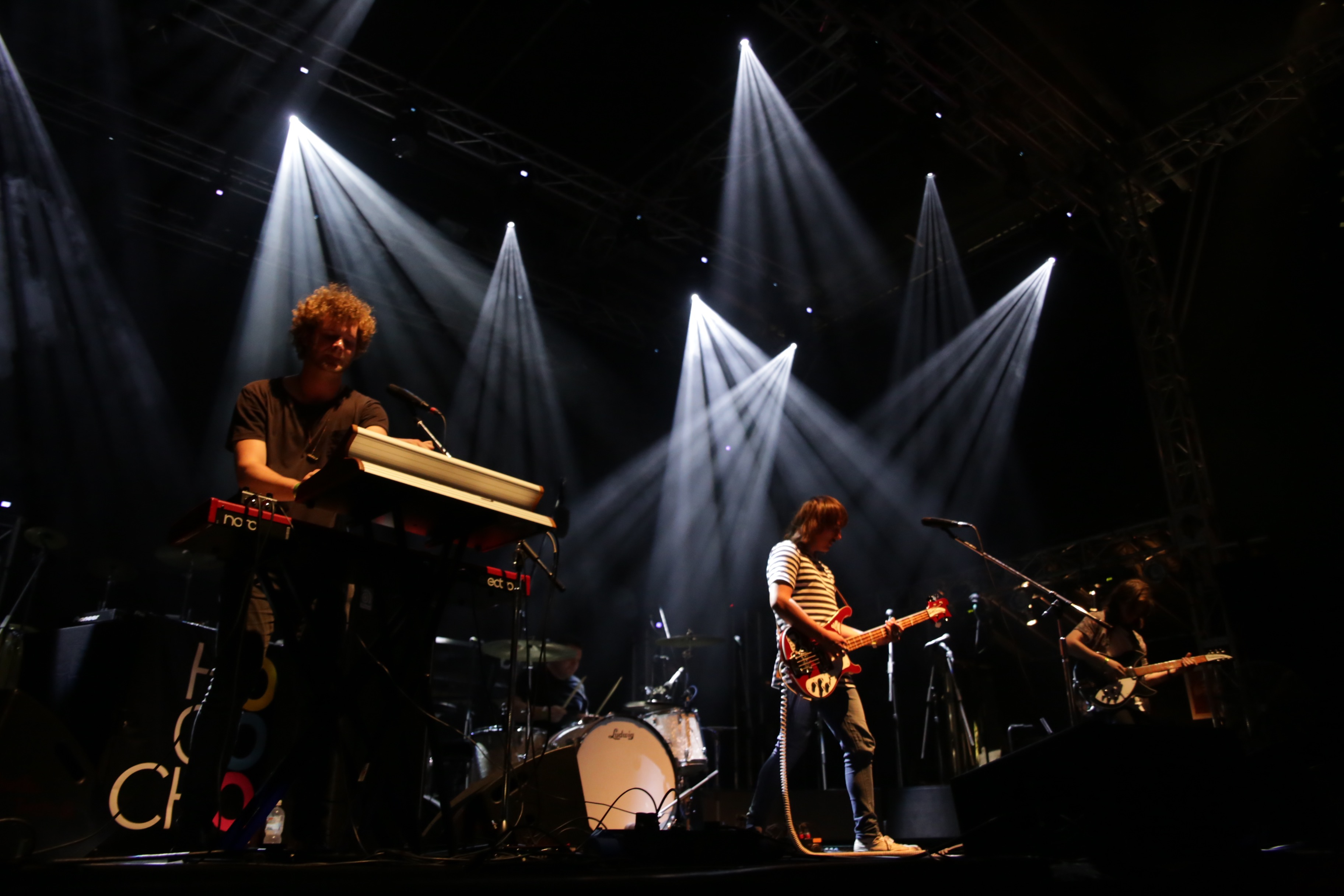
- Performing at the Chevron Festival Gardens in Perth, March 2016

Background information
- Origin: Perth Western Australia
- Genres: Psychedelic rock, indie rock
- Years active: 2011–2017
- Labels: Soundflat, Off the Hip
- Members: Jamie Turner; Michael Nutt; Matt Williams; Mitchell J Benson
- Past members: Adrian MacMillan
- Website: thehighlearys.net

The High Learys are an Australian rock band formed in Perth Western Australia in 2011 by lead singer and bassist Jamie Turner, keyboardist and vocalist Michael Nutt, Guitarist, Matt Williams and drummer Mitchell Benson. They have released one album, and a number of singles. Their single Clear My Mind charted at no. 1 in the AMRAP charts in 2014. They have toured internationally as well as around Australia.

== History ==
The band was formed by cousins Jamie Turner and Matt Williams in late 2011, not long after the band recruited Michael Nutt and former drummer Adrian MacMillan. The band started playing shows around Perth in 2011 and became well regarded for their cover versions of songs from the 1950s and 1960s as well as their original compositions.

In December 2012 the band recorded their debut LP, Here Come The High Learys, at Poons Head Studios in Fremantle with Rob Grant producing, who has worked with the likes of Tame Impala, Miley Cyrus and Lenny Kravitz. The album was released on 22 May 2013 on 12" vinyl through German-based label, Soundflat Records, and by December that year it had reached the highest selling album on the label for the year. Christopher H James of themusic.com.au website felt the group were "Armed with Mod-style mop-tops, catchy, organ-augmented riffs and an infectious go-go beat."

In 2013 the band signed an endorsement with Vox Amplification Australia

Shortly after the release of their debut LP the band went over to Europe to play shows in Germany, France, Italy, Spain and England.

In 2014 the band were featured in a publication The Knights Of Fuzz written by author Timothy Gassen, the book featured articles on artists considered to be notable to the history of Garage Rock. Gassen mentions "It's 60s R&B flavoured garage at its finest, with perfect arrangements and a recording that sounds both vintage authentic and also clean and sophisticated."

In August 2014 the band went back into Poons Head Studios to record their next single, "Clear My Mind", with producer Rob Grant. It was then released on 7" vinyl through Soundflat Records in late October. Shortly after its release the single was used in both a Bose Headphones and Sportscraft commercial. Aliza Caruso caught their gig at The Bakery in early October, where they showcased the single, "Even if the upbeat, energetic, 60s influenced boogie beats of The High Learys isn't your style, you can't deny they know how to put on a damn good a show."

During November and December 2014 the band embarked on a second European tour, playing shows in Germany, Spain and England. Shortly after returning from their tour former drummer Adrian MacMillan was replaced by Mitchell J Benson

With newly recruited drummer Mitchell J Benson the band went back to Poons Head Studios to record their next single "Letters To Alice" in May 2015, which was then released on Pavement Records on 4 September.

In July 2017 the band announced that they would not be continuing as The High Learys and that members Jamie, Mike, Matt and Mitch would be forming a new band under the name MYTHS."

== Band members ==
Current

- Jamie Turner – lead vocals, bass guitar
- Michael Nutt – keyboards, backing vocals
- Matt Williams – lead guitar
- Mitchell J Benson – drums, backing vocals

Past

- Adrian MacMillan – drums

== Discography ==
=== Studio albums ===
- Here Come The High Learys - Soundflat Records (23 May 2013)

=== Singles ===
- "Clear My Mind"/"I'm A Fool For You" - Soundflat Records (23 October 2014)
- "Letters To Alice" - Pavement Records (4 September 2015)
