= Acid rock =

Subgenre of psychedelic rock music

- Stylistic origins: Rock; psychedelia; garage rock; hard rock (Note: Either an influence or derivative according to the sources.); blues; folk rock; psychedelic rock (Note: "Psychedelic rock" may also be a synonym.)
- Cultural origins: Mid-1960s, United States
- Derivative forms: Hard rock; krautrock; heavy metal; progressive rock

Fusion genres
- Stoner metal

Local scenes
- San Francisco Sound

Other topics
- List of artists; acid punk; proto-metal; bad trip

Acid rock is a loosely defined type of rock music that evolved out of the mid-1960s garage punk movement and helped launch the psychedelic subculture. While the term has sometimes been used interchangeably with "psychedelic rock", acid rock also specifically refers to a more musically intense, rawer, or heavier subgenre or sibling of psychedelic rock. Named after lysergic acid diethylamide (LSD), the style is generally defined by heavy, distorted guitars, wah-wah and fuzztone pedals, while often containing lyrics with drug references and long improvised jams.

Compared to other forms of psychedelic rock, acid rock features a harder, louder, heavier, or rawer sound. Much of the style overlaps with 1960s garage rock, proto-metal, and early heavy, blues-based hard rock. It developed mainly from the American West Coast, where groups did not focus on the novelty recording effects and whimsy of British psychedelia or San Francisco's psychedelic folk rock groups; instead, the subgenre emphasized the heavier aspects of West Coast blues rock.

As the movement progressed into the late 1960s and 1970s, elements of acid rock split into two directions, with hard rock and heavy metal on one side and progressive rock on the other. In the 1990s, the stoner metal genre combined acid rock with other hard rock styles such as grunge and doom metal, updating the heavy riffs and long jams found in acid rock and psychedelic-influenced metal.

== Definitions ==
"Acid rock" is loosely defined. In 1969, as the genre was still solidifying, rock journalist Nik Cohn called it a "fairly meaningless phrase that got applied to any group, no matter what its style". The term was originally used to describe the background music for acid trips in underground parties in the 1960s (e.g. the Merry Pranksters' "Acid Tests") and as a catchall term for the more eclectic Haight-Ashbury bands in San Francisco. The Grateful Dead's Jerry Garcia believed that acid rock is music you listen to while under the influence of acid, further stating that there is no real "psychedelic rock" and that it is Indian classical music and some Tibetan music "designed to expand consciousness".

Psychedelia was sometimes referred to as "acid rock". The latter label was applied to a pounding, hard rock variant that evolved out of the mid-1960s garage-punk movement ... When rock began turning back to softer, roots-oriented sounds in late 1968, acid-rock bands mutated into heavy metal acts.

— Frank Hoffman, Encyclopedia of Recorded Sound (2004)

The term has often been deployed interchangeably with "psychedelic rock" or "psychedelia", particularly during the genre's nascence. However, the distinction between the heavier "acid rock" and the more general or inclusive genre of "psychedelic rock" has been well established. According to Per Elias Drabløs, "acid rock is generally considered a subgenre of psychedelic rock", while Steve and Alan Freeman state the two terms are more or less synonymous, and that "what is usually referred to as acid rock is generally the more extreme end of [the psychedelic rock genre]". This would mean psychedelic rock that is heavier, louder, or harder. Additionally, music critics later retroactively labelled the bridge between acid rock, hard rock and early heavy metal acts as "heavy psych".

When defined specifically as a hard rock variant of psychedelia, acid rock is distinguished as having evolved from the 1960s garage punk movement, with many of its bands eventually transforming into heavy metal acts. (Note: Exemplary acts of "garagey" psychedelia include Blues Magoos, the Electric Prunes, and the Music Machine, all of which may fall under the label of acid rock.) Percussionist John Beck defines "acid rock" as synonymous with hard rock and heavy metal. (Note: Hard rock and heavy metal have been described by writer Steve Valdez as evolving from psychedelic rock.) The term eventually encompassed heavy, blues-based hard rock bands. Musicologist Steve Waksman wrote that "the distinction between acid rock, hard rock, and heavy metal can at some point never be more than tenuous".

== Origins and ideology ==
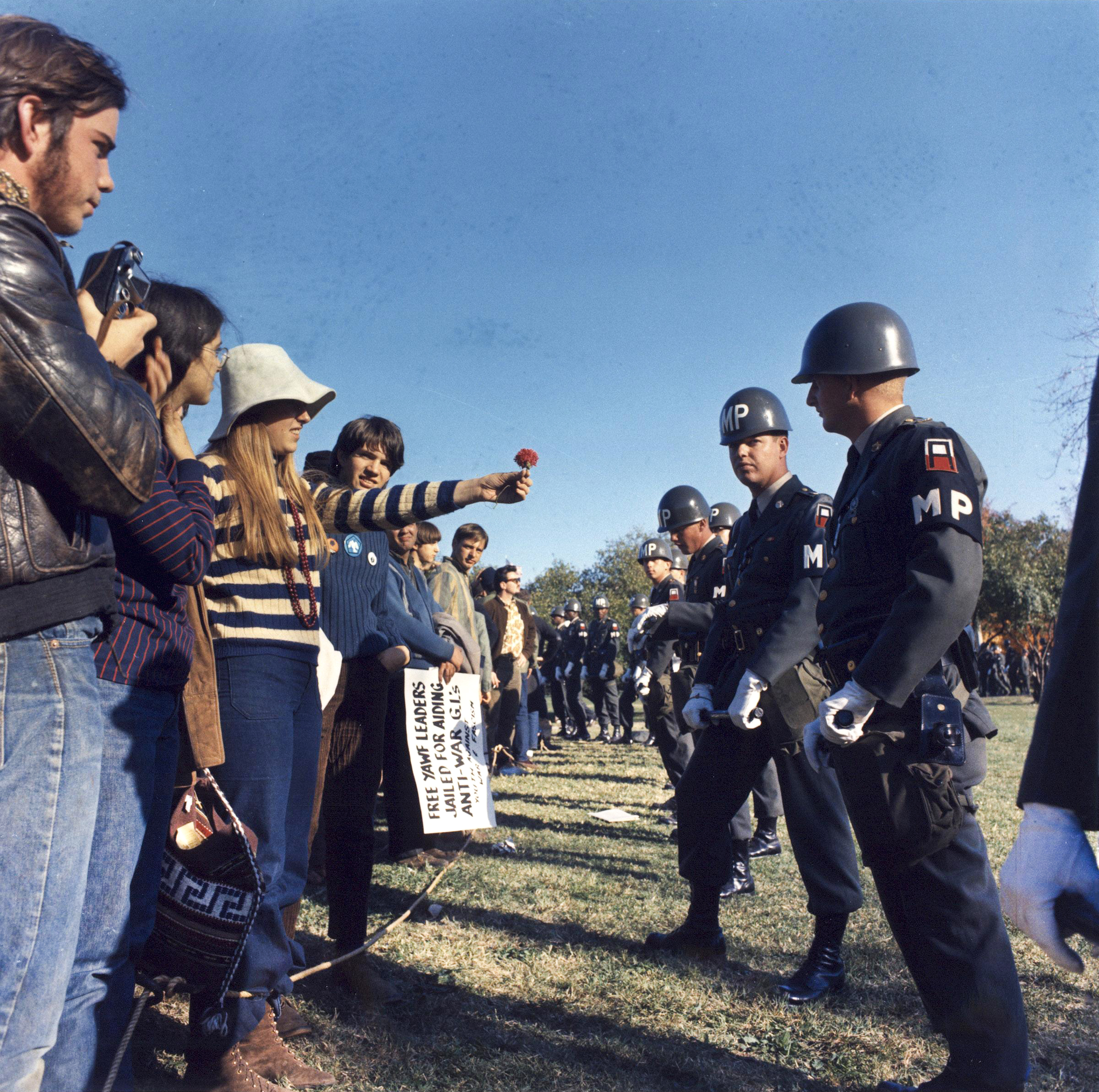
A group of Flower Power demonstrators, 1967

Many bands associated with acid rock aimed to create a youth movement based on love and peace, as an alternative to workaholic capitalist society. David P. Szatmary states, "a legion of rock bands, playing what became known as 'acid rock,' stood in the vanguard of the movement for cultural change." Szatmary also quotes from the San Francisco Oracle, an underground newspaper published between 1966 and 1968, to explain how rock music was perceived at that time and how the acid rock movement emerged: "Rock music is a regenerative and revolutionary art, offering us our first real hope for the future (indeed, for the present)."

When played live at dance clubs, performances were accompanied by psychedelic-themed light shows in order to replicate the visual effects of the acid experience. According to Kevin T. McEneaney, the Grateful Dead "invented" acid rock in front of a crowd of concertgoers in San Jose, California on December 4, 1965, the date of the second Acid Test held by author Ken Kesey. Their stage performance involved the use of strobe lights to reproduce LSD's "surrealistic fragmenting" or "vivid isolating of caught moments". The Acid Test experiments subsequently launched the psychedelic subculture. Author Steve Turner recognises the Beatles' success in conveying an LSD-inspired worldview on their 1966 album Revolver, especially with the track "Tomorrow Never Knows", as having "opened the doors" to acid rock. (Note: Rolling Stone attributes the development of the Los Angeles and San Francisco music scenes, including subsequent releases by the Beach Boys, Love and the Grateful Dead, to the influence of Revolver, particularly the song "She Said She Said".) Former Atlantic Records executive Phillip Rauls recalls: "I was in the music business at the time, and my very first recognition of acid rock ... was, of all people, the Beach Boys and the song 'Good Vibrations' ... That [song's electro theremin] sent so many musicians back to the studio to create this music on acid." (Note: Rauls believed that, at the time, "acid rock" was used to refer to "progressive rock". Writer Vernon Joyson observed flirtations with acid rock in the Beach Boys' albums Pet Sounds (1966) and the unfinished Smile.)

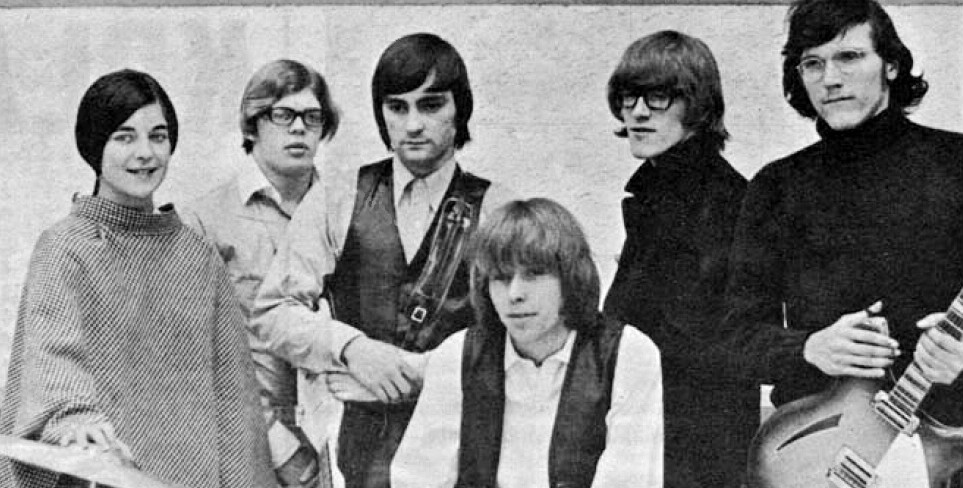
Jefferson Airplane, early 1966

According to Laura Diane Kuhn, the heavier form of psychedelic rock known as acid rock developed from the late 1960s California music scene. The Charlatans were among the first Bay Area acid rock bands. Jefferson Airplane was the first Bay Area acid rock band to sign a major label and achieve mainstream success. By July 1967, Time magazine wrote, "From jukeboxes and transistors across the nation pulses the turned-on sound of acid-rock groups: the Jefferson Airplane, the Doors, Moby Grape". In 1968, Life magazine referred to the Doors as the "kings of acid rock". (Note: Joyson notes that the Doors' acid rock music was markedly different from their San Francisco contemporaries; that the Doors "took the acid experience less literally".)

Other bands credited with creating or laying the foundation for acid rock include garage rock bands such as the 13th Floor Elevators and Count Five. The blues rock group the Paul Butterfield Blues Band are also credited with spawning the harder acid rock sound, and their 1966 instrumental "East-West", with its early use of the extended rock solo, has been described as laying "the roots of psychedelic acid rock" and featuring "much of acid-rock's eventual DNA". The Beatles' June 1967 album Sgt. Pepper's Lonely Hearts Club Band was a major influence on American acid rock groups.

== Development and characteristics ==
=== Garage-psych ===
Originating in the early 1960s, garage rock was a mainly-American movement that involved R&B-inspired garage bands powered by electric guitars and organs. It was mainly the domain of untrained teenagers fixated on sonic effects, such as wah-wah and fuzz tone, and relied heavily on riffs. The music later blurred into psychedelia. American garage bands retained the rawness and energy of garage rock, while incorporating its use of heavy distortion, feedback, and layered sonic effects into their versions of psychedelic music, which spawned early examples of "acid rock". Bisport and Puterbaugh, who defined acid rock as an intense or raw form of psychedelia, include "garagey" psychedelia under the label of "acid rock" due in part to its "energy and intimation of psychic overload". Exemplary garage-psych acts include Blues Magoos, the Electric Prunes, and the Music Machine.

Count Five – "Psychotic Reaction" (1966)
Count Five's "Psychotic Reaction", among the first successful acid (or psychedelic) rock songs, contained the characteristics that would come to define acid rock: the use of feedback and distortion replacing early rock music's more melodic electric guitars.

The earliest known use of the terms "garage punk" or "garage rock" appeared in Lenny Kaye's track-by-track liner notes for the 1972 anthology compilation Nuggets: Original Artyfacts from the First Psychedelic Era, 1965-1968, to describe a song by the Shadows of Knight, as "classic garage punk". At the time, the term "punk rock" referred to the garage rock of the 1960s, with the compilation's liner notes containing one of the earliest known uses of the term. Musicologist Simon Frith cites Nuggets, as a showcase for the garage psychedelia of the 1960s, with the compilation epitomizing an overlap between 1960s garage rock and early psychedelia. In 1984, English music journalist Phil Smee coined the term "freakbeat" when compiling reissues of obscure mid-1960s records for the Rubble series, which featured heavily distorted mod music derived from British beat that used psychedelic studio experimentation. Freakbeat bands such as the Count Five, with their 1966 single "Psychotic Reaction", contained some of the earliest characteristics that would later come to define acid rock, such as the emphasizing of guitar feedback and distortion over traditional rock production.

Another group included on the Nuggets album, the 13th Floor Elevators from Austin, Texas, began as a straight garage rock band before becoming one of the original early acid rock bands and pioneers of psychedelic rock in general, with a sound consisting of guitar effects, screeching vocals, and "occasionally demented" lyrics. Their debut album, The Psychedelic Sounds of the 13th Floor Elevators, featuring the garage rock hit "You're Gonna Miss Me", was among the earliest psychedelic rock albums. At around the same time, New York City's the Blues Magoos were referring to their wailing garage and blues rock as "psychedelic music", which would also be increasingly labeled "acid rock".

Music critic Lester Bangs writing in 1981 in his essay "Protopunk: The Garage Bands" noted that during the mid-1960s, American garage rock bands such as the Count Five, the Seeds, the Standells, the Music Machine and the Electric Prunes began to draw influences from the early psychedelic music scene: "The next phase of protopunk coincided with the rise of psychedelia and the fall of folk rock in 1966. Now the garage bands entered their golden age, as new technical developments like fuzztone and the electric 12-string guitar put truly awesome sonic possibilities within the reach of the most limited musicians. What’s more, just about the time they were also discovering acid, all these guys found out about instant ragas: to approximate the sounds of the mystic East, all they had to do was play scales up and down their fretboards".

=== Distinctions from other psychedelic rock ===
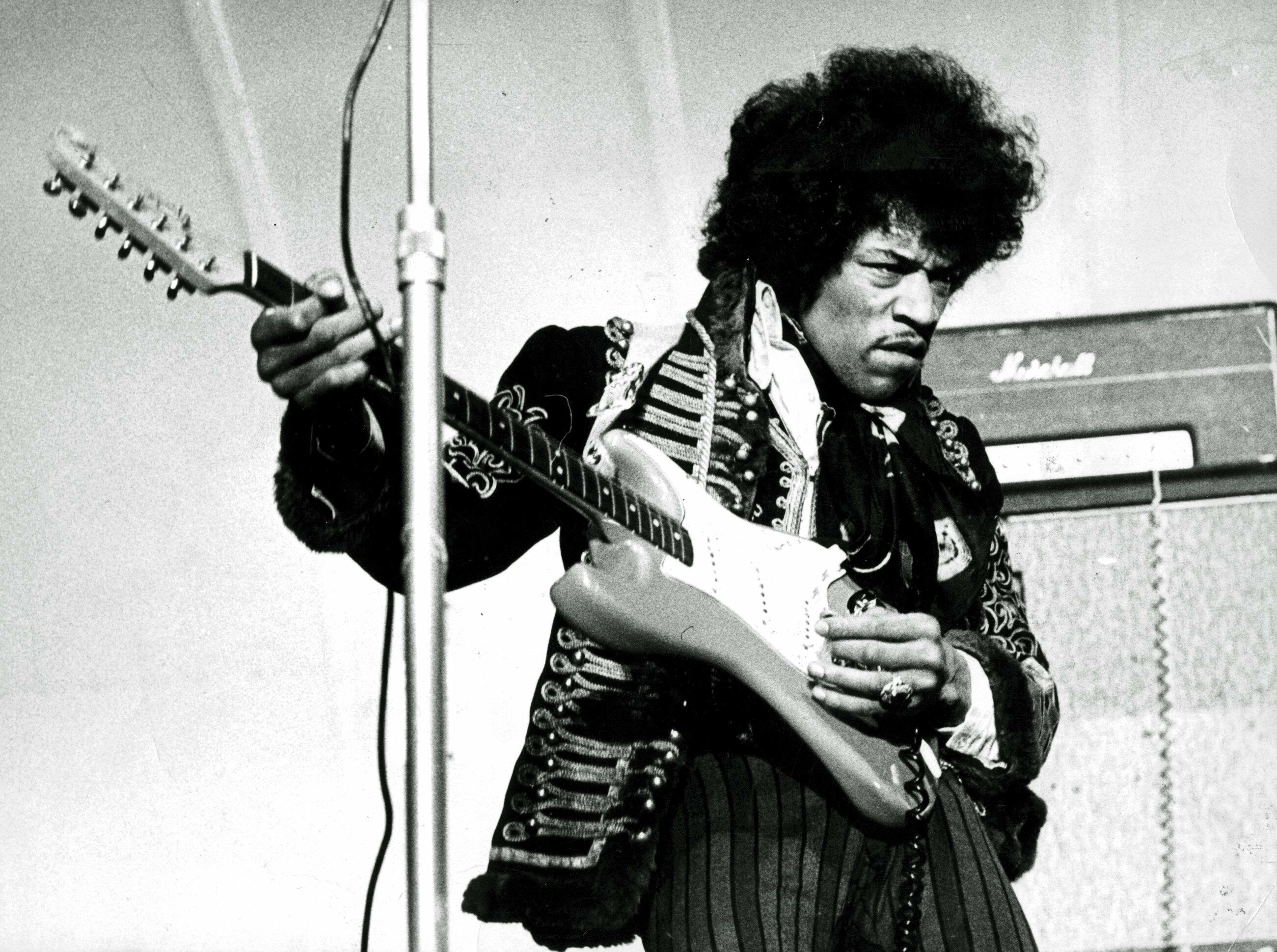
Jimi Hendrix performing in 1967

Acid rock often encompasses the more extreme side of the psychedelic rock genre, frequently containing a loud, improvised, and guitar-centered sound. Alan Bisbort and Parke Puterbaugh write that acid rock "can best be described as psychedelia at its rawest and most intense ... Bad trips as well as good, riots as well as peace, pain as well as pleasure - the whole spectrum of reality, not just the idyllic bits, were captured by acid rock." "Acid rock" has also been described as more heavily electric and containing more distortion ("fuzz") than typical psychedelic rock. By the late 1960s, in addition to the deliberate use of distortion and feedback, acid rock was further characterized by long guitar solos and the frequent use of electronic organs. Lyric references to drug use were also common, as exemplified in Jefferson Airplane's 1967 song "White Rabbit" and Jimi Hendrix Experience's 1967 song "Purple Haze". Lyrical references to drugs such as LSD were often cryptic.

The Animals – "Sky Pilot" (1968)
Crossover in the two major psychedelic rock variants (acid rock and British-influenced psychedelic rock) did occur; the Animals' song "Sky Pilot" was among the few songs of the era to juxtapose the elaborate orchestration of Sgt. Pepper-influenced, British-style psychedelic rock with the more Hendrix-influenced, electric guitar-centered American acid rock style.

At a time when many British psychedelic bands played whimsical or surrealistic psychedelic rock, many 1960s American rock bands, especially those from the West Coast, developed a rawer or harder version of psychedelic rock containing garage rock energy. When contrasted with whimsical British psychedelia, this harder American West Coast variant of psychedelic rock has been referred to as acid rock. (Note: British psychedelia was often more arty in its experimentation, and it tended to stick within pop song structures. Along with its whimsical and surrealist tendencies, British psychedelic rock was generally not as minimalist and not as aggressive as its American counterpart, often featuring longer song arrangements and incorporating Eastern instruments such as sitars.) American psychedelic rock and garage bands such as the 13th Floor Elevators epitomized the frenetic, darker and more psychotic sound of American acid rock, a sound characterized by droning guitar riffs, amplified feedback, and guitar distortion. Hoffman writes that acid rock lacked the recording studio "gimmickry" that typified the more Beatles-influenced strain of psychedelic rock, though acid rock experimented in other ways with electrified guitar effects.

Tonal distortion was also one of the defining characteristics of the San Francisco Sound. The acid rock of the San Francisco Sound heavily incorporated musical improvisation, jamming, repetitive drum beats, experimental sound and tape effects, and intentional feedback. San Francisco acid rock generally took a non-commercial approach to song-writing: it often involved almost free jazz-like, free-form hard rock improvisations alongside distorted guitars, and lyrics often were socially conscious, trippy, or anti-establishment. Many of the musicians in the scene, including bands such as the Charlatans and the Quicksilver Messenger Service, became involved in Ken Kesey's LSD-driven psychedelic scene, known as the Merry Pranksters.

=== Transition to hard rock and heavy metal ===
Heavy metal evolved from psychedelic music and acid rock and added psychedelic/acid rock to the basic structure of blues rock. In the 1960s, the heavy, blues-influenced, psychedelic hard rock sound of bands such as the Jimi Hendrix Experience, Deep Purple, and Cream was classified as acid rock. Other acid rock groups such as Blue Cheer, Iron Butterfly, and Vanilla Fudge are examples of early heavy metal, or proto-metal, creating stripped-downed, loud, intense, and "fuzzy" acid rock or hard rock. Bands such as Blue Cheer, Cream, and the hard rock group The Amboy Dukes have all been described as "leading practitioners" of the harder variant of psychedelic rock known as "acid rock". Many acid rock bands subsequently became heavy metal bands.

Iron Butterfly – "In-A-Gadda-Da-Vida" (1968)
Iron Butterfly's "In-A-Gadda-Da-Vida" is sometimes described as an example of the transition from acid rock into heavy metal, a movement that proved to be massively influenced by their album of the same name.

The influence of acid rock was evident in the sound of heavy metal in the 1970s. Iron Butterfly's "In-A-Gadda-Da-Vida" is sometimes described as an example of the transition between acid rock and heavy metal or the turning point in which acid rock became "heavy metal". "In-A-Gadda-Da-Vida" is a notable example of 1960s and early 1970s acid rock or heavy psychedelia, and the band continued to experiment with distorted, "fuzzy", heavy psychedelia into the 1970s. Both Iron Butterfly's 1968 album In-A-Gadda-Da-Vida and Blue Cheer's 1968 album Vincebus Eruptum have been described as influential in the transition of acid rock into heavy metal. Heavy metal's acid rock origins can further be seen in the loud acid rock of groups such as Steppenwolf, who contributed their song "Born to Be Wild" to the soundtrack of the 1969 film Easy Rider, which itself glamorized the genre. Ultimately, Steppenwolf and other acid rock groups such as Cream, the Jimi Hendrix Experience, and Led Zeppelin paved the way for the electrified, bluesy sound of early heavy metal.

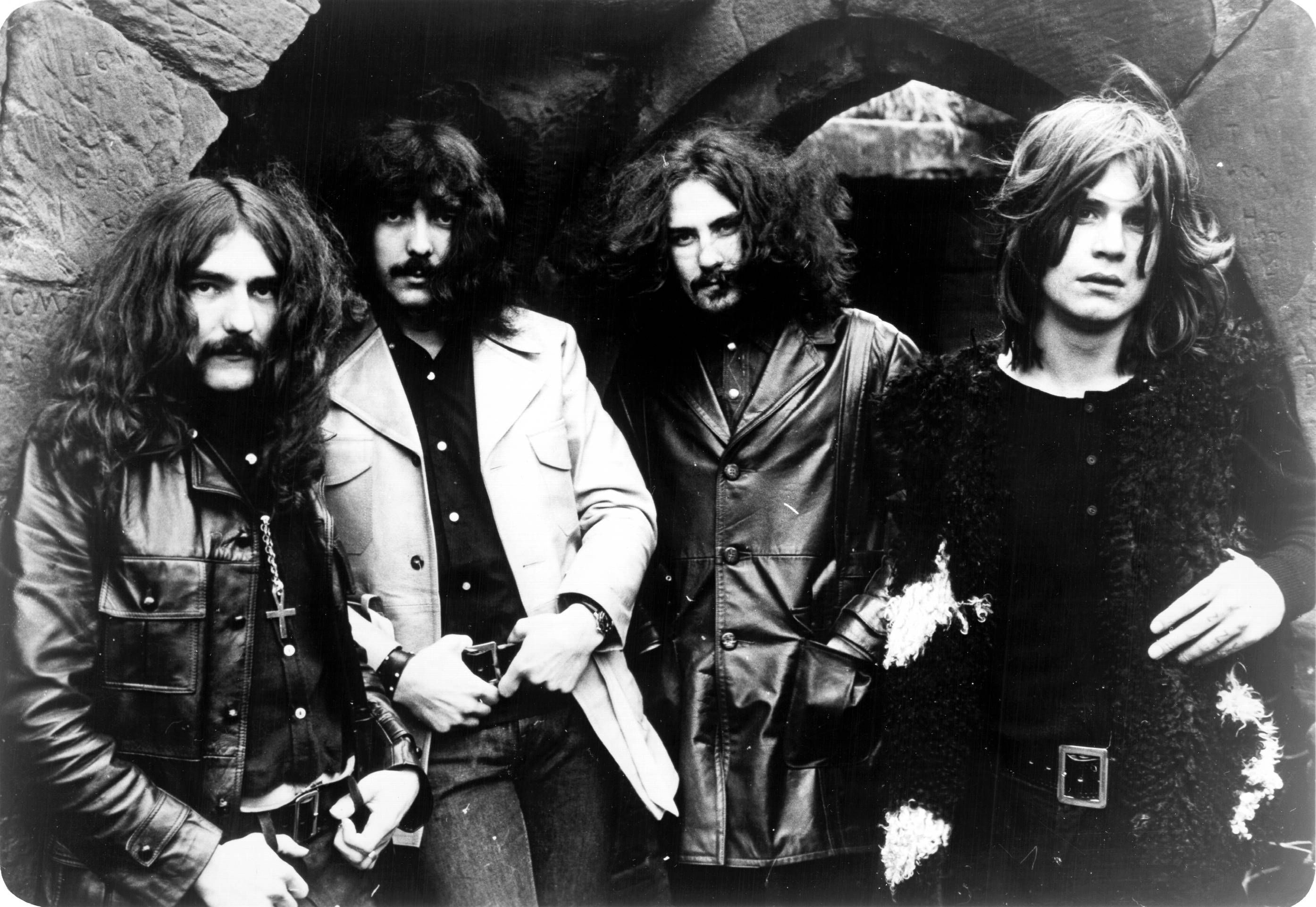
Black Sabbath, 1970

Coven is an American rock band formed in Chicago in the late 1960s. They had a top 40 hit in 1971 with the song "One Tin Soldier", the theme song of the movie Billy Jack. In addition to pioneering occult rock with lyrics and aesthetics that explicitly dealt in themes of Satanism and witchcraft, they are recognized by metal fans and metal historians as being the band that introduced the "Sign of the horns" to rock, metal and pop culture, as seen on their 1969 debut album release Witchcraft Destroys Minds & Reaps Souls. By the early 1970s, bands such as Deep Purple, Led Zeppelin and Black Sabbath combined the loud, raw distortion of acid rock with occult lyrics, further forming a basis for the genre now known as "heavy metal". At a time when rock music began to turn back to roots-oriented soft rock, many acid rock groups instead evolved into heavy metal bands. As its own movement, heavy metal music continued to perpetuate characteristics of acid rock bands into at least the 1980s, and traces of psychedelic rock can be seen in the musical excesses of later metal bands. In the 1990s, the stoner metal genre combined acid rock with other hard rock genres such as grunge, updating the heavy riffs and long jams found in the acid rock and psychedelic-influenced metal of bands such as Black Sabbath, Blue Cheer, Hawkwind, and Blue Öyster Cult.

In addition to hard rock and heavy metal, acid rock also gave rise to the progressive rock movement. In the 1970s, elements of psychedelic music split into two notable directions, evolving into the hard rock and heavy metal of Black Sabbath, Deep Purple, and Led Zeppelin on one side and into the progressive rock of bands such Pink Floyd and Yes on the other. Bands such as Yes, Pink Floyd, King Crimson, and Emerson, Lake, and Palmer kept the psychedelic musical movement alive for some time, but eventually moved away from drug-themed music towards experiments in electronic music and the addition of classical music themes into rock music.

== Bibliography ==
- Beck, John H. (2013). Encyclopedia of Percussion. Routledge. ISBN 978-1-317-74768-0.
- Bill, J. Brent (1984). Rock and Roll. F.H. Revell Co. ISBN 978-0-8007-5156-2.
- Bisbort, Alan; Puterbaugh, Parke (2000). Rhino's Psychedelic Trip. Hal Leonard Corporation. ISBN 9780879306267.
- Brend, Mark (2005). Strange Sounds: Offbeat Instruments and Sonic Experiments in Pop. Hal Leonard Corporation. ISBN 9780879308551.
- Brown, Charles T. (1986). Music U.S.A.: America's country & western tradition. Prentice-Hall. "san francisco sound heavy metal."
- Browne, Ray Broadus; Browne, Pat (2001). The Guide to United States Popular Culture. Popular Press. ISBN 9780879728212.
- Bukszpan, Daniel; Dio, Ronnie James (2003). The Encyclopedia of Heavy Metal. Barnes & Noble Publishing. ISBN 9780760742181.
- Case, George (2010). Out of Our Heads: Rock 'n' Roll Before the Drugs Wore Off. Hal Leonard Corporation. ISBN 9780879309671.
- Dasher, Richard T. (1985). History of Rock Music. J. Weston Walch.
- DeRogatis, Jim (2003). Turn on Your Mind: Four Decades of Great Psychedelic Rock. Hal Leonard Corporation. ISBN 978-0-634-05548-5.
- Drabløs, Per Elias (2016). The Quest for the Melodic Electric Bass: From Jamerson to Spenner. Routledge. ISBN 978-1-317-01837-7.
- Eder, Bruce (2001). All Music Guide: The Definitive Guide to Popular Music. Hal Leonard Corporation. ISBN 978-0-87930-627-4.
- Freeman, Alan; Freeman, Steve (1996). The Crack in the Cosmic Egg: Encyclopedia of Krautrock, Kosmische Musik & Other Progressive, Experimental & Electronic Musics from Germany. Audion. ISBN 9780952950608.
- Frith, Simon (2004). Popular Music: Music and identity, Volume 4. Psychology Press. ISBN 978-0-415-33270-5.
- Gammond, Peter (1991). The Oxford Companion to Popular Music. Oxford University Press. ISBN 978-0-19-311323-7.
- Godfrey, Donald. A; Leigh, Frederic A. (1998). Historical Dictionary of American Radio. Greenwood Publishing Group. ISBN 978-0-313-29636-9.
- Henderson, Lol; Stacey, Lee (2014). Encyclopedia of Music in the 20th Century. Routledge. ISBN 978-1-135-92946-6.
- Hoffmann, Frank (2004). Encyclopedia of Recorded Sound. Routledge. ISBN 978-1-135-94950-1.
- Holm-Hudson, Kevin, ed. (2013). Progressive Rock Reconsidered. Routledge. ISBN 978-1-135-71022-4.
- Hull, Robot A. (2003) [1981]. "Sound and Visions: Psychedelia". In Hoskyns, Barney (ed.). The Sound and the Fury: 40 Years of Classic Rock Journalism: A Rock's Backpages Reader. Bloomsbury USA. ISBN 978-1-58234-282-5.
- Jasinski, Laurie E. (2012). Handbook of Texas Music. Texas A&M University Press. ISBN 978-0-87611-297-7.
- Joyson, Vernon (1984). The Acid Trip: A Complete Guide to Psychedelic Music. Todmorden, England: Babylon Books. ISBN 978-0-907188-24-7.
- Kirkpatrick, Rob (2011). 1969: The Year Everything Changed. Skyhorse Publishing. ISBN 9781616080556.
- Knowles, Christopher (2010). The Secret History of Rock 'n' Roll. Cleis Press. ISBN 9781573444057.
- Kuhn, Laura Diane (1999). Baker's Student Encyclopedia of Music: A-G. Schirmer Books. ISBN 978-0-02-865415-7. "acid rock baker's."
- Larson, Tom (2004). History of Rock and Roll. Kendall Hunt. ISBN 9780787299699.
- Lucky, Jerry (2003). The Psychedelic Rock Files. Collector's Guide Publishing Inc. ISBN 1-896522-97-1.
- Luft, Eric v.d. (2009). Die at the Right Time!: A Subjective Cultural History of the American Sixties. Gegensatz Press. ISBN 9781933237398.
- McEneaney, Kevin T. (2009). Tom Wolfe's America: Heroes, Pranksters, and Fools. ABC-CLIO. ISBN 978-0-313-36545-4.
- McLauchlin, Luke (2015). Acid Rock: LSD, Psychedelc Rock, and the San Francisco Sound. Ipicturebooks. ISBN 978-1-329-25654-5.
- Misiroglu, Gina (2015). American Countercultures: An Encyclopedia of Nonconformists, Alternative Lifestyles, and Radical Ideas in U.S. History. Routledge. ISBN 9781317477297.
- Moore, Hank (2015). Houston Legends: History and Heritage of Dynamic Global Capitol. Morgan James Publishing. ISBN 9781630474690.
- Nobles, Mark A. (2012). Fort Worth's Rock and Roll Roots. Arcadia Publishing. ISBN 978-0-7385-8499-7.
- Perone, James E. (2001). Songs of the Vietnam Conflict. Greenwood Publishing Group. ISBN 9780313315282.
- Reynolds, Simon (2012). Energy Flash: A Journey Through Rave Music and Dance Culture. Counterpoint LLC. ISBN 978-1-59376-477-7.
- Rolling Stone Magazine Staff (15 September 1989). "Talking with the Legend of Rock and Roll (Jerry Garcia)". The Rolling Stone Interviews: 1967–1980. Macmillan. ISBN 0-312-03486-5.
- Romano, Will (2010). Mountains Come Out of the Sky: The Illustrated History of Prog Rock. Milwaukee, WI: Backbeat Books. p. 17. ISBN 978-0-87930-991-6.
- Rood, Karen Lane (1994). American culture after World War II. Gale Research. ISBN 9780810384811. "but its influence is apparent in the heavy-metal sound."
- Unterberger, Richie (2002). All Music Guide to Rock: The Definitive Guide to Rock, Pop, and Soul. Hal Leonard Corporation. ISBN 9780879306533.
- Weinstein, Deena (2009). Heavy Metal: The Music and Its Culture. Da Capo Press. ISBN 9780786751037.
- Waksman, Steve (2001). Instruments of Desire: The Electric Guitar and the Shaping of Musical Experience. Harvard University Press. ISBN 9780674005471.
- Wolfe, Tom (1968). The Electric Kool-Aid Acid Test. Black Swan. ISBN 0-552-99366-2.
- Szatmary, David P. (2014). Rockin' in time: a social history of rock-and-roll. Pearson.
- Academic American Encyclopedia (Vol 16 ed.). Grolier. 1985.
- Fuzz, Acid and Flowers: A Comprehensive Guide to American Garage, Psychedelic and Hippie Rock (1964–1975). Borderline. 1997.
