= The Nova Local =

- Origin: Chapel Hill, North Carolina, United States
- Genres: Psychedelic pop
- Years active: 1964–unknown
- Past members: Randy Winburn; Joe Mendyk; Phil Lambeth; Jim Opton; Cam Schinhan; Bill Levasseur

The Nova Local was a psychedelic pop band formed in Chapel Hill, North Carolina, in 1964, initially under the name The Shadows. It was composed of singer Randy Winburn, guitarists Joe Mendyk and Phil Lambeth, bassist Jim Opton, keyboardist Cam Schinhan and drummer Bill Levasseur. Their single "If You Only Had the Time", released in 1967, was a minor hit in North Carolina. They recorded one album, Nova 1 (released on Decca Records in 1968 in the United States), shortly before disbanding. The album was also released in Canada and in the United Kingdom. According to Opton, the album was the first ever recorded using the Dolby NR system.

The lines "Is it much too much to ask / Not to hide behind the mask?" from "If You Only Had the Time" are sampled on MF Doom's 2005 song "The Mask".

== Nova 1 Track listing ==
1. "$5 A Ticket"
2. "If You Only Had The Time"
3. "Yascha Knew Deli Intimately"
4. "A Visit From It, The King"
5. "Tobacco Road"
6. "Hitch Hike"
7. "Morning Dew"
8. "Forgotten Man"
9. "Dear Jimi"
10. "And I Remember"
11. "John Knight's Body"
