= Ancient River =

US musical group

- Origin: Gainesville, Florida, United States
- Genres: Psychedelic rock
- Years active: 2008-present
- Labels: Summer Moon; Music Excavation
- Members: James Barreto; Alexis Cordova Jnr
- Past members: Zachary Veltheim; Chad Voight
- Website: www.ancientrivertheband.com

Ancient River is a psychedelic rock band formed in 2008. The band was created by singer/songwriter James Barreto, and features Barreto (vocals/guitar/songwriter) and Alexis Cordova Jr. (drums/vocals).

Formed in 2008, with friends and now past members Zachary Veltheim on bass (from Barreto's previous band The Ohm) and Chad Voight on drums.

The band name was taken from the Neil Young song "Thrasher": “Where the eagle glides ascending/There’s an ancient river bending/Down the timeless gorge of changes/Where sleeplessness awaits.”

In reviewing 2011's Songs from North America, the Knoxville Mercury described Ancient River's music as reminiscent of "the sun-baked desert twang of the Meat Puppets and Crazy Horse."

Cordova and Barreto met when Cordova moved to Gainesville to join another band. In the Mercury interview, Cordova is quoted as saying, "when I found out about [Ancient River], if I hadn’t joined, they probably would have been my favorite band in Gainesville. I kind of feel like it was the right time, right place." Cordova now plays drums in the band, which was his first instrument growing up.

The band's origins can be traced back the music scene in Gainesville, Florida and its thriving home grown DIY scene. Barreto, who had trained as an audio engineer, had a home studio and was busy recording local musicians.

Ancient River made their debut at Austin Psych Festival on April 24, 2010. Cordova joined the line up in 2011 and the band began regularly playing the live circuit, playing Liverpool International Festival of Psychedelia and Austin Psych Festival for a second time in 2012. Appearances at Los Angeles’ Psycho De Mayo and Desert Stars Festival Pre-Party followed in 2014 along with Milwaukee Psych Fest in 2015.

In 2013 their track 'Waiting For The Light' was featured on British television series Hollyoaks Later in the United Kingdom

Currently Barreto is living in Los Angeles and Cordova is based in Detroit but this distance hasn't impacted their productivity. Ancient River has eight releases. Keeper of the Dawn released on April 14, 2015 was inspired by the Italian horror films of writer/director Dario Argento together with one of the duo's favourite musicians, David Axelrod. Following its release, the band toured North America for 51 shows.

In June 2015, Ancient River joined forces with London director, writer and actor Xevi Soler to produce a music video for their track Stay With Me. This was the soundtrack to Soler's short film Golem.

NME featured Ancient River in their "Under the Radar" section on July 18, 2015.

== Albums/EPs ==
- 2020 The House Of Stone (LP)
- 2019 After the Dawn (LP)
- 2017 O.D.D.S 2 (LP)
- 2017 The Keeper Never Sleeps (EP)
- 2015 Keeper Of The Dawn (LP)
- 2014 Before Dawn (LP) Recorded in 2007
- 2012 On The Other Side (LP)
- 2012 Let It Live (LP)
- 2011 Polaroid (EP)
- 2011 Songs from North America (LP)
- 2010 O.D.D.S. (LP)
- 2010 Under the Sun (EP)
