= Snowdome (disambiguation) =

Snowdome is an indoor ski slope in Tamworth, Staffordshire, England.

Snowdome may also refer to:

- Snowdome Adelaide, a former indoor ski slope in Adelaide, Australia
- Dubai Snowdome, an indoor ski slope in Dubailand, Dubai
- "Snowdome" (song), a song by Kaela Kimura

== See also ==
- Snow globe, a transparent sphere enclosing a miniaturized scene
- Snow Dome (disambiguation)
