= Snow Dome =

Snow Dome may refer to:

== Places ==
- Snow Dome (Canada), a mountain in Alberta and British Columbia, Canada
- Snow Dome, Concordia, a mountain in Concordia in Gilgit–Baltistan, Pakistan
- Snow Dome, Chaprot, a mountain in Chaprot Pass in Gilgit–Baltistan, Pakistan
- Snow Dome, Bispingen, an indoor ski slope in Bispingen, Germany

== See also ==
- Snow globe, a transparent sphere enclosing a miniaturized scene
- Snowdome (disambiguation)
