= Donald Clarke (writer) =

American writer (born 1940)

Donald Milton Clarke
- Born: 1940 (age 85–86); Kenosha, Wisconsin, U.S.
- Education: University of Wisconsin–Madison
- Occupation: Writer
- Writing career
- Notable works: The Rise and Fall of Popular Music (1995)
- Website: donaldclarkemusicbox.com

Donald Milton Clarke (born 1940) is an American writer on music.

== Career ==
Clarke was born in 1940 and raised in Kenosha, Wisconsin. From 1959 through 1969, he worked at a car factory in Kenosha, American Motors Corporation. In 1973, he graduated from the University of Wisconsin–Madison with a Bachelor of Science in education with honors. He lived in England from 1973 to 1998, during which time, from 1974 to 1979, he worked for Marshall Cavendish Publications.

From 1998, Clarke lived in Austin, Texas, moving in 2003 to West Des Moines, Iowa, where he worked for a time on the music e-zines BluesWax and FolkWax. He then moved to Allentown, Pennsylvania in 2009 and to Colorado Springs in 2014.

Clarke was the author/editor of the Penguin Encyclopedia of Popular Music (1989, 1998), which is now available free on his website. His other books include Wishing on the Moon: The Life and Times of Billie Holiday (1994), The Rise and Fall of Popular Music (1995), and All or Nothing at All: A Life of Frank Sinatra (1997). The Billie Holiday biography was reprinted by Da Capo Press in 2000 under the title Billie Holiday: Wishing on the Moon.

== Selected work ==
Books

- The Penguin Encyclopedia of Popular Music (1st ed., 1989, published by Penguin Books). Viking Press. 1990 [1989] – via Internet Archive (Duke University Libraries). LCCN 88-40587; ISBN 0-6708-0349-9 (hardback), ISBN 0-1405-1147-4 (paperback).
- The Rise and Fall of Popular Music (1st ed.). New York: St. Martin's Press. 1995. ISBN 9780312142001 – via Internet Archive (Kahle/Austin Foundation). LCCN 94-36824; ISBN 0-3121-1573-3
- All or Nothing at All – A Life of Frank Sinatra. Thorndike, Maine: Thorndike Press. Bath, England: Chivers Press. 1998 – via Internet Archive (Arcadia Fund). LCCN 97-51266.
- Clarke, Donald (2002) [2009, 2000, 1998, 1995, 1994]. Billie Holiday: Wishing on the Moon (First Da Capo Press ed.). Cambridge, Massachusetts. ISBN 9780306811364 – via Internet Archive (Arcadia Fund). LCCN 94-8881; ISBN 0-6708-3771-7; ISBN 0-3068-1136-7, 978-0-3068-1136-4; OCLC 30036926 (all editions).

Articles

- Clarke, Donald (2012). "Holiday, Billie [Harris, Elinore; Fagan, Eleanora; Lady Day]". Grove Music Online – "The World's Premier Authority on all Aspects of Music" (published in print: November 26, 2013. Published online October 4, 2012). Oxford Music Online. doi:10.1093/gmo/9781561592630.article.A2228483. ISBN 978-1-56159-263-0. LCCN 2002-604974 (2nd ed; 2002); OCLC 70513996 (all editions); doi:10.1093/gmo/9781561592630.article.A2228483.
