= List of neo-psychedelia artists =

This is a list of neo-psychedelia artists. Individuals are alphabetized by surname.

== A–M ==
- Animal Collective
- Apollo Sunshine
- The Apples in Stereo
- Arctic Monkeys
- Beck
- The Bevis Frond
- The Black Angels
- Blind Melon
- The Brian Jonestown Massacre
- Burner Herzog
- The Church
- Crumb
- Dead Meadow
- Djo
- Dr. Dog
- The Dream Syndicate
- Empire of the Sun
- Fishmans
- The Flaming Lips
- Forest for the Trees
- Foster the People
- Gorky's Zygotic Mynci
- Grizzly Bear
- Guardian Alien
- Robyn Hitchcock
- Jane's Addiction
- Jellyfish
- Kasabian
- Keane
- Khruangbin
- Kid Cudi
- King Gizzard & the Lizard Wizard
- Lenny Kravitz
- Kula Shaker
- Lava La Rue
- Jasper Leach
- Lil Yachty
- Magdalena Bay
- Mazzy Star
- Melody's Echo Chamber
- Mercury Rev
- MGMT
- Moon Duo
- My Morning Jacket

== N–Z ==
- Oasis
- Oh Sees
- The Olivia Tremor Control
- OOIOO
- Phish
- Plasticland
- Pond
- Portugal. The Man
- Primal Scream
- Prince
- Psychedelic Porn Crumpets
- Quest for Fire
- Raccoo-oo-oon
- Radio Moscow
- Screaming Trees
- The Soft Boys
- The Soundtrack of Our Lives
- Spacemen 3
- Sparklehorse
- Spindrift
- Stardeath and White Dwarfs
- Still Corners
- Still Woozy
- The Stone Roses
- Stone Temple Pilots
- SubArachnoid Space
- Super Furry Animals
- Suuns
- Tame Impala
- Teardrop Explodes
- Temples
- Tripping Daisy
- Unknown Mortal Orchestra
- Vibravoid
- The Verve
- Vinyl Williams
- The War On Drugs
- Warpaint
- White Hills (band)
- Ween
- Will Z.
- Wooden Shjips
- Woods
- Yves Tumor

== See also ==
- List of dream pop artists
- List of shoegaze bands
