= Snowglobe (band) =

American musical group

- Snowglobe (Memphis, Tennessee)

Background information
- Origin: Athens, Georgia; Memphis, Tennessee
- Genres: Indie rock Psychedelic rock
- Years active: 1999—present
- Labels: Makeshift Music, Bardot Records
- Members: Jeff Hulett- drums Brandon Robertson- bass Brad Postlethwaite- vocals, piano, guitar Tim Regan- vocals, piano, guitar Nahshon Benford- trumpet, flute Luke White- vocals, guitar
- Past members: Brian Winterrowd
- Website: www.makeshiftmusic.com

Snowglobe is an American musical group based in the southern United States. While their music covers a range of styles and genres, they are generally referred to as an indie rock group. The band has had a rotating cast over the years, but the primary members are currently Brad Postlethwaite (vocals, guitar/piano), Nahshon Benford (horns, flute), Jeff Hulett (drums), Tim Regan (vocals, guitar/piano), Brandon Robertson (bass), and Luke White (vocals, guitar).

== Biography ==
Snowglobe was formed in Athens, GA in 1999 and was heavily influenced at that time by their interactions with the Elephant 6 collective. Brandon Robertson and Jeremy Freeze (the original guitarist) remained in Athens for several years, living with members of the Olivia Tremor Control and Elf Power. The rest of the band, however, migrated shortly back to their hometown of Memphis TN. Upon arriving in Memphis, Brad Postlethwaite moved in with Jeff Hulett and Jay Reatard. Hulett played drums for a local band called Palindrome. Reatard was working with Alicja Trout in the "Lost Sounds" at that time. Though they never played with Snowglobe, Reatard and Trout influenced some elements of the band's sound and production as Snowglobe began integrating synth and keyboards into their music.

Sometime around the end of 2000 and beginning of 2001, Snowglobe's line up changed. Jeff Hulett replaced Brian Winterrowd on drums, and Tim Regan (in Liftoff at the time) joined as a co-songwriter. In addition, the original bassist (Brandon Robertson) moved back to Memphis and Nahshon Benford started playing horns for the band. With this lineup they wrote some new material, reworked old Snowglobe and Liftoff songs, and compiled a list of 25-30 songs to record. Through process of elimination, the list got trimmed down to a 16 track long album, which became the band's first official release on Bardot records in 2002. The album, titled "Our Land Brains", was critically acclaimed in the indie press, and charted in the CMJ top 40. Over the next few years, Snowglobe continued to tour the United States. Initially, their touring lineup was somewhat stripped down, described in 2002 by the Washington Post as "standard pop-rock issue--4 guys with guitars and drums...(and) lovely harmonies throughout." Over the years, Snowglobe's live show began incorporating horns, samples, and many of the other nuances present on their recordings.

Snowglobe wrote and recorded their second record Doing the Distance which came out in 2004. In late 2006 and early 2007, Brad Postlethwaite started Medical School and Tim Regan moved to Austin, TX and began touring with Oh No Oh My. Luke White, of "the Coach and Four" and "Colour Revolt", also joined the band at this time. Snowglobe's next record, Oxytocin, did not feature any of Regan's songs. He soon returned to Memphis, however, to begin work on the band's new EP and full length before returning to Austin TX.

2009 was a busy year for Snowglobe. They were featured in MTV's $5 Cover Memphis series, directed by Craig Brewer (Hustle and Flow), and they released an EP titled "No Need to Light a Night Light on a Night Like Tonight."

In May 2010 Snowglobe released their latest full length "Little More Lived In". In a review of this latest album Pitchfork exclaimed Snowglobe's style of emotionally straightforward, heavily arranged music has become one of the defining sounds of indie rock.

== Band members ==
- Brad Postlethwaite
- Tim Regan
- Brandon Robertson
- Nahshon Benford
- Jeff Hulett
- Luke White

== Discography ==
In the 20+ years that they have been together, Snowglobe has completed 6 full-length albums and 1 EP:

- Our Land Brains (2002)
- Doing the Distance (2004)
- Oxytocin (2006)
- Me and You (2008)
- No Need to Light a Night Light on a Night Like Tonight EP (2009)
- Little More Lived In (2010)
- Snowglobe (2016)
