= Baby Guru =

- Origin: Marousi, Athens, Greece,
- Genres: Krautrock, Psychedelic rock
- Years active: 2009–present
- Label: Inner Ear records,
- Members: King Elephant; Prins Obi; Sir Kosmiche
- Website: babyguruband.com

Baby Guru is a Greek band based in Athens. Their music traverses the wider spectre of rock, with heavy influences from genres such as krautrock and psychedelic rock, while the lyrics of their songs are almost exclusively written in English. They have released three albums, two of which had an international distribution.

== Biography ==
=== The first steps ===
The members of the band are King Elephant (Yannis Karras), Prins Obi (Yorgos Dimakis, initially under the name Obi Serotone), who is the singer and main lyricist of the band and Sir Kosmiche (Axios Zafirakos). The three childhood friends started playing music together during the last years of highschool under the name Art. Later Karras and Zafirakos were members of the band Duke Abduction for a short period. The three of them met again in 2009 and begun jamming in their own studio and creating musical tracks by sampling and editing the recordings of their jam sessions. The name of the band was inspired by the krautrock band Guru Guru and Captain Beefheart’s song “Ella Guru” In 2010 they gave a series of live performances in Athens, while they distributed electronically their first EP, Yogi Sister vol. I & vol. ΙΙ, a collection of their early recordings.

=== First releases ===
Their first self-titled work, Baby Guru, was released in September 2011 by the indie label Inner Ear records. An early limited edition print of Baby Guru in vinyl quickly sold out, a sign of the interest that the band had raised. The album's music style bared heavy krautrock influences by bands such as Can and Neu!, with the short length of the tracks however giving them a more pop feel in comparison to the music of the aforementioned bands. Critical reception was relatively positive, highlighting the band's distinct sound in comparison to other contemporary Greek indie groups, however some critics were dismissive of what they considered a stale attachment to the past, while some of the compositions were judged as abstract stylistic exercises.

Baby Guru's first work in 2012 was the music for the theater show Why I killed my best friend, an adaptation of a novel with the same title by Amanda Michalopoulou. In June of that year King Elephant released his first solo work titled Under the bed while August saw the free digital release of the EP Covers that contained an intro and three cover songs.

Baby Guru's sophomore album, Pieces, was released in October 2012 and it was widely accepted as a significant step forward compared to ‘’Baby Guru’’. The krautrock influences were still there but this time there were further explorations of the psychedelic rock of the ‘60s and ‘70s, while guitars became a more prominent part of their sound. The album was released in several European countries under distribution by Rough Trade and V2 records, gathering favorable reviews. In the beginning of 2013 the band embarked on a mini tour in the Netherlands to support the local release of Pieces. Towards the end of 2013 Prins Obi released digitally gratis his first solo EP, Love Songs for Instant Success.

=== Release of ‘’Marginalia’’ ===
Their third album, titled Marginalia was released in March 2014. The references to krautrock and psychedelia remained, while the band expanded further its music by turning towards new wave and synthpop of the ‘80s. The opening track and first single, "Especially when", was built around guitar riffs, an unusual choice for the band. Also, for the first time they included a song with Greek lyrics, “Exegersis”. Once again critical acceptance was very positive with many considering it as Baby Guru's best release. The band did extensive touring to support the release of the album. In October 2014 they appeared in the CMJ Music Marathon in New York, where they were hailed as one of the 5 top discoveries of the festival.

=== Release of ‘’Sunshine Special’’ ===
Following their growing fame and fanbase Sunshine Special was released in Autumn 2015. It features songs in Greek and English and generally received good critics.

== Discography ==
=== LPs ===
- Baby Guru (2011)
- Pieces (2012)
- Marginalia (2014)
- Sunshine Special (2015)

=== Singles & EPs ===
- Yogi Sister, Vol. I & Vol. II (2010)
- Covers (2012)
- Yogi Sister III (2013)
