= The Holydrug Couple =

Chilean psychedelic rock duo

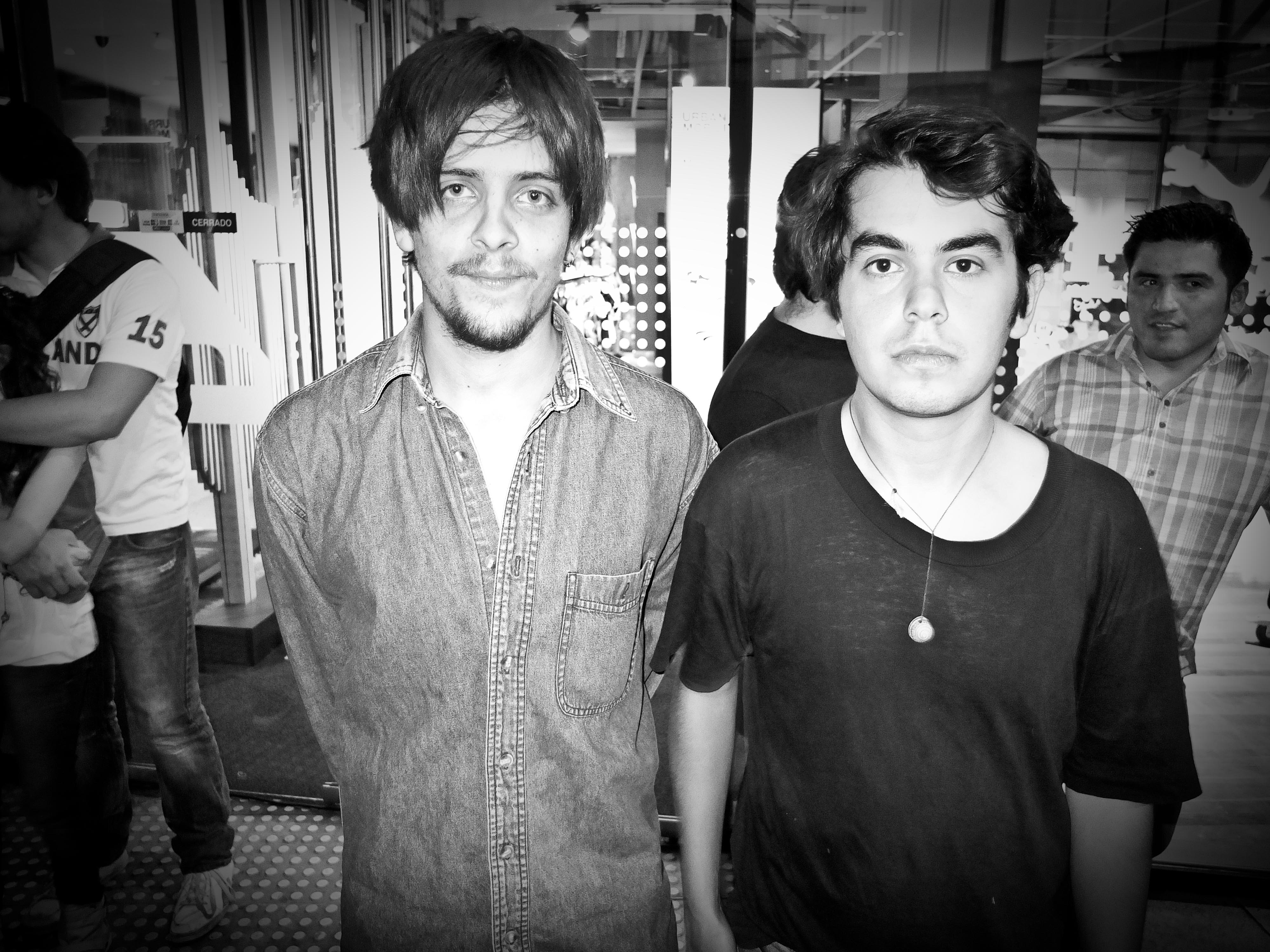
- The Holydrug Couple (2012)

Background information
- Origin: Santiago, Chile
- Genres: Dream pop, Psychedelic rock, Psychedelic pop
- Years active: 2008–present
- Label: Sacred Bones Records
- Members: Ives Sepúlveda: Manuel Parra
- Website: theholydrugcouple.bandcamp.com

The Holydrug Couple is a psychedelic rock duo from Santiago, Chile consisting of Ives Sepúlveda and Manuel Parra.

== History ==
The pair, Ives and Manu, started making music together in 2008, a little over a half-decade after they met. They hadn't seen each other in years when Manu texted Ives to tell him that he'd bought a drum kit. They started jamming and, within a week, they had formed the band.

They released their first album in 2011 titled Awe via BYM Records. Shortly after the release, the band caught the attention of Sacred Bones Records, who signed the band to their label. Later that year, the band released an EP titled Ancient Land. In 2013, the band released their second full-length album and major label debut, Noctuary via Sacred Bones. In 2014, the band released a 7", with Everyone Knows All on the A side and Quetzal on the B side.

In 2015, The Holydrug Couple released their third full-length album (second on their label) titled Moonlust on May 12. The album was a bold psych-rock endeavour that was received with mixed reviews. It's Psychedelic Baby! Magazine described the album as "a step in the evolution of dream-pop, creating a sense of transparentness, space, romanticism, and the need for infusing a sense of clarity and privacy into our very beings." And while the overall score on Metacritic was an underwhelming 58/100, the album later went on to come at no.17 on Happy Mag's list of "The 25 best psychedelic rock albums of the 2010s".

In 2016, the band released their fourth full-length album (second on their chilean label BYM Records) titled Soundtrack for Pantanal.

== Band members ==
=== Live ===
- Ives Sepúlveda (Vocals, Guitar, Bass, Keys)
- Manuel Parra (Drums)

=== Studio ===
- Ives Sepúlveda (Vocals, Guitar, Bass, Keys, Drums, Production, Engineering)
- Manuel Parra (Drums)

== Discography ==
Studio albums

- Awe (2011, BYM Records)
- Noctuary (2013, Sacred Bones)
- Noctuary Demos (2013, BYM Records)
- Moonlust (2015, Sacred Bones)
- Moonlust Demos (2016, BYM Records)
- Soundtrack for Pantanal (2016, Sacred Bones)
- Hyper Super Mega (2018, Sacred Bones)
- Pan (2022, Locus Amoenus)
- Berlin (2023, Sacred Bones)

EPs

- Ancient Land (2011, Sacred Bones)

Singles

- Glowing Summer (2012, BYM Records)
- Everyone Knows All / Quetzal (2014, BYM Records)
- Bed Soundtrack (2015, BYM Records)
- Vértigo/Valle de los espejos (2019, BYM Records)
