= Have a Nice Decade: The 70s Pop Culture Box =

Compilation album by various artists
- Released: June 16, 1998
- Genres: Pop, funk, disco, soul
- Length: 9:12:02
- Label: Rhino

Professional ratings
Review scores
Source	Rating
Allmusic	4.5/5 stars

Have a Nice Decade: The 70s Pop Culture Box is a seven-disc, 160-track box set with a 90-page booklet of cultural comment, a timeline for the decade, and liner notes. While covering much of the same ground as Rhino's Have a Nice Day series, it includes more R&B, funk, soul and disco from the period. It also has several tracks from iconic artists of the era, making this set less of an obscure semi-hits collection than the iconic Have a Nice Day series.

The first copies of Have a Nice Decade released are covered with an iconic shag rug carpeting incorporating the iconic colors, textures and icons that have since become icons of the decade. Some of the tracks include sound clips of the decade, which follow a short silence at the end of the song (but which are still part of the track). The clip is a reference to the title of the next song in the running order. The clips are described below inline with the track it follows, with links to appropriate articles for the events described.

Two additional installments were made in this series, covering the 1980s and the 1990s.

== Track listing ==
=== Disc one ===
1. Edison Lighthouse: "Love Grows (Where My Rosemary Goes)" – 2:53
2. Shocking Blue: "Venus" – 3:06
3. Lynn Anderson: "Rose Garden" – 3:27 Sound clip (begins at 2:47): Patty Hearst's abduction by, and expression of the aims of, the Symbionese Liberation Army
4. The Guess Who: "American Woman" – 3:53
5. Sugarloaf: "Green-Eyed Lady" – 3:40
6. The Ides of March: "Vehicle" – 2:56
7. George Baker Selection: "Little Green Bag" – 3:24 Sound clip (begins at 3:16): Apollo 13 commander Jim Lovell saying to ground control, "Houston, we've had a problem."
8. The Blues Image: "Ride Captain Ride" – 3:09
9. Norman Greenbaum: "Spirit in the Sky" – 4:02
10. Murray Head: "Superstar" – 4:22 Sound clip (begins at 4:03): John Dean, former counsel to President Richard Nixon, testifying before the Watergate Committee
11. Chairmen of the Board: "Give Me Just a Little More Time" – 2:41
12. The Delfonics: "Didn't I (Blow Your Mind This Time)" – 3:23
13. Five Stairsteps: "O-o-h Child" – 3:16
14. The Jackson 5: "ABC" – 2:43
15. Freda Payne: "Band of Gold" – 2:55
16. James Taylor: "Fire and Rain" – 3:54 Sound clip (begins at 3:22): Interview with a member of the Lakota nation during the Wounded Knee Incident
17. The Raiders: "Indian Reservation (The Lament of the Cherokee Reservation Indian)" – 3:27 Sound clip (begins at 2:53): Description of the "Jesus People" of southern California
18. Ocean: "Put Your Hand in the Hand" – 2:57
19. Brewer & Shipley: "One Toke Over the Line" – 3:21
20. Five Man Electrical Band: "Signs" – 3:27
21. Hamilton, Joe Frank & Reynolds: "Don't Pull Your Love" – 2:43
22. Lobo: "Me and You and a Dog Named Boo" – 2:57
23. Cat Stevens: "Wild World" – 3:20
24. Three Dog Night: "Joy to the World" – 3:15

=== Disc two ===
1. Isaac Hayes: "Theme from Shaft" – 3:17
2. Sly and the Family Stone: "Family Affair" – 3:06
3. The Dramatics: "Whatcha See Is Watchcha Get" – 3:33
4. Cornelius Brothers & Sister Rose: "Treat Her Like a Lady" – 2:46
5. The Chi-Lites: "Have You Seen Her" – 4:49
6. Honey Cone: "Want Ads" – 2:47
7. Al Green: "Let's Stay Together" – 3:18
8. Lee Michaels: "Do You Know What I Mean" – 3:14
9. Rod Stewart: "Maggie May" – 5:19 Sound clip (begins at 5:10): Bobby Riggs spouting male-chauvinist views before his celebrated tennis challenge match with Billie Jean King (which he lost)
10. Jean Knight: "Mr. Big Stuff" – 2:30
11. Daddy Dewdrop: "Chick-A-Boom (Don't Ya Jes' Love It)" – 2:51
12. Melanie: "Brand New Key" – 2:26
13. Coven: "One Tin Soldier (The Legend of Billy Jack)" – 3:38 Sound clip (begins at 3:21): Eyewitness account of the Ohio National Guard's shooting of students at Kent State
14. Alice Cooper: "School's Out" – 3:30
15. Hot Butter: "Popcorn" – 2:33
16. Apollo 100: "Joy" – 2:46
17. Helen Reddy: "I Am Woman" – 3:16
18. America: "A Horse with No Name" – 3:50
19. The Staple Singers: "I'll Take You There" – 3:23 Sound clip (begins at 3:15): Vice President Spiro Agnew condemning the 'nattering nabobs of negativism,' in a speech written by William Safire
20. The Main Ingredient: "Everybody Plays the Fool" – 3:39 Sound clip (begins at 3:19): John Chancellor (NBC News) reports the disappearance of former Teamsters' Union chairman Jimmy Hoffa
21. Joe Tex: "I Gotcha" – 2:29
22. The Spinners: "I'll Be Around" – 3:12
23. Bill Withers: "Lean on Me" – 3:42
24. Godspell: "Day By Day" – 3:14

=== Disc three ===
1. Gilbert O'Sullivan: "Alone Again (Naturally)" – 3:39
2. Climax: "Precious and Few" – 2:47
3. Looking Glass: "Brandy (You're a Fine Girl)" – 3:05
4. King Harvest: "Dancing in the Moonlight" – 2:51
5. Gallery: "Nice to Be with You" – 2:38
6. Sammy Davis, Jr. with The Mike Curb Congregation: "The Candy Man" – 3:10
7. Wayne Newton: "Daddy Don't You Walk So Fast" – 3:24
8. Commander Cody and His Lost Planet Airmen: "Hot Rod Lincoln" – 2:44
9. Gary Glitter: "Rock and Roll Part 2" – 3:02
10. Dr. Hook and the Medicine Show: "The Cover of Rolling Stone" – 2:54
11. Carly Simon: "You're So Vain" – 4:20
12. Billy Paul: "Me and Mrs. Jones" – 4:47
13. Curtis Mayfield: "Freddie's Dead (Theme from Superfly)" – 3:27 Sound clip (begins at 3:17): President Richard Nixon announcing 'peace with honor' as the results of the American agreement to withdrawal from Vietnam, reached at the Paris Peace Accords.
14. Maureen McGovern: "The Morning After" – 2:23
15. The Isley Brothers: "That Lady (Pt. 1)" – 3:49 Sound clip (begins at 3:20): Elizabeth Ray on the imminent marriage of her former employer, Rep. Wayne Hays.
16. Barry White: "I'm Gonna Love You Just a Little More Baby" – 4:10
17. Love Unlimited Orchestra: "Love's Theme" – 3:35
18. Kool and the Gang: "Jungle Boogie" – 3:06
19. El Chicano: "Tell Her She's Lovely" – 3:14
20. Stealers Wheel: "Stuck in the Middle with You" – 3:26
21. Dawn featuring Tony Orlando: "Tie a Yellow Ribbon 'Round the Ole Oak Tree" – 3:26
22. Brownsville Station: "Smokin' in the Boy's Room" – 2:58
23. The Edgar Winter Group: "Frankenstein" – 3:27
24. Eric Weissberg and Steve Mandell: "Dueling Banjos" – 2:17

=== Disc four ===
1. The O'Jays: "Love Train" – 2:58
2. Gladys Knight and the Pips: "Midnight Train to Georgia" – 3:58
3. Vicki Lawrence: "The Night the Lights Went Out in Georgia" – 3:35
4. The Doobie Brothers: "Long Train Runnin'" – 3:27
5. Stories: "Brother Louie" – 3:56
6. Todd Rundgren: "Hello It's Me" – 3:30
7. Terry Jacks: "Seasons in the Sun" – 3:44 Sound clip (begins at 3:27): Scientist describing the effects of chlorofluorocarbons on the ozone layer.
8. The Hollies: "The Air That I Breathe" – 3:47
9. Harry Chapin: "Cat's in the Cradle" – 3:39
10. Paper Lace: "The Night Chicago Died" – 3:31
11. Rufus: "Tell Me Something Good" – 3:32
12. Bo Donaldson and the Heywoods: "Billy Don't Be a Hero" – 3:40
13. Styx: "Lady" – 3:31 Sound clip (begins at 2:56): President Gerald Ford pardons disgraced President Richard Nixon for any crimes he may have performed during his administration.
14. James Brown: "The Payback, Pt. 1" – 4:06 Sound clip (begins at 3:32): During the Watergate coverup, President Richard Nixon assures the American public that "their President is not a crook."
15. Linda Ronstadt: "You're No Good" – 3:38
16. Marvin Hamlisch: "The Entertainer" – 3:05
17. The Hues Corporation: "Rock the Boat" – 3:08
18. Carl Douglas: "Kung Fu Fighting" – 3:15
19. Maria Muldaur: "Midnight at the Oasis" – 3:45 Sound clip (begins at 3:31): John Chancellor reporting on an incident of streaking taking place, this time in a police station.
20. Ray Stevens: "The Streak" – 3:16
21. B. T. Express: "Do It ('Til You're Satisfied)" – 3:12
22. Golden Earring: "Radar Love" – 5:04

=== Disc five ===
1. The First Class: "Beach Baby" – 5:05
2. Blue Magic: "Sideshow" – 4:11
3. Bachman-Turner Overdrive: "You Ain't Seen Nothing Yet" – 3:28
4. 10cc: "I'm Not in Love" – 3:58
5. The Jimmy Castor Bunch: "The Bertha Butt Boogie, Pt. 1" – 3:36 Sound clip (begins at 3:13): Muhammad Ali describing The Rumble in the Jungle.
6. Johnny Wakelin and The Kinshasa Band: "Black Superman (Muhammad Ali)" – 3:36
7. Ozark Mountain Daredevils: "Jackie Blue" – 3:37
8. Sammy Johns: "Chevy Van" – 2:58
9. Earth, Wind and Fire: "Shining Star" – 2:53
10. War: "Why Can't We Be Friends?" – 3:50
11. Captain & Tennille: "Love Will Keep Us Together" – 3:24
12. Morris Albert: "Feelings" – 3:56 Sound clip (begins at 3:42): A news report on the delivery of the first test tube baby by Patrick Steptoe.
13. Jefferson Starship : "Miracles" – 3:29
14. Pilot: "Magic" – 3:04
15. The Miracles: "Love Machine, Pt. 1" – 2:58
16. Hot Chocolate: "You Sexy Thing" – 3:31
17. Labelle: "Lady Marmalade" – 3:20
18. David Bowie: "Fame" – 3:47 Sound clip (begins at 3:30): A news report on the 1973 oil crisis.
19. Jigsaw: "Sky High" – 2:50
20. C.W. McCall: "Convoy" – 4:11 Sound clip (begins at 3:47): A news report on the 1976 Philadelphia Legionnaires’ disease outbreak.
21. Neil Sedaka: "Bad Blood" – 3:17 Sound clip (begins at 3:08): Description of the Ford Pinto's unsafe fuel-tank design.
22. Foghat: "Slow Ride" – 3:56

=== Disc six ===
1. KC and the Sunshine Band: "Get Down Tonight" – 3:13
2. The Ohio Players: "Love Rollercoaster" – 2:54
3. The Four Seasons: "December, 1963 (Oh, What a Night)" – 3:32
4. The Bay City Rollers: "Saturday Night" – 2:55
5. Mike Post: "Theme from The Rockford Files" – 3:12
6. Glen Campbell: "Rhinestone Cowboy" – 3:14
7. Silver Convention: "Fly, Robin, Fly" – 3:38 Sound clip (begins at 3:20): A news report on the sentencing of Claudine Longet for killing boyfriend Vladimier “Spider’ Sabich.
8. Electric Light Orchestra: "Evil Woman" – 3:19
9. Diana Ross: "Do You Know Where You're Going To (Theme from Mahogany)" – 3:24
10. Pratt & McClain: "Theme from Happy Days" – 3:15 Sound clip (begins at 2:35): Excerpt from Gerald Ford’s “Whip Inflation Now” speech.
11. Cyndi Grecco: "Making Our Dreams Come True" – 2:31
12. The Bellamy Brothers: "Let Your Love Flow" – 3:17
13. Parliament: "Give Up The Funk (Tear The Roof Off The Sucker)" – 4:09 Sound clip (begins at 3:43): Excerpt from Queen Elizabeth II's speech on the United States Bicentennial.
14. Maxine Nightingale: "Right Back Where We Started From" – 3:16
15. Elvin Bishop: "Fooled Around and Fell in Love" – 2:58
16. Starland Vocal Band: "Afternoon Delight" – 3:49 Sound clip (begins at 3:13): Quotes from Jim Jones shortly before the Jonestown massacre.
17. Gary Wright: "Dream Weaver" – 3:26
18. England Dan & John Ford Coley: "I'd Really Love to See You Tonight" – 2:38
19. Rick Dees and His Cast of Idiots: "Disco Duck (Part 1)" – 3:43 Sound clip (begins at 3:13): Excerpt from Jimmy Carter’s address accepting the Democratic presidential nomination.
20. Vicki Sue Robinson: "Turn the Beat Around" – 3:50 Sound clip (begins at 3:24): A news report of gas shortages caused by the 1979 energy crisis.
21. Rose Royce: "Car Wash" – 4:08 Sound clip (begins at 3:31): Jimmy Carter apologizing for his 1976 Playboy interview.
22. The Andrea True Connection: "More, More, More (Part 1)" – 3:01
23. Firefall: "You Are the Woman" – 2:54 Sound clip (begins at 2:40): A news report on the Viking 1 capturing the first images of the surface of Mars.
24. Steve Miller Band: "Fly Like an Eagle" – 3:01

=== Disc seven ===
1. Peter Frampton: "Do You Feel Like We Do" – 7:46 Sound clip (begins at 7:20): A news report on the Lynyrd Skynyrd plane crash.
2. Lynyrd Skynyrd: "Free Bird (Live Version)" – 4:57
3. REO Speedwagon: "Ridin' the Storm Out" – 3:04
4. Meco: "Star Wars Theme/Cantina Band" – 4:00 Sound clip (begins at 3:34): A news report on the Three Mile Island accident.
5. The Trammps: "Disco Inferno" – 3:35
6. The Commodores: "Brick House" – 3:58 Sound clip (begins at 3:30): Gary Gilmore demanding for his death sentence to be carried through.
7. Marvin Gaye: "Got to Give It Up, Pt. 1" – 4:12
8. Foreigner: "Feels Like the First Time" – 3:22
9. David Soul: "Don't Give Up on Us" – 3:37
10. Dan Hill: "Sometimes When We Touch" – 3:32
11. Stevie Wonder: "Sir Duke" – 3:55
12. Gloria Gaynor: "I Will Survive" – 3:34 Sound clip (begins at 3:17): A news report of the capturing of the Son of Sam.
13. Alicia Bridges: "I Love the Nightlife (Disco 'Round)" – 3:01
14. Little River Band: "Happy Anniversary" – 3:39
15. Eddie Money: "Baby Hold On" – 3:4
16. Warren Zevon: "Werewolves of London" – 3:27
17. Exile: "Kiss You All Over" – 3:31
18. Chic: "I Want Your Love" – 3:32
19. Sister Sledge: "We Are Family" – 4:08 Sound clip (begins at 3:35): A news report on the Iran Hostage Crisis.
20. McFadden & Whitehead: "Ain't No Stoppin' Us Now" – 3:41

== Soundbite listing ==
- Patty Hearst's abduction by, and expression of the aims of, the Symbionese Liberation Army
- John Dean, former counsel to President Richard Nixon, testifying before the Watergate Committee
- Apollo 13 commander Jim Lovell saying to ground control, "Houston, we've had a problem."
- Interview with a member of the Lakota nation during the Wounded Knee Incident
- Description of the "Jesus People" of southern California
- Bobby Riggs spouting male-chauvinist views before his celebrated tennis challenge match with Billie Jean King (which he lost)
- Eyewitness account of the Ohio National Guard's shooting of students at Kent State
- Vice President Spiro Agnew condemns the 'nattering nabobs of negativity,' in a speech written by William Safire
- John Chancellor (NBC News) reports the disappearance of former Teamsters' Union chairman Jimmy Hoffa
- President Richard Nixon announcing 'peace with honor' as the results of the American agreement to withdrawal from Vietnam, reached at the Paris Peace Accords.
- Elizabeth Ray on the imminent marriage of her former employer, Rep. Wayne Hays.
- Scientist describing the effects of chlorofluorocarbons on the ozone layer.
- President Gerald Ford pardons disgraced President Richard Nixon for any crimes he may have performed during his administration.
- During the Watergate coverup, President Richard Nixon assures the American public that "their President is not a crook."
- John Chancellor reporting on an incident of streaking taking place, this time in a police station.
- Muhammad Ali describing The Rumble in the Jungle.
- A news report on the delivery of the first test tube baby by Patrick Steptoe.
- A news report on the 1973 oil crisis.
- A news report on the 1976 Philadelphia Legionnaires’ disease outbreak.
- Description of the Ford Pinto's unsafe fuel-tank design.
- A news report on the sentencing of Claudine Longet for killing boyfriend Vladimier “Spider’ Sabich.
- Excerpt from Gerald Ford's “Whip Inflation Now” speech.
- Excerpt from Queen Elizabeth II's speech on the United States Bicentennial.
- Quotes from Jim Jones shortly before the Jonestown massacre.
- Excerpt from Jimmy Carter's address accepting the Democratic presidential nomination.
- A news report on gas shortages caused by the 1979 energy crisis.
- Jimmy Carter apologizing for his 1976 Playboy interview.
- A news report on the Viking 1 capturing the first images of the surface of Mars.
- A news report on the Lynyrd Skynyrd plane crash.
- A news report on the Three Mile Island accident.
- Gary Gilmore demanding for his death sentence to be carried through.
- A news report on the capturing of the Son of Sam.
- A news report on the Iran Hostage Crisis.
