= Historic Dead =

Live album by Grateful Dead
- Released: June 1971
- Recorded: 1966
- Genre: Blues rock; jam rock
- Length: 28:51
- Label: Sunflower
- Producer: Robert Cohen

Grateful Dead chronology
| American Beauty (1970) | Historic Dead (1971) | Grateful Dead (1971) |

Professional ratings
Review scores
| Source | Rating |
|---|---|
| Allmusic | 2/5 stars |

Historic Dead is a live album by the rock group the Grateful Dead. It was recorded at the Avalon Ballroom in San Francisco, California in late 1966, and released in June 1971.

== History ==
Historic Dead was produced as a vinyl LP on the Sunflower label and distributed by MGM Records. Together Records had purchased the rights to a number of concert recordings from the Avalon, including some by the Grateful Dead, for a planned anthology of Bay Area bands. When the label collapsed, MGM paid the debt owed to the studio and assumed the tapes, releasing two original albums of live Dead material. Historic Dead is therefore not a bootleg album, but the band did not participate in its production. It reached number 154 on the Billboard 200. It has long been out of print, and has never been issued on compact disc.

Historic Dead was preceded by another Sunflower Records album recorded at the Avalon in 1966, Vintage Dead. Both are believed to have been recorded on September 16, 1966.

In 1972 MGM released the compilation The History of the Grateful Dead on their archival imprint Pride. The album (also long out of print) combined all of Vintage Dead with two tracks ("Lindy" and "Stealin'") from Historic Dead and featured a new album cover. It is not to be confused with History of the Grateful Dead, Volume One, an album also known as Bear's Choice.

Cover of The History of the Grateful Dead compilation

== Track listing ==
Side one
| No. | Title | Writer(s) | Length |
|---|---|---|---|
| 1. | "Good Morning, School Girl" | Sonny Boy Williamson | 11:01 |
| 2. | "Lindy" | Jab Jones, Will Shade | 2:49 |

Side two
| No. | Title | Writer(s) | Length |
|---|---|---|---|
| 3. | "Stealin'" | Gus Cannon, Will Shade | 3:00 |
| 4. | "The Same Thing" | Willie Dixon | 12:01 |

== Personnel ==
Grateful Dead

- Jerry Garcia – lead guitar, vocals
- Bill Kreutzmann – drums
- Phil Lesh – bass guitar, vocals
- Ron "Pigpen" McKernan – organ, harmonica, vocals
- Bob Weir – rhythm guitar, vocals

Technical personnel

- Robert Cohen – production and engineering
- Richard Delvy – editing and remixing
- Robert Hickson – album design

== Charts ==
| Chart (1971) | Peak position |
|---|---|
| US Billboard Top LP's | 154 |
| US Cash Box Top 100 Albums | 112 |
| US Record World Album Chart | 138 |
