= Vintage Dead =

Live album by Grateful Dead
- Released: October 1970
- Recorded: Late 1966
- Venue: Avalon Ballroom in San Francisco, California
- Genre: Blues rock; jam rock
- Length: 39:50
- Label: Sunflower
- Producer: Robert Cohen

Grateful Dead chronology
Workingman's Dead (1970)	Vintage Dead (1970)	American Beauty (1970)

Professional ratings
Review scores
Source	Rating
Allmusic	2/5 stars
Christgau's Record Guide	B−

Vintage Dead is a live album by the rock group the Grateful Dead covering songs written by others. It was recorded at the Avalon Ballroom in San Francisco, California, in late 1966 (thought to be September 16, 1966), and released in October 1970.

Vintage Dead was produced without the approval or cooperation of the Grateful Dead. However, it is a legal recording, not a bootleg. A label called Together Records assembled live recordings of various Bay Area bands for a planned anthology. When the imprint collapsed, MGM paid the remaining debt and assumed the tapes, releasing two albums of Grateful Dead material on their Sunflower Records subsidiary. The first, Vintage Dead, reached number 127 on the Billboard 200. Produced as a vinyl LP and long out of print, it has not been released as a Compact Disc.

Vintage Dead was then followed by Historic Dead, another Sunflower Records album recorded at the Avalon in 1966 and released under similar circumstances.

== Track listing ==
Side one
No.	Title	Writer(s)	Length
1.	"I Know You Rider"	Traditional	4:25
2.	"It Hurts Me Too"	Elmore James	4:17
3.	"It's All Over Now, Baby Blue"	Bob Dylan	4:50
4.	"Dancing In The Street"	Marvin Gaye, Ivy Jo Hunter, and William "Mickey" Stevenson	7:55

Side two
No.	Title	Writer(s)	Length
5.	"In The Midnight Hour"	Steve Cropper and Wilson Pickett	18:23

Notes

"I Know You Rider" was later released on So Many Roads (1965–1995).

== Personnel ==
Grateful Dead

- Jerry Garcia – lead guitar, vocals
- Bill Kreutzmann – drums
- Phil Lesh – bass guitar, vocals
- Ron "Pigpen" McKernan – organ, harmonica, vocals
- Bob Weir – rhythm guitar, vocals

Technical personnel

- Robert Cohen – production and engineering
- Richard Delvy – editing and remixing
- Kelley/Mouse Studios – poster design
- John Pierce and Mokelvey – front cover and design

== Charts ==
Chart (1970)	Peak position
US Billboard Top LP's	127
US Record World 100 Top LP's	102
