= Whatever: The '90s Pop & Culture Box =

Compilation album by Various Artists
- Released: July 26, 2005
- Recorded: 1989–1999
- Genres: Rock, pop
- Label: Rhino Records

Whatever: The '90s Pop & Culture Box is a seven-disc, 130-track box set of popular music hits of the 1990s. Released by Rhino Records in 2005, the box set was based on the success of Have a Nice Decade: The 70s Pop Culture Box, and Like Omigod! The 80s Pop Culture Box (Totally), Rhino's box sets covering the 1970s and 1980s respectively.

Whatever includes an 86-page booklet of cultural comment, a timeline for the decade, and liner notes for the tracks included in the set. Many of the 1990s musical styles — rock, pop, rap, alternative— are represented. The collection was packaged with coffee beans and was included in Pitchfork Media's 2010 list of "five absurd CD packages".

== Track listing ==
=== Disc 1 ===
1. "U Can't Touch This" – MC Hammer
2. "Nothing Compares 2 U" – Sinéad O'Connor
3. "No Myth" – Michael Penn
4. "Ladies First" – Queen Latifah featuring Monie Love
5. "Ball and Chain" – Social Distortion
6. "Birdhouse in Your Soul" – They Might Be Giants
7. "Chloe Dancer/Crown of Thorns" – Mother Love Bone
8. "Here's Where the Story Ends" – The Sundays
9. "Gonna Make You Sweat (Everybody Dance Now)" – C+C Music Factory
10. "Groove Is in the Heart" – Deee-Lite
11. "Right Here, Right Now" – Jesus Jones
12. "New Jack Hustler (Nino's Theme)" – Ice-T
13. "I Touch Myself" – Divinyls
14. "Unbelievable" – EMF
15. "Hard to Handle" – The Black Crowes
16. "O.P.P." – Naughty by Nature
17. "Walking in Memphis" – Marc Cohn
18. "It's So Hard to Say Goodbye to Yesterday" – Boyz II Men

=== Disc 2 ===
1. "Silent Lucidity" – Queensrÿche
2. "Into the Drink" – Mudhoney
3. "Girlfriend" – Matthew Sweet
4. "I'm Too Sexy" – Right Said Fred
5. "Calling All Angels" – Jane Siberry with k.d. lang
6. "Only Shallow" – My Bloody Valentine
7. "It's a Shame About Ray" – The Lemonheads
8. "Baby Got Back" – Sir Mix-a-Lot
9. "They Want EFX" – Das EFX
10. "Jump" – Kris Kross
11. "Walk" – Pantera
12. "N.W.O." – Ministry
13. "Shitlist" – L7
14. "Absynthe" – The Gits
15. "Coattail Rider" – Supersuckers
16. "Runaway Train" – Soul Asylum
17. "Little Miss Can't Be Wrong" – Spin Doctors
18. "Dizz Knee Land" – dada
19. "Nearly Lost You" – Screaming Trees

=== Disc 3 ===
1. "Under the Bridge" – Red Hot Chili Peppers
2. "Unsung" – Helmet
3. "Jump Around" – House of Pain
4. "Free Your Mind" – En Vogue
5. "Rump Shaker" – Wreckx-n-Effect
6. "Informer" – Snow
7. "Connected" – Stereo MCs
8. "Detachable Penis" – King Missile
9. "Freak Me" – Silk
10. "Ordinary World" – Duran Duran
11. "If I Can't Change Your Mind" – Sugar
12. "Three Little Pigs" – Green Jellÿ
13. "Start Choppin" – Dinosaur Jr.
14. "The Devil's Chasing Me" – The Reverend Horton Heat
15. "Gone to the Moon" – Fastbacks
16. "My Name Is Mud" – Primus
17. "What's Up?" – 4 Non Blondes

=== Disc 4 ===
1. "Thunder Kiss '65" – White Zombie
2. "Whoomp! (There It Is)" – Tag Team
3. "Broken Hearted Savior" – Big Head Todd and the Monsters
4. "Trust Me" – Guru (with N'Dea Davenport)
5. "Gepetto" – Belly
6. "Eye to Eye" – The Muffs
7. "Gentlemen" – The Afghan Whigs
8. "Leafy Incline" – Tad
9. "Dream All Day" – The Posies
10. "Hey Jealousy" – Gin Blossoms
11. "My Sister" – The Juliana Hatfield Three
12. "Whatta Man" – Salt-N-Pepa (with En Vogue)
13. "Back & Forth" – Aaliyah
14. "If That's Your Boyfriend (He Wasn't Last Night)" – Meshell Ndegeocello
15. "Freedom of '76" – Ween
16. "Cut Your Hair" – Pavement
17. "God" – Tori Amos
18. "Mmm Mmm Mmm Mmm" – Crash Test Dummies
19. "Possession" – Sarah McLachlan

=== Disc 5 ===
1. "Shine" – Collective Soul
2. "Far Behind" – Candlebox
3. "You Gotta Be" – Des'ree
4. "Girl, You'll Be a Woman Soon" – Urge Overkill
5. "She Don't Use Jelly" – The Flaming Lips
6. "M.I.A." – 7 Year Bitch
7. "21st Century (Digital Boy)" – Bad Religion
8. "Sugar Free Jazz" – Soul Coughing
9. "Mockingbirds" – Grant Lee Buffalo
10. "What's the Frequency, Kenneth?" – R.E.M.
11. "Revolve" – Melvins
12. "Buddy Holly" – Weezer
13. "Here & Now" – Letters to Cleo
14. "Good" – Better Than Ezra
15. "Run-Around" – Blues Traveler
16. "I'll Be There for You (Theme from Friends)" – The Rembrandts
17. "Tomorrow" – Silverchair
18. "Not a Pretty Girl" – Ani DiFranco
19. "Carnival" – Natalie Merchant

=== Disc 6 ===
1. "Wonderwall" – Oasis
2. "Birthday Cake" – Cibo Matto
3. "Cumbersome" – Seven Mary Three
4. "One of Us" – Joan Osborne
5. "Caught by the Fuzz" – Supergrass
6. "Sweet '69" – Babes in Toyland
7. "Breakfast at Tiffany's" – Deep Blue Something
8. "Photograph" – The Verve Pipe
9. "In the Meantime" – Spacehog
10. "Woo Hah!! Got You All in Check" (featuring Rampage the Last Boy Scout) – Busta Rhymes
11. "Who Will Save Your Soul" – Jewel
12. "Standing Outside a Broken Phone Booth with Money in My Hand" – Primitive Radio Gods
13. "Cybele's Reverie" – Stereolab
14. "Capri Pants" – Bikini Kill
15. "What I Got" – Sublime
16. "Kung Fu" – Ash
17. "Virtual Insanity" – Jamiroquai
18. "Naked Eye" – Luscious Jackson
19. "Outtasite (Outta Mind)" – Wilco

=== Disc 7 ===
1. "Itzsoweezee (HOT)" – De La Soul
2. "Lovefool" – The Cardigans
3. "Radiation Vibe" – Fountains of Wayne
4. "The Impression That I Get" – The Mighty Mighty Bosstones
5. "Turn It On" – Sleater-Kinney
6. "Bitch" – Meredith Brooks
7. "MMMBop" – Hanson
8. "Brian Wilson (Live)" – Barenaked Ladies
9. "Brick" – Ben Folds Five
10. "Sex and Candy" – Marcy Playground
11. "Walkin' on the Sun" – Smash Mouth
12. "Tubthumping" – Chumbawamba
13. "6 Underground" – Sneaker Pimps
14. "Lullaby" – Shawn Mullins
15. "Slide" – Goo Goo Dolls
16. "Kiss Me" – Sixpence None the Richer
17. "Steal My Sunshine" – Len
18. "What It's Like" – Everlast
19. "Natural Blues" – Moby
