= Sunflower Records =

American record label

Sunflower Records was a Los Angeles, California-based record label founded by songwriter Mack David and music industry veteran Danny Kessler that operated from 1970 to 1972. The label was distributed by MGM Records. Sunflower issued fewer than 30 singles and a dozen albums.

== Albums ==
Early in its operation, Sunflower obtained the rights to some 1966 vintage concert recordings by the Grateful Dead. They issued these as the albums Vintage Dead (SUN-5001) and Historic Dead (SNF-5004), both of which made the record charts. They followed the first Grateful Dead LP with another live set, Live At The Family Dog (SUN-5002) from popular performer Danny Cox, who reminded listeners of the folk era. Another artist was Randy Edelman, who would later find success in writing songs picked up by more famous artists such as Barry Manilow. Edelman's debut album, Sunflower SNF-5005, was released in 1971.

== Singles ==
Sunflower Records' first single, "Song Of A Thousand Voices"/ "You Can Cry If You Want To" (Sunflower 101), was by Fearless Fradkin a/k/a/ Les Fradkin and the third (Sunflower 103) was "Hippie Lady" / "Patty Cake" by the Yummies, both of which surfaced as regional hits in various sections of the US in fall 1970. By the time they reached #105, they came up with a fictitious artist called Daddy Dewdrop, who coupled "Chick-A-Boom (Don't Ya Jes' Love It)" with the children's tune "John Jacob Jingleheimer Smith". Surprisingly, the song "Chick-A-Boom," a wry sexual fantasy put to music, jumped into the national top-10, the biggest hit the label ever had. The Daddy Dewdrop album, which followed the successful single, was a light-hearted, if not lightweight, effort that sealed the fate of Daddy Dewdrop as a one-hit wonder, never to be heard from again. The follow-up single, "The March of the White Corpuscles"/"Fox Huntin'" (Sunflower 111), sank without a trace.

== Other artists ==
Other notable artists on the label included Jasper Wrath, Storm (featuring songwriter Larry Weiss), Tony Scotti, Frankie Laine and R.B. Greaves. The last single to make the charts was Sunflower 118, "Love Me, Love Me, Love" by pianist Frank Mills, which reached the top 50 in early 1972. Mills was to make a top-3 record, "Music Box Dancer," about seven years later on Polydor Records.

== See also ==
- List of record labels
