= Avalon Ballroom =

Music venue in San Francisco

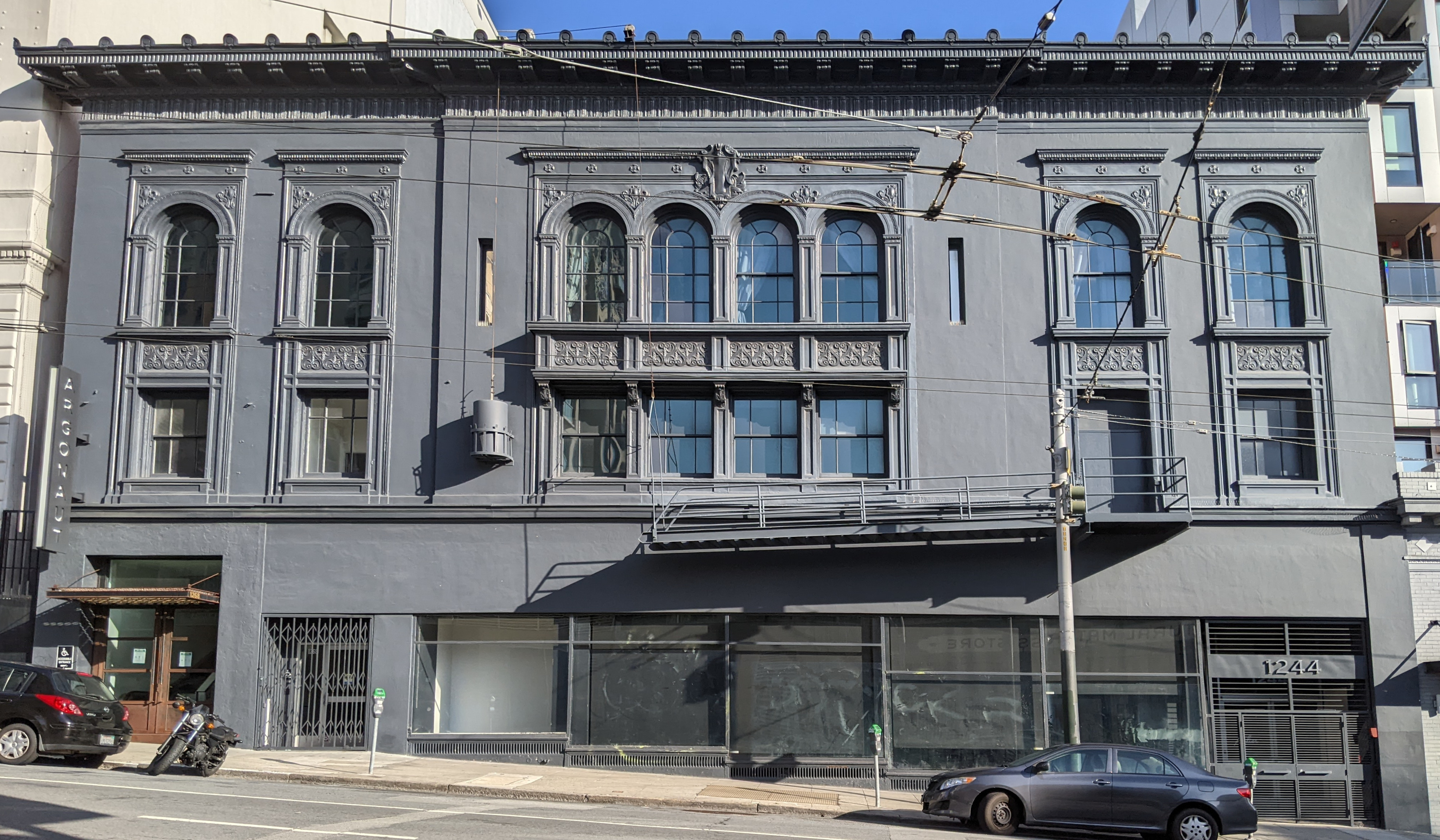
- The building in 2022
- Interactive map of Avalon Ballroom
- Former names: Avalon Ballroom
- Address: 1268 Sutter St.
- Location: San Francisco, California
- Coordinates: 37°47′16″N 122°25′16″W
- Type: ballroom

Construction
- Built: 1911
- Closed: 1969

The Avalon Ballroom was a music venue in the Polk Gulch neighborhood of San Francisco, California, at 1244 Sutter Street (or 1268 Sutter, depending on the entrance). The space is known as the location of many concerts of the counterculture movement, from around 1966 to 1969. It also had a reopening 34 years later, from 2003 to 2005.

== History ==
The building that housed the Avalon Ballroom was constructed as a commercial building in 1911, designed by architect Alfred Henry Jacobs.

By 1915, and at least until 1923, it housed a dance academy called Puckett's College of Dancing, which one source described as "the home of refined dancing. A large turnout could be expected for such monthly events as peanut parties with peanuts and favors for all, a Serpentine Battle, and an informal indoor picnic party."

By the 1930s, a public dance hall called the Avalon Ball Room had opened at 1268 Sutter Street, hosting "popular and old-fashioned dances" five times per week (according to the Federal Writers' Project guide to San Francisco).

In the 1960s, Robert E. Cohen, impresario Chet Helms and his music production company, Family Dog Productions, which had offices on Van Ness, frequently booked bands to perform at the Avalon on Thursday, Friday and Saturday. Posters advertising each event were produced by psychedelic artists, including Rick Griffin, Stanley Mouse, Alton Kelley and Victor Moscoso.

A Liquid light show was often provided by Diogenes Lantern Works.

In the 1960s, at the Avalon, two bands typically performed two sets during the evening beginning at about nine o'clock. Many local bands, such as Quicksilver Messenger Service and the Steve Miller Band, served as backup bands, as did the early Moby Grape and headliners such as The Doors, the 13th Floor Elevators, the Butterfield Blues Band and Big Brother and the Holding Company, which Helms organized around singer and performer Janis Joplin in spring 1966.

The Grateful Dead played at the Avalon at least twenty-nine times from 1966 through 1969, and recorded two live albums, entitled Vintage Dead and Historic Dead, in the autumn of 1966. 2 tracks of their Live/Dead album were also recorded there in early 1969, "The Eleven" and "Turn On Your Love Light."

On January 29, 1967, it hosted the Mantra-Rock Dance musical event, organized by the local Hare Krishna temple, which featured Hare Krishna founder Bhaktivedanta Swami, along with Allen Ginsberg, The Grateful Dead, Moby Grape and Big Brother and the Holding Company, with Janis Joplin.

== Description ==
The Avalon Ballroom occupied the two top floors of the multi-story building at 1268 Sutter. An L-shaped, second-floor balcony surrounded the first-floor along the south and western walls, and the dance area was in front of the elevated stage in the northeast corner where musicians performed. The entrance doors were downstairs, and opened onto Sutter Street.

The Family Dog, at 2125 Pine Street was a hippie commune, which hosted dances and events, eight blocks from the Avalon, frequented by Helms and his friends. The Avalon was not as large as the Winterland Arena or The Fillmore, which had been used by Helms before Bill Graham allegedly violated their partnership agreements. However, the Avalon had the capacity of up to 500. The ballroom was 80 to 100 ft (24 to 30 m) by 160 to 180 feet (49 to 55 m). This area included the stage, which was 40 to 50 feet (12 to 15 m) wide. The dance floor could accommodate several hundred dancers. An omnipresent light show was created by several local lighting companies.

== Closure and restoration ==
The Avalon Ballroom lost its lease in 1968. In 1969, it reopened as the Regency II Movie Theater, operated by Blumenfeld Enterprises until 2000. The neighboring building, known as the Regency I Movie Theater was formerly the Regency Ballroom.

In 2002, after learning from psychedelic poster artist Stanley Mouse that the building was available, neo-hippie Steve Shirley (aka Morning Spring Rain) of the Hog Farm commune restored and re-opened the Avalon Ballroom 34 years after it had been closed. Acts including George Clinton and P-Funk, Robert Hunter, Arlo Guthrie, and Spearhead performed at the reopened venue. All in all, the venue produced 70 plus concerts between 2002 and 2005. The former Avalon Ballroom was later used as the offices for fabric design company American Pacific Linens. In 2012 it became the headquarters of the internet company Wantful.com. The entire former ballroom space was renovated. Starting in August 2013, the building was used as the residence and principal filming location for Real World: Ex-Plosion (2014).

== Pop culture ==
"Combination Of The Two", the opening song of Cheap Thrills, the second album by the Big Brother and The Holding Company, was a homage to the rock ballrooms of San Francisco, and there is a direct reference to the Avalon in the lyrics: "Everybody over at the Avalon Ballroom in the San Francisco Bay". According to Sam Andrew in the documentary Nine Hundred Nights, he wrote "Combination of The Two" for the San Francisco late '60s scene, and "The Two" were The Fillmore and The Avalon.
