= Like Omigod! The 80s Pop Culture Box (Totally) =

Compilation album by Various Artists
- Released: July 2, 2002
- Genres: Rock, pop
- Label: Rhino Records

Professional ratings
Review scores
| Source | Rating |
|---|---|
| AllMusic | 4/5 stars |

Like Omigod! The 80s Pop Culture Box (Totally) is a seven-disc, 142-track box set of popular music hits of the 1980s. Released by Rhino Records in 2002, the box set was based on the success of Have a Nice Decade: The 70s Pop Culture Box, Rhino's box set covering the 1970s. Original release sets had a 3D rubber cover. Later releases had a flat, printed cover.

Like Omigod! includes a 90-page booklet of cultural comment, a timeline for the decade, and liner notes for the tracks included in the set. As does Have a Nice Decade, the tracks tend to be from the lesser-known artists who were one-hit wonders, although music from the best-selling artists of the era are also included. In addition, many of the 1980s musical styles—rock, pop, country pop, new wave, funk, disco and rhythm and blues—are represented.

A majority of the tracks on the first 5½ discs focus on 1980–1985, while the remaining tracks cover the period of 1986–1989.

== Mastering ==
This compilation was produced by David McLees, Bill Inglot and Gordon Skene, and like many CDs of the period, contains very loud and dynamically compressed mastering, so much to the point that many of the tracks pump from the extremely loud "brickwalling" effect that all the tracks have been processed through.

== Track listing ==
=== Disc 1 (21 tracks) ===
1. "Whip It" — Devo 2:39
2. "Video Killed the Radio Star" (Single Version) — The Buggles 3:27
3. "Empire Strikes Back (Medley)" — Meco 3:03
4. "Another One Bites the Dust" — Queen 3:34
5. "Celebration" — Kool & the Gang 3:43
6. "The Breaks (Pt. 1)" — Kurtis Blow 4:09
7. "Let My Love Open the Door" — Pete Townshend 2:44
8. "Call Me" (Single Version) — Blondie 3:32
9. "Keep on Loving You" — REO Speedwagon 3:22
10. "Turning Japanese" — The Vapors 3:44
11. "Lost in Love" — Air Supply 3:54
12. "9 to 5" — Dolly Parton 2:46
13. "I Love a Rainy Night" — Eddie Rabbitt 3:10
14. "Sailing" — Christopher Cross 4:16
15. "Just the Two of Us" — Grover Washington, Jr. and Bill Withers 3:58
16. "Cars" — Gary Numan 3:57
17. "Ah! Leah!" — Donnie Iris 3:43
18. "Sweetheart" — Franke and the Knockouts 3:49
19. "Shake It Up" — The Cars 3:34
20. "General Hospi-Tale" — The Afternoon Delights 4:01
21. "The Stroke" — Billy Squier 3:37

=== Disc 2 (20 tracks) ===
1. "Dancing with Myself" — Billy Idol 3:19
2. "Working for the Weekend" — Loverboy 3:41
3. "Jessie's Girl" — Rick Springfield 3:15
4. "Genius of Love" (Single Version) — Tom Tom Club 3:30
5. "Centerfold" — The J. Geils Band 3:38
6. "At This Moment" — Billy Vera & The Beaters 4:14
7. "Harden My Heart" (Single Version) — Quarterflash 3:37
8. "Hold on Loosely" (Single Version) — .38 Special 3:55
9. "Theme from 'Greatest American Hero' (Believe It or Not)" — Joey Scarbury 3:14
10. "Take Off" — Bob and Doug McKenzie 2:43
11. "Super Freak (Pt. 1)" — Rick James 3:20
12. "867-5309/Jenny" — Tommy Tutone 3:47
13. "Bette Davis Eyes" — Kim Carnes 3:45
14. "Time" — The Alan Parsons Project 4:32
15. "Gloria" — Laura Branigan 4:52
16. "Maneater" — Hall & Oates 4:32
17. "The Theme From Hill Street Blues" — Mike Post 3:14
18. "Valley Girl" — Frank Zappa with Moon Unit 3:48
19. "Da Da Da (I Don't Love You You Don't Love Me Aha Aha Aha)" — Trio 3:25
20. "You Dropped a Bomb on Me" — The Gap Band 4:03

=== Disc 3 (21 tracks) ===
1. "Hungry Like the Wolf" (Single Version) — Duran Duran 4:05
2. "The Look of Love (Pt. 1)" — ABC 3:31
3. "Tainted Love" — Soft Cell 2:42
4. "Rock This Town" — Stray Cats 2:40
5. "Lies" — Thompson Twins 3:14
6. "Words" — Missing Persons 4:24
7. "Don't You Want Me" — The Human League 3:58
8. "Love Plus One" — Haircut One Hundred 3:37
9. "Down Under" — Men at Work 3:43
10. "Steppin' Out" (Single Version) — Joe Jackson 3:47
11. "I Want Candy" — Bow Wow Wow 2:46
12. "Come On Eileen" — Dexys Midnight Runners 4:14
13. "Mickey" (Single Version) — Toni Basil 3:27
14. "Twilight Zone" — Golden Earring 4:51
15. "You Should Hear How She Talks About You" — Melissa Manchester 3:58
16. "Key Largo" — Bertie Higgins 3:07
17. "Pac-Man Fever" — Buckner & Garcia 3:55
18. "Total Eclipse of the Heart" (Single Version) — Bonnie Tyler 5:35
19. "Africa" (Single Version) — Toto 4:19
20. "Goodbye to You" — Scandal 3:47
21. "Puttin' on the Ritz" (Single Version) — Taco 3:25

=== Disc 4 (20 tracks) ===
1. "Jeopardy" — The Greg Kihn Band 3:47
2. "She Blinded Me with Science" — Thomas Dolby 3:42
3. "Electric Avenue" — Eddy Grant 3:49
4. "Sweet Dreams (Are Made of This)" — Eurythmics 3:36
5. "Our House" — Madness 3:23
6. "The Salt in My Tears" — Martin Briley 3:30
7. "Girls Just Want to Have Fun" — Cyndi Lauper 3:53
8. "Talking in Your Sleep" — The Romantics 3:57
9. "Major Tom (Coming Home)" — Peter Schilling 4:12
10. "Always Something There to Remind Me" — Naked Eyes 3:41
11. "In a Big Country" — Big Country 3:55
12. "One Thing Leads to Another" (Remixed Edited Version) — The Fixx 3:24
13. "Der Kommisar" — After the Fire 4:08
14. "Suddenly Last Summer" — The Motels 3:42
15. "Karma Chameleon" — Culture Club 4:08
16. "Let's Go to Bed" — The Cure 3:34
17. "Too Shy" (Single Version) — Kajagoogoo 3:36
18. "Maniac" — Michael Sembello 4:11
19. "Sister Christian" — Night Ranger 4:21
20. "Cum on Feel the Noize" (Single Version) — Quiet Riot 3:27

=== Disc 5 (20 tracks) ===
1. "Owner of a Lonely Heart" (Single Version) — Yes 3:51
2. "Mr. Roboto" (Single Version) — Styx 4:49
3. "I'm So Excited" (Single Version) — The Pointer Sisters 3:50
4. "Back on the Chain Gang" — The Pretenders 3:53
5. "I Want to Know What Love Is" — Foreigner 5:00
6. "Sunglasses at Night" (Single Version) — Corey Hart 3:54 (
7. "Missing You" — John Waite 4:02
8. "99 Luftballons" — Nena 3:53
9. "Tenderness" — General Public 3:31
10. "They Don't Know" — Tracey Ullman 3:01
11. "Heaven" — Bryan Adams 3:58
12. "White Horse" — Laid Back 3:53
13. "Let the Music Play" — Shannon 4:31
14. "Let's Hear It for the Boy" — Deniece Williams 4:10
15. "Cool It Now" — New Edition 4:09
16. "Ghostbusters" — Ray Parker Jr. 4:00
17. "Footloose" — Kenny Loggins 3:44
18. "We're Not Gonna Take It" — Twisted Sister 3:39
19. "Rock You Like a Hurricane" — Scorpions 4:12
20. "The Glamorous Life" — Sheila E. 3:42

=== Disc 6 (20 tracks) ===
1. "Obsession" (Single Version) — Animotion 3:58
2. "Shout" (Single Version) — Tears for Fears 4:06
3. "Take On Me" — a-ha 3:47
4. "Don't You (Forget About Me)" — Simple Minds 4:20
5. "Walking on Sunshine" — Katrina and the Waves 3:59
6. "Voices Carry" (Single Mix) — 'Til Tuesday 4:23
7. "Weird Science" — Oingo Boingo 3:49
8. "You Spin Me Round (Like a Record)" — Dead or Alive 3:17
9. "Miami Vice Theme" — Jan Hammer 2:27
10. "Life in a Northern Town" — The Dream Academy 4:17
11. "Kyrie" (Single Version) — Mr. Mister 4:15
12. "Everytime You Go Away" (Single Version) — Paul Young 4:16
13. "We Built This City" — Starship 4:56
14. "St. Elmo's Fire (Man in Motion)" — John Parr 4:10
15. "Addicted to Love" (Single Version) — Robert Palmer 4:01
16. "Axel F" — Harold Faltermeyer 3:01
17. "Rhythm of the Night" — DeBarge 3:54
18. "You Look Marvelous" — Billy Crystal 3:58
19. "Heartbeat" — Don Johnson 4:17
20. "Everybody Have Fun Tonight" — Wang Chung 4:11

=== Disc 7 (20 tracks) ===
1. "Venus" — Bananarama 3:50
2. "Walk Like an Egyptian" — The Bangles 3:23
3. "Paranoimia" — Art of Noise and Max Headroom 3:18
4. "If You Leave" — Orchestral Manoeuvres in the Dark 4:26
5. "Keep Your Hands to Yourself" — The Georgia Satellites 3:24
6. "What You Need" — INXS 3:35
7. "Walk This Way" — Run-D.M.C. 3:39
8. "Rumors" — Timex Social Club 3:33
9. "Don't Dream It's Over" — Crowded House 3:57
10. "Holding Back the Years" (Video Version) — Simply Red 4:12
11. "I'll Be Loving You (Forever)" — New Kids on the Block 3:57
12. "Tuff Enuff" — The Fabulous Thunderbirds 3:23
13. "Since You've Been Gone" — The Outfield 4:13
14. "Only in My Dreams" — Debbie Gibson 3:52
15. "Never Gonna Give You Up" — Rick Astley 3:32
16. "La Bamba" — Los Lobos 2:54
17. "Wild, Wild West" — The Escape Club 4:06
18. "Don't Worry, Be Happy" — Bobby McFerrin 3:55
19. "Right Here Waiting" — Richard Marx 4:25
20. "Roam" (Single Version) — The B-52's 4:04

== See also ==
- Whatever: The '90s Pop & Culture Box
