= MGM Records =

Defunct American record label

- Parent company: Metro-Goldwyn-Mayer (1946–1972); PolyGram (1972–1982)
- Founded: 1946; 80 years ago
- Founder: Geoffrey Mill
- Defunct: 1982; 44 years ago
- Status: Merged into PolyGram, former music catalog now owned by Universal Music Group, most soundtracks catalog now owned by WaterTower Music (excluding Born Free, owned by Sony Music via Madison Gate Records).
- Distributor: Self-distributed
- Genre: Various
- Country of origin: United States

MGM Records was a record label founded by the Metro-Goldwyn-Mayer film studio in 1946 for the purpose of releasing soundtrack recordings (later LP albums) of their musical films. It transitioned into a pop music label that continued into the 1970s. The company also released soundtrack albums of the music for some of their non-musical films as well, and on rare occasions, cast albums of off-Broadway musicals such as The Fantasticks and the 1954 revival of The Threepenny Opera. In one instance, MGM Records released the highly successful soundtrack album of a film made by another studio, Columbia Pictures's Born Free (1966).

== Background ==
There was also a short-lived Metro-Goldwyn-Mayer Records that began in 1928, which produced recordings of music featured in MGM movies, not sold to the general public but made to be played in movie theater lobbies. These Metro-Goldwyn-Mayer records were manufactured under contract with the studio by Columbia Records.

== History ==
=== Soundtrack albums ===
Their first soundtrack was of Till the Clouds Roll By, a 1946 film based on the life of composer Jerome Kern. It was the first soundtrack album of a live-action film originally issued as a set of four 10-inch 78-rpm records. As in many early MGM soundtrack albums, only eight selections from the film were included on the original version of the album. In order to fit the songs onto the record sides the musical material needed editing and manipulation. This was before tape existed, so the record producer needed to copy segments from the playback discs used on set, then copy and re-copy them from one disc to another, adding transitions and cross-fades until the final master was created. The result was several generations removed from the original and the sound quality suffered. Also, the playback recordings were purposely recorded very "dry" (without reverberation) otherwise it would come across as too hollow sounding in large movie theaters. This made these albums sound flat and boxy.

MGM Records called these "original cast albums" in the style of Decca's Broadway show cast albums. They also coined the phrase "recorded directly from the soundtrack". Over the years the term "soundtrack" began to be commonly applied to any recording from a film, whether taken from the actual film soundtrack or re-recorded. The phrase is also sometimes incorrectly used for Broadway cast recordings.

Among MGM's most successful soundtrack albums were those of the films Good News (the 1947 version), Easter Parade, Annie Get Your Gun, Singin' in the Rain, Show Boat (the 1951 version), The Band Wagon, Seven Brides for Seven Brothers, and Gigi. When the 1939 film The Wizard of Oz was first shown on television in 1956 (by CBS), the label issued a soundtrack album of songs and dialog excerpts recorded directly from the film, as they had done with their LP of music and dialog from Quo Vadis in 1951. Aba Daba Honeymoon, performed by Debbie Reynolds and Carleton Carpenter in the film Two Weeks With Love, became the first soundtrack single to become a national hit, selling a million copies and charting at No. 3.

By 1950, magnetic tape had been perfected for recording use. This markedly improved the sound quality on long play (LP) albums from 1951 forward.

MGM Records also issued albums of film scores, including Ben-Hur, King of Kings, Doctor Zhivago, How the West Was Won, the 1967 simulated-stereo 70mm re-release of Gone With the Wind, and 2001: A Space Odyssey. The Ben-Hur and King of Kings albums were studio recreations of the scores, but done with the original orchestrations, while How the West Was Won, Gone With the Wind, 2001, and Doctor Zhivago albums were the genuine soundtracks. MGM Records also released a second soundtrack album of Quo Vadis, this one containing only music from the film.

Beginning in the 1990s, authentic soundtrack albums of the musical scores to Ben-Hur and King of Kings became available. The Rhino Records editions of these albums featured literally the entire scores, including outtakes. Rhino also released a full-length two-disc album of the score of Gone with the Wind, recorded from the soundtrack in the original mono.

As in the case of the non-musical films, Rhino Records, which obtained the rights to the MGM soundtracks (owned by Turner Entertainment Co.) in the 1990s, issued longer versions of their movie musical albums, containing virtually all of the songs and music. Rhino's license expired at the end of 2011 and the albums Rhino issued were deleted. Warner Bros. now owns the MGM soundtracks first issued by MGM Records and Warner Bros.' WaterTower Music unit now has the rights to release the MGM soundtracks.

=== Record manufacturing ===
MGM operated their own record manufacturing plant at Bloomfield, New Jersey, from 1947 until 1972; pressing not only their own records but a great deal of sub-contract work for other record companies, including Atlantic Records. For several years in the late 1940s-early 1950s, MGM operated a radio syndication business, producing The MGM Theater of the Air and a variety of other series based on inactive movie properties such as Dr. Kildare, Andy Hardy, Maisie, and Crime Does Not Pay. The MGM record pressing plant also manufactured the electrical transcriptions used to distribute the shows to local stations. The record manufacturing division was closed when MGM Records was sold to PolyGram; after which MGM's former competitors began manufacturing records issued by MGM.

=== As a pop label ===

In the early 1950s, MGM Records was considered one of the "major" record companies (besides Columbia, RCA Victor, Decca/Coral, Capitol and Mercury) due to owning its own manufacturing facilities. Subsidiary Cub Records was launched in the late 1950s and Verve Records (predominately a Jazz label) was acquired from Norman Granz in December 1960. Other MGM subsidiaries and distributed labels included: Kama Sutra (from 1965 until Kama Sutra's sister label Buddah Records took over distribution in 1969), Ava, Heritage, Lion and Metro (for budget albums), Leo (children's records), Hickory, MGM South, Pride, CoBurt, L&R, and Lionel.

MGM moved successfully into the rock and roll era with many hit records by Connie Francis, Herman's Hermits, the Animals, the Cowsills, Lou Christie, the Osmonds, and Cub-subsidiary singer Jimmy Jones, whose hits were on MGM in the UK. Pre-rock pop singer Joni James and country singer Conway Twitty also scored hits on the rock and roll charts. James' "There Goes My Heart" in 1958 was promoted as the first 45 rpm record to be released in stereophonic sound. Although it was the first stereo single to come out of the major record companies, edging out the RCA Victor release of Perry Como's "Love Makes the World Go 'Round" by mere days, the single was issued in September 1958, while the first overall 45 rpm records to be released in stereophonic sound were issued by Bel Canto Records in June 1958.

MGM also distributed Cameo-Parkway Records briefly in 1967. Four albums and two singles were released under this arrangement before Allen Klein bought the Cameo-Parkway catalog and renamed the label ABKCO.

Another label distributed by MGM was American International Records, the record label division of American International Pictures, whose film library is now owned by MGM.

=== Country music ===
MGM Records' first president Frank Walker discovered and signed Hank Williams who became the linchpin of MGM Records' country music operations. Other notable MGM artists of this genre include Hank Williams Jr., Sheb Wooley, Conway Twitty, Sandy Posey, Marvin Rainwater, Arthur "Guitar Boogie" Smith, Roy Acuff, Carolina Cotton, Jimmy Newman, Mel Tillis, Marie Osmond, Jim Stafford and C.W. McCall.

=== Classical music ===
MGM Records issued music of a variety of musical genres, but used the same set of catalog numbers. The label also offered a modest catalog of classical recordings beginning in 1951; among them was catalog number E3711, an account of two sonatas by Franz Schubert, billed as the first in a complete cycle, recorded by pianist Beveridge Webster. In 1962, MGM Records picked up American distribution of the prestigious German classical music label Deutsche Grammophon Records. The arrangement lasted until 1969 when Polydor Records established its American office.

=== Sale to PolyGram and phase out ===
MGM Records was sold to PolyGram in 1972. As part of the deal, PolyGram received perpetual rights to the "MGM Records" name and a ten-year license to use the MGM trademark and logo. In 1976, MGM Records, including its artists, was absorbed into PolyGram's Polydor Records. However, PolyGram continued releasing MGM soundtrack albums and reissues using the MGM Records imprint until 1982.

With PolyGram's abandonment of the MGM Records trademark, MGM was able to reclaim its rights to that trademark in 1997.

The MGM Records catalog is now split. Although the first three entities remain under the aegis of Universal Music Group, the pop music catalog is managed by Universal Music Enterprises and first bore the Polydor imprint, with distribution in North America by Republic Records which started using the Republic imprint, the musical theater catalog is now released by Decca Broadway, and the country music catalog is managed by Universal Music Group Nashville with reissues bearing the Mercury Records Nashville imprint.

MGM's film soundtracks are owned by Warner Bros. Entertainment via its WaterTower Music unit and the catalogs of a few other artists also have new owners. Frank Zappa regained control of his MGM/Verve recordings (including those with his group the Mothers of Invention) in mid 1977 after two years of negotiations. Zappa later licensed the recordings to Rykodisc, starting in 1987. In 2012, Gail Zappa licensed her deceased husband's catalogue to Universal Music Enterprises.

=== MGM Music ===
In 1986, MGM formed MGM Music for the licensing of music of which MGM owns the rights. It focuses on licensing soundtracks. It manages the music and music publishing rights of MGM films from 1986 and beyond. (Skydance's Turner Entertainment unit owns the pre-1986 MGM soundtracks.) It also manages the music and music publishing rights of United Artists and Orion films.

== Notable artists ==
- Billy Eckstine
- Bobby Bloom (L&R)
- Chris Bartley (Vando)
- Connie Francis
- Coven
- Crow (Amaret)
- Daddy Dewdrop (Sunflower Records)
- Earl Hines
- Eric Burdon & War (US)
- Erroll Garner
- Every Mother's Son
- Eydie Gorme (also Steve & Eydie duo)
- Five Man Electrical Band (Lionel)
- Friend and Lover (Verve Forecast)
- Frijid Pink (Lion Records)
- Geordie (US)
- Gloria Gaynor
- Grateful Dead (Sunflower Records)
- Harry Horlick
- Herman's Hermits (US)
- Johnny Bristol
- LeRoy Holmes
- Les Fradkin (Sunflower Records)
- Lionel Hampton
- Lou Christie
- Mark Dinning
- Micky Dolenz
- Molly Bee
- Otis Blackwell
- Paul Frees
- Petula Clark (US)
- Randy Edelman
- Richie Havens
- Roy Acuff (Hickory)
- Sammy Davis Jr.
- Shelley Berman (Verve)
- Stan Getz (Verve)
- The Animals (US)
- The Beatles with Tony Sheridan (US)
- The Blues Project (Verve Forecast)
- The Cowsills
- The Five Satins
- The Gentrys
- The Hombres (Verve Forecast)
- The New Seekers
- Tommy Edwards
- Tony Blackburn
- Woody Herman
- Art Mooney
- Bob Lind (Verve Folkways)
- Bobby Lewis
- C.W. McCall
- Davy Jones
- Don Meehan
- Eartha Kitt
- Gary Owens (Pride)
- George Mitchell Minstrels (US, where they were renamed the George Mitchell Voices)
- George Paxton and His Orchestra
- Harry James
- Ian & Sylvia
- Jaime Mendoza-Nava
- Janis Ian (Verve/Verve Forecast)
- Jasper Wrath
- Jaye P. Morgan
- Jerry Landis
- Jimmy Jones (Cub)
- Joni James
- Lainie Kazan
- Larry Norman, MGM/Verve
- Lee Hazlewood
- Lou Rawls
- Michael Parks
- Mike Curb Congregation
- Millie Jackson
- Orpheus
- Roy Orbison
- Sandy Posey
- Steve Lawrence (also Steve & Eydie duo)
- The Impalas (Cub)
- The Incredible Bongo Band (Pride)
- The Louvin Brothers
- The Lovin' Spoonful (Kama Sutra)
- The Mothers of Invention (Verve)
- The Osmonds (also Donny Osmond solo, Marie Osmond solo, Donny & Marie Osmond duo, & Little Jimmy Osmond solo)
- Vaughn Meader (Verve)
- Vincent Lopez
- Wayne Newton
- Andy Starr
- Augie Rios
- Conway Twitty
- David Rose
- Dennis Yost & the Classics IV (MGM South)
- Donn Reynolds
- Elke Sommer
- Frank Zappa (Verve)
- George Shearing Quintet
- Hank Williams
- Hank Williams Jr.
- Jeannie C. Riley
- Jim Stafford
- Jo Ann Tolley
- Joey Heatherton
- John Sebastian (Kama Sutra)
- Johnny Tillotson
- Marvin Rainwater
- Mel Tillis
- Neil Sedaka
- Sam the Sham & the Pharaohs
- Sheb Wooley
- Sister Rosetta Tharpe
- Sopwith Camel (Kama Sutra)
- Teddy Wilson
- The Righteous Brothers (Verve)
- The Royalettes
- The Stereos (Cub)
- The Sylvers (Pride)
- The Tymes
- The Velvet Underground (Verve and MGM)
- Tommy Roe (MGM South)
- Ultimate Spinach
- Walter Wanderley (Verve)
