= Wayne Hays =

American politician (1911–1989)

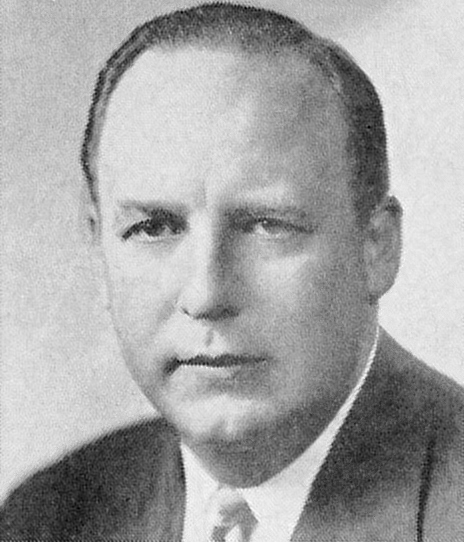

Member of the U.S. House of Representatives from Ohio's 18th district
- In office January 3, 1949 – September 1, 1976
- Preceded by: Earl Ramage Lewis
- Succeeded by: Douglas Applegate

Chair of the Democratic Congressional Campaign Committee
- In office January 3, 1973 – June 18, 1976
- Preceded by: Tip O'Neill
- Succeeded by: James Corman

Chair of the House Administration Committee
- In office January 3, 1971 – June 18, 1976
- Preceded by: Samuel Friedel
- Succeeded by: Frank Thompson

Member of the Ohio House of Representatives from the 99th district
- In office January 1, 1979 – December 31, 1980
- Preceded by: A. G. Lancione
- Succeeded by: Bob Ney

Member of the Ohio State Senate
- In office 1941–1942

Mayor of Flushing, Ohio
- In office 1939–1945

Personal details
- Born: Wayne Levere Hays; May 13, 1911 Bannock, Ohio, U.S.
- Died: February 10, 1989 (aged 77) Wheeling, West Virginia, U.S.
- Resting place: Saint Clairsville Union Cemetery; 40.0858336°N 80.9048731°W
- Party: Democratic
- Spouse(s): Martha Judkins; Patricia Peak
- Children: 1

Wayne Levere Hays (May 13, 1911 – February 10, 1989) was an American World War II veteran and politician who served 14 terms as a U.S. representative from Ohio from 1949 to 1976. A Democrat, he resigned from Congress after a much-publicized sex scandal.

== Early years ==
Hays was born in Bannock, Ohio, the son of Bertha Taylor and Walter L. Hays. He graduated from Ohio State University in 1933. He served as mayor of Flushing, Ohio, from 1939 to 1945 and simultaneously served in the Ohio state senate in 1941 and 1942. Starting in 1945 he served a four-year term as Commissioner of Belmont County. He was a member of the Army Officers' Reserve Corps from 1933 until called to active duty as a second lieutenant on December 8, 1941, with a medical discharge in August 1942.

== Politics ==
While his colleagues might have argued over whether he, as chairman of the House Administrative Committee and the Democratic Campaign Committee, was the second or third most powerful member of Congress, few disagreed that he stood in a class by himself as the meanest man in the House.

— Bud Shuster, 1983

Hays was first elected as a Democrat to the 81st Congress in 1948, and was subsequently elected to thirteen succeeding Congresses. He was chairman of the powerful Committee on House Administration.

Hays received 5 votes for president at the 1972 Democratic National Convention without campaigning for the office. In 1976, Hays ran for the party's nomination for president as a favorite son candidate in the Ohio primary.

Hays's strong rule of the House Administration Committee extended to even the smallest items. In the mid-1970s, lawmakers avoided crossing Hays for fear that he would shut off the air conditioning in their offices.

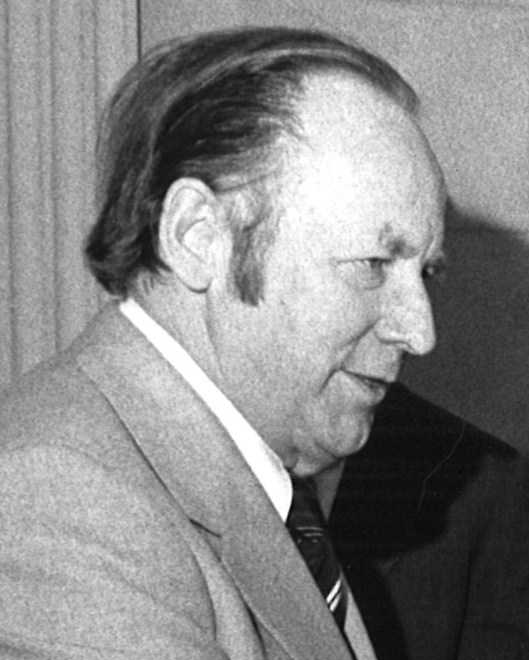
Wayne Hays on April 5, 1973

== Sex scandal ==
In May 1976, the Washington Post broke the story quoting Elizabeth Ray, Hays' former secretary, saying that Hays hired her on his staff, and later gave her a raise as staff of the House Administration Committee for two years, to serve as his mistress. Hays had divorced his wife of 38 years just months prior, and married his veteran Ohio office secretary, Patricia Peak, five weeks before the scandal broke. Ostensibly a secretary, Ray admitted: "I can't type. I can't file. I can't even answer the phone." She even "let a reporter listen in as the Ohio congressman told her on the phone that his recent marriage (to another former secretary) would not affect their arrangement."

Time Magazine reported, "Liz chose to tell her story after Hays decided to marry Pat Peak and did not invite her. 'I was good enough to be his mistress for two years but not good enough to be invited to his wedding,' she pouted." Three days later, Hays admitted to most of the allegations on the House floor, denying only "that Miss Ray's federal salary was awarded solely for sexual services. She was not, insisted Hays, 'hired to be my mistress.'" He resigned as chairman of the Committee on House Administration on June 18, 1976, and then resigned from Congress on September 1, 1976.

Marion L. Clark, a Washington Post editor, who was a member of team that reported the sex scandal, was killed September 4, 1977, when she reportedly walked into a moving small private airplane propeller at the airfield of Iosco County Airport, East Tawas, Michigan.

== Personal life ==
Hays and his first wife had a daughter, Martha Brigitta.

== Later years ==
After leaving office, Hays returned to Red Gate Farm, his 300-acre property in Belmont, Ohio, where he bred Angus cattle and Tennessee Walking Horses. Hays served one term, from 1979 to 1981, as member of the Ohio House of Representatives. In the 1978 Democratic Primary, he defeated Edmund A. Sargus, Jr., a future Judge on the United States District Court for the Southern District of Ohio. Hays was defeated for re-election by future Congressman Bob Ney.

=== Death ===
Hays died at Wheeling Hospital in Wheeling, West Virginia, on February 10, 1989, at the age of 77, after suffering a heart attack at his home.

== See also ==
- List of United States representatives from Ohio
- List of federal political scandals in the United States
- List of federal political sex scandals in the United States

U.S. House of Representatives
Preceded by Earl Ramage Lewis	Member of the U.S. House of Representatives from Ohio's 18th congressional district January 3, 1949 – September 1, 1976	Succeeded by Douglas Applegate
Preceded by Samuel Friedel	Chair of the House Administration Committee; January 3, 1971 – June 18, 1976	Succeeded by Frank Thompson
Ohio House of Representatives
Preceded by A. G. Lancione	Member of the Ohio House of Representatives from the 99th district January 1, 1979 – December 31, 1980	Succeeded by Bob Ney
