= Andy Starr =

- Born: Franklin Delano Gulledge; October 21, 1932 near Combs, Arkansas, US
- Died: September 12, 2003 (aged 70); Fayetteville, Arkansas, US

Andy Starr (born Franklin Delano Gulledge; October 21, 1932 – September 12, 2003) was an American rockabilly musician once described by Billboard as "one of the more noteworthy Presley disciples". However poor song selection and other difficulties made him never chart. Andy Starr recorded on Holiday Inn Records as Frank Starr. He spent time performing in Alaska as Frank Starr, did gospel music, and also ran as a long-shot candidate in the 1996 United States presidential election.
