= Elizabeth Ray =

American former beauty queen involved in 1976 political sex scandal

- Born: Betty Lou Ray; May 14, 1943 (age 83); Marshall, North Carolina, U.S.

Elizabeth Ray (born Betty Lou Ray on May 14, 1943, in Marshall, North Carolina) is an American former beauty queen who was the central figure in a much-publicized sex scandal in 1976 that ended the career of U.S. Rep. Wayne Hays (D-Ohio).

The Washington Post reported that Ray had been on the payroll of a committee run by Hays for two years as a clerk-secretary. During that time, she admitted, her actual job duties were providing Congressman Hays sexual favors: "I can't type, I can't file, I can't even answer the phone." Ray, who had won the title of Miss Virginia 1975 in a beauty contest, says she worked briefly as a stewardess, waitress, and car-rental clerk before beginning work on Capitol Hill in the summer of 1972. Ray also admitted having sex with married Sen. Mike Gravel (D-Alaska) at his houseboat in August 1972. According to Ray, the meeting was arranged by Rep. Kenneth J. Gray (D-Illinois), her boss at the time, in exchange for Gravel's support of a bill Gray was pushing. Both Gravel and Gray denied the accusations, and a federal investigation ended with no charges being filed. Decades later, Gravel admitted to having sex with Ray, but continued to maintain that it was not in exchange for his vote.

After the Hays scandal broke, she authored a book titled The Washington Fringe Benefit. She later posed for Playboy several times and explored acting and stand-up comedy, but these efforts did not develop into a career.

== In popular culture ==
In the 2020 television miniseries Mrs. America, she is portrayed by Hannah Galway.

== See also ==
- Fanne Foxe
- Rita Jenrette
- Blaze Starr
