= Chick-A-Boom (Don't Ya Jes' Love It) =

1971 single by Daddy Dewdrop

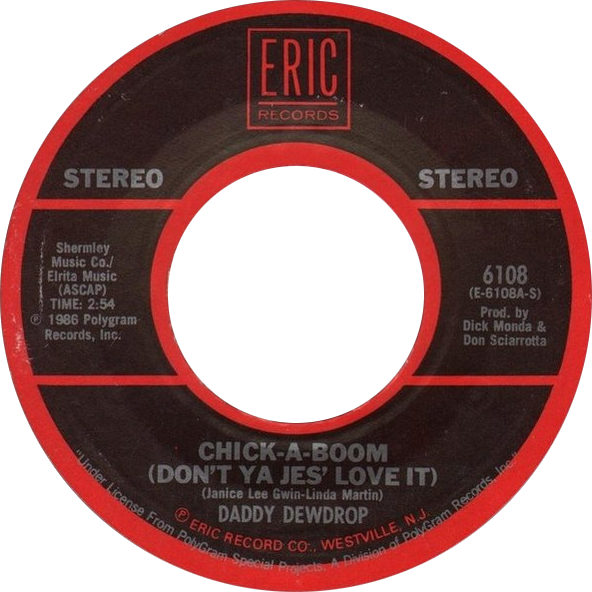
- 1986 US reissue

Single by Daddy Dewdrop

from the album Daddy Dewdrop
- B-side: "John Jacob Jingleheimer Smith"
- Released: February 1971
- Genre: Pop
- Length: 2:40
- Label: Sunflower
- Songwriters: Janice Lee Gwin, Linda Martin
- Producers: Dick Monda, Don Sciarrotta

Daddy Dewdrop singles chronology
"The Bible Salesman" (1969)	"Chick-A-Boom (Don't Ya Jes' Love It)" (1971)	"Fox Huntin' (On the Weekend)" (1971)

"Chick-A-Boom (Don't Ya Jes' Love It)" is a song written by Janice Lee Gwin and Linda Martin and performed by Daddy Dewdrop. It was featured on his 1971 album, Daddy Dewdrop. The lyrics in the verses are spoken, rather than sung.

"Chick-A-Boom" reached number nine on the U.S. Billboard pop chart in 1971. It also reached number five on the Cash Box Top 100.

It was produced by Dick Monda and Don Sciarrotta. Monda produced music for the 1970-71 Filmation animated television series Groovie Goolies, for which the song was originally written and recorded. That version was by the "Rolling Headstones" and was a parody of the Rolling Stones' "Faraway Eyes." The song makes a reference to Little Richard's "Tutti Frutti". The single ranked number 34 on Billboard's Year-End Hot 100 singles of 1971.

== Chart performance ==
=== Weekly charts ===
Chart (1971)	Peak position
Australia Kent Music Report	10
Canada RPM Top Singles	2
New Zealand (Listener)	4
U.S. Billboard Hot 100	9
U.S. Cash Box Top 100	5

=== Year-end charts ===
Chart (1971)	Rank
Australia	84
Canada	45
U.S. Billboard Hot 100	34
U.S. Cash Box	41

== Other versions ==
- Jonathan King, under the name 53rd & 3rd featuring The Sound of Shag released a version of the song in the United Kingdom in 1975 that reached #36 on the UK Singles Chart.
- Ted Knight released a version of the song on his 1975 comedy album, Hi Guys.
