= Daddy Dewdrop =

American songwriter

Daddy Dewdrop is a pseudonym for the American songwriter Richard "Dick" Monda (born 1940, Cleveland, Ohio, United States). He is best known for his 1971 hit "Chick-A-Boom (Don't Ya Jes' Love It)".

== Biography ==
Monda's family moved from Ohio to California in the mid–1940s. He and his sister performed in vaudeville and shows around Hollywood. As a child, Monda appeared in the films The Glass Wall and Go for Broke! At 13, he was chosen to play Eddie Cantor as a boy in the film The Eddie Cantor Story, in which he performed six songs, including dance routines. At 16, he had a featured role in The Midnight Story.

He began songwriting as a young man and received a degree in mathematics.

His first production with Moonglow Records was "Don't Do It Some More", by The Cindermen, credited under the pen name Daddy Dewdrop. After Moonglow, he signed with Four Star Music publishing company where he stayed for seven years. He made most of his recordings during this period. He was signed to Verve Records as an artist and recorded his first album, Truth, Lies, Magic and Faith.

Over the next two years, he produced music for the Saturday morning cartoon series Groovie Goolies (1970), then released the song "Chick-A-Boom", originally written for the show. Monda put together a backing band of studio musicians, including Tom Hensley, who later became the musical director for Neil Diamond, and Butch Rillera, who became a member of the group Redbone and recorded a version of the song, retitled "Chick-A-Boom (Don't Ya Jes' Love It)". The tune, which was distributed by Sunflower Records, became a top 10 hit in the United States, peaking on the Billboard Hot 100 at #9 in 1971 and at #3 on Cashbox. Other charted records include "Fox Huntin' on the Weekend" and "Chantilly Lace", and after a change of labels to Inphasion Records, he had another chart record, "Nanu, Nanu, (I Wanna Get Funky Wich You)" and "The Real Thing".

He appeared in several underground films, including The Michael Girard directed Troma films, Oversexed Rug Suckers from Mars, Body Parts and the indie film The Artichokes.

He recorded an album called Or Durvs under the alias "Lu Janis".

== Discography ==
=== Albums ===
As Dick Monda

Year	Album	Record label
1969	Truth, Lies, Magic, and Faith	Verve Records
1977	Love is an Open Hand	Album World (Sorrentino)

As Daddy Dewdrop

Year	Album	Record label
1971	Daddy Dewdrop	Sunflower Records
1979	Meet the Beat	Inphasion Records

=== Singles ===
As Dick Monda

Year	Title	Peak chart positions		Record Label	B-side	Album
Year	Title	US	AUS	Record Label	B-side	Album
1965	"It Brings on the Pain"	—	—	Moonglow Records	"Days of Pleasure"	
1967	"Blues in the Night"	—	—	Moonglow Records	"Then I'll Go Peacefully"	
1969	"River's End"	—	—	Verve Records	"The Bible Salesman"	Truth, Lies, Magic, and Faith
1969	"The Bible Salesman"	—	—	Verve Records	"A Wandering Carpenter"	Truth, Lies, Magic, and Faith

As Daddy Dewdrop

Year	Title	Peak chart positions			Record Label	B-side	Album
Year	Title	US	CAN	AUS	Record Label	B-side	Album
1966	"She Didn't Have to Tell Me"	—	—	—	Moonglow Records	"If You Treasure My Heart"	
1968	"Here Come the Judge"	—	—	—	Indigo Records	"Collection of Hearts"	
1971	"Chick-A-Boom (Don't Ya Jes' Love It)"	9	2	10	Sunflower Records	"John Jacob Jingleheimer Smith"	Daddy Dewdrop
1971	"Fox Huntin' (On the Weekend)"	—	—	—	Sunflower Records	"The March of the White Corpuscles"	Daddy Dewdrop
1975	"Goddaughter"	—	—	—	Capitol Records	"Dynamite Dyna"	
1978	"Nanu, Nanu, (I Wanna Get Funky Wich You)"	—	15	—	Inphasion Records	"The Real Thing" (Dance #62)	Meet the Beat
