= Philosophy of psychedelics =

Branch of philosophy

Philosophy of psychedelics is the philosophical investigation of the psychedelic experience. While psychedelic, entheogenic or hallucinogenic substances have been used by many traditional cultures throughout history mostly for religious purposes, recorded philosophical speculation and analysis of these substances, their phenomenological effects and the relevance of these altered states of consciousness to philosophical questions is a relatively late phenomenon in the history of philosophy. Traditional cultures who use psychedelic substances such as the Amazonian and Indigenous Mexican peoples hold that ingesting medicinal plants such as Ayahuasca and Peyote allows one to commune with the beings of the spirit world.

== Indian philosophy ==
The Indian yogi and scholar Patanjali in his Yoga sutras (4.1) mentions that mystic powers (siddhaya) can arise from certain "herbs" or "healing plants" (osadhi):

janmauṣadhi-mantra-tapaḥ samādhi jāḥ siddhayaḥ||
The mystic powers arise due to birth, herbs, mantras, the performance of austerity and samadhi.

Later commentators on the Yoga sutras like Vyasa mention elixirs of the asuras, and also state these herbal concoctions can be found in this world. Adi Shankara meanwhile refers to the Vedic drink Soma.

Vajrayana Buddhist Tantras mention the nectar "amrita" (literally "immortal", "deathless") which was drunk during rituals and which is associated in the tradition with 'spiritual intoxication'. A biography of the scholar Gampopa mentions how one of his teachers stated that "You can obtain Buddhahood: by taking a medicine pill which will make you immortal like the sun and moon." This is a reference to the Vajrayana practice of rasayana (Skt: "alchemy") to create certain potions or pills. According to M. L. Walter's study of Indo-Tibetan rasayana, ingestion of these substances were said to "strengthen the yogin and procure the siddhi for him, as well as bringing him to the final goal." According to Chogyam Trungpa (1939–1987), a modern teacher in the Kagyu tradition:

amrita... is used in conferring the second abhisheka, the secret abhisheka. This transmission dissolves the student's mind into the mind of the teacher of the lineage. In general, amrita is the principle of intoxicating extreme beliefs, belief in ego, and dissolving the boundary between confusion and sanity so that coemergence can be realized.

== 19th century ==
European literature such as Confessions of an English Opium-Eater by Thomas De Quincey (one of the first English commentators on Kant) and Samuel Taylor Coleridge's "Kubla Khan" described the use and phenomenal character of mind-altering substances such as opium. De Quincey held that opium allowed one to access the earliest of memories and that therefore no memories were ever truly forgotten:

The minutest incidents of childhood, or forgotten scenes of later years, were often revived: I could not be said to recollect them; for if I had been told of them when waking, I should not have been able to acknowledge them as parts of my past experience. But placed as they were before me, in dreams like intuitions, and clothed in all their evanescent circumstances and accompanying feelings, I recognized them instantaneously […] I feel assured that there is no such thing as forgetting possible to the mind.

Jacques-Joseph Moreau, who reported his experiments with mental patients and drugs, believed that "the hashish experience was a way to gain insight into mental disease."

The French poet Baudelaire wrote about the effects of hashish and opium in Les Paradis artificiels (1860) and theorized about how they could be used to allow the individual to reach "ideal" states of mind. Charles Baudelaire was member of the "Club des Hashischins", a Parisian literary group dedicated to the exploration of altered states of consciousness which included Jacques-Joseph Moreau and literary figures such as Victor Hugo, Alexandre Dumas, Gérard de Nerval, Honoré de Balzac, and Théophile Gautier. Baudelaire's opinion of the drug was generally negative, believing that it weakened and dampened artistic capacities, the personal will and even the very identity of the hashish eater. He compared it to suicide and a false happiness, and saw wine as the true intoxicant of the artists.

In the United States, The Hasheesh Eater (1857), an autobiographical book by Fitz Hugh Ludlow, became popular. Ludlow wrote that a marijuana user sought "the soul's capacity for a broader being, deeper insight, grander views of Beauty, Truth and Good than she now gains through the chinks of her cell." The American William James was one of the first academic philosophers to write about the effects of hallucinogenic substances in his The Subjective Effects of Nitrous Oxide (1882) in which he writes that the gas can produce a "tremendously exciting sense of an intense metaphysical illumination. Truth lies open to the view in depth beneath depth of almost blinding evidence. The mind sees all logical relations of being with an apparent subtlety and instantaniety to which its normal consciousness offers no parallel". He goes on to say that the experience gave him the sense that the philosophy of Hegel was true. In his The Varieties of Religious Experience he likewise writes:

Nitrous oxide and ether, especially nitrous oxide … stimulate the mystical consciousness in an extraordinary degree. … [In] the nitrous oxide trance we have a genuine metaphysical revelation. … [Our] normal waking consciousness, rational consciousness as we call it, is but one special type of consciousness, whilst all about it, parted from it by the filmiest of screens, there lie potential forms of consciousness entirely different.

While it has been speculated that Friedrich Nietzsche had psychedelic experiences brought on by the drugs he used to help with his various illnesses, it is more likely that his drug use was restricted to opium, rather than classic psychedelics. He had, however, speculated on the significance of altered states, particularly with regards to "narcotics potions" taken to attain oneness with one's fellow man and with nature. In The Birth of Tragedy he wrote:

"Now that the gospel of universal harmony is sounded, each individual becomes not only reconciled to his fellow but actually at one with him – as though the veil of Maya had been torn apart and there remained only shreds floating before the vision of mystical Oneness."

== 20th century ==
After using mescaline in 1953, Aldous Huxley wrote The Doors of Perception where he advanced the theory that psychedelic compounds could produce mystical experiences and knowledge, "what the visionary, the medium, even the mystic were talking about" and what Eastern philosophy described with terms like satcitananda, godhead, suchness, shunyata, anatta and dharmakaya. Huxley also quotes the philosopher C. D. Broad, who held that the brain and nervous system might act as a reducing valve of all the stimuli in the universe:

According to such a theory, each one of us is potentially Mind at Large. But in so far as we are animals, our business is at all costs to survive. To make biological survival possible, Mind at Large has to be funneled through the reducing valve of the brain and nervous system. What comes out at the other end is a measly trickle of the kind of consciousness which will help us to stay alive on the surface of this Particular planet.

Huxley wrote that it was possible that certain human beings could, through drugs, meditation, etc. circumvent the reducing valve and experience something far beyond everyday consciousness. This experience Huxley saw as the source of all mysticism, a theory termed the perennial philosophy. He also discusses art and the legality of various drugs in the West as well as arguing for the importance for self-transcendence. Huxley's philosophical novel Island also described a utopian society that used a psychedelic substance for spiritual purposes.

In the early 1960s a group that eventually came to be called "Harvard Psychedelic Club" which included Timothy Leary, Huston Smith and Ram Dass administered psychedelics to Harvard students. The group experimented with psychedelics in experiments such as the Harvard Psilocybin Project. Huston Smith's last work, Cleansing the Doors of Perception, describes the Harvard Project in which he participated.

Ram Dass' Be Here Now and Timothy Leary's The Psychedelic Experience: A Manual Based on The Tibetan Book of the Dead compared the psychedelic experiences to Eastern philosophy and mystical states of consciousness. These books further popularized the idea that Eastern – particularly Indian – philosophical and spiritual insights could be obtained from using psychedelics. One of these experiences described in The Psychedelic Experience is that of ego death or depersonalization.

The idea that the psychedelic experience could grant access to eastern spiritual insights was also promoted by the popular philosopher Alan Watts in his writings such as The Joyous Cosmology, who also argued that one should not remain dependent on them for spiritual growth: "If you get the message, hang up the phone. For psychedelic drugs are simply instruments, like microscopes, telescopes, and telephones. The biologist does not sit with eye permanently glued to the microscope, he goes away and works on what he has seen."

Various psychologists during the 1960s also studied psychedelic substances and worked with psychedelic therapy and later developed various theories about their effects and significance. Stanislav Grof is known for his extensive work in LSD psychotherapy and for developing a theory which stated that the psychedelic experience allowed one to relive birth trauma and to explore the depths of the unconscious mind. Grof observed four levels of the LSD experience, which for him correspond to areas of the human unconscious: (1) abstract and aesthetic experiences (2) psychodynamic experiences (3) perinatal experiences, and (4) transpersonal experiences. Grof defined the last level as "experiences involving an expansion or extension of consciousness beyond the usual ego boundaries and beyond the limitations of time and/or space." The field of transpersonal psychology focuses on this type of experience. Grof included topics such as consciousness, mysticism and metaphysics in his later writings.

The scientist and philosopher John C. Lilly discussed his experiments with psychedelics and altered states of consciousness in The Center of the Cyclone: An Autobiography of Inner Space and Programming and Metaprogramming in the Human Biocomputer. Other psychologists who studied and wrote on psychedelic use include Walter Pahnke, Ralph Metzner and Claudio Naranjo.

According to writer James Oroc, the 1990s brought about a second phase in modern psychedelic culture. The philosophical foundation of this new wave of psychedelic thought was based on the works of Alexander Shulgin, Alex Grey and Terence McKenna.

== Contemporary ==
=== Academic ===
Neuroscientist Rick Strassman has written about his research into the psychedelic dimethyltryptamine (DMT) in his book DMT: The Spirit Molecule (2001). In his book Strassman investigates the possible connection between natural DMT in mystical and near-death experiences and psychedelic states caused by outwardly administered DMT. He also describes the psychedelic experiences of the volunteers in his experiments and their encounter with certain strange "beings" after being administered DMT.

The philosopher Thomas Metzinger has discussed the effects of substances such as LSD, dimethyltryptamine, and mescaline in his Being No One (2003) and those of psilocybin in The Ego Tunnel (2009). Metzinger describes the hallucinatory component of the psychedelic experience as "epistemically vacuous", i.e., not a reliable source of knowledge.

In 2012, University of California Press published the book Neuropsychedelia by anthropologist Nicolas Langlitz. In this book, Langlitz recounts the findings of his fieldwork following scientists involved in reviving scientific research on psychedelics as well as his own philosophical reflections. He explains that Aldous Huxley's view expressed in The Doors of Perception—of the brain as a "reducing valve" which when released by the ingestion of a psychedelics produces a "perennial" mystical experience—has been very influential among contemporary psychopharmacologists. These scientists, Langlitz writes, have given Huxley's view a materialist "neurobiological reinterpretation" which Langlitz calls "mystic materialism".

In 2021, the philosopher Chris Letheby's book Philosophy of Psychedelics was published by Oxford University Press. Philosophy of Psychedelics is organised as a defence against what Letheby calls the "Comforting Delusion Objection" to psychedelic therapy. The objection is that psychedelic therapy works by inducing non-naturalistic metaphysical beliefs, and so it is epistemically deficient if one adopts a philosophically naturalistic world-view. Letheby concludes that the Comforting Delusion Objection fails, and that the epistemic status of psychedelic therapy, given philosophical naturalism, is good.

In 2022, Christine Hauskeller and Peter Sjöstedt-Hughes' edited volume, Philosophy and Psychedelics: Frameworks for Exceptional Experience was published by Bloomsbury Academic.

Other contemporary academics writing on the philosophy of psychedelics include Sarah Lane Ritchie, Aidan Lyon, and Anya Farennikova.

=== Popular ===
In his non-academic encyclopedia of psychedelic culture and thought Psychedelia (2012), Patrick Lundborg developed a psychedelic philosophy he called "Unified Psychedelic Theory" (UPT) which draws from Platonism, the phenomenology of Husserl and Merleau-Ponty, Paul D. MacLean's Triune brain theory, the work of Eugen Fink, and other thinkers.

The American author Sam Harris discussed his use of psychedelics in his 2014 book Waking Up: A Guide to Spirituality Without Religion, which argues for a naturalized spirituality.

The philosopher Peter Sjöstedt-Hughes' book Noumenautics was published by the independent publisher Psychedelic Press in 2015 and discusses psychedelic phenomenology and its metaphysical implications. In 2021 they published his Modes of Sentience covering similar themes.

== See also ==
- Cognitive liberty
- Psychedelic art
- Psychedelic literature
- Psychedelics and ecology
- Psychedelic therapy
- Psychonautics
