= Psychonautics =

Research on altered states of consciousness

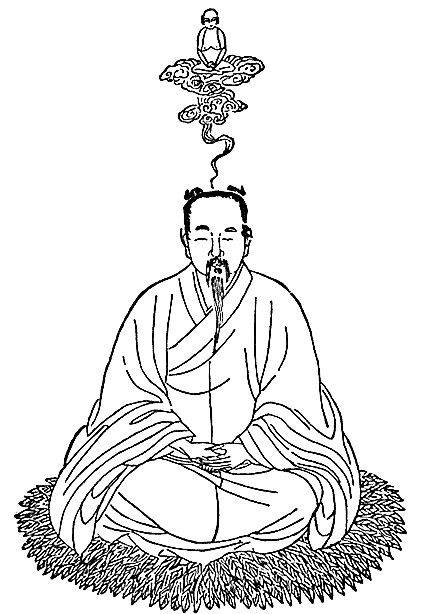
Illustration from The Secret of the Golden Flower, a Chinese book of alchemy and meditation.

Psychonautics (from the Ancient Greek ψυχή psychē 'soul, spirit, mind' and ναύτης naútēs 'sailor, navigator') refers both to a methodology for describing and explaining the subjective effects of altered states of consciousness, including those induced by meditation or mind-altering substances, and to a research group in which the researcher voluntarily immerses themself in an altered mental state in order to explore the accompanying experiences.

The term has been applied diversely, to cover all activities by which altered states are induced and utilized for spiritual purposes or the exploration of the human condition, including shamanism, lamas of the Tibetan Buddhist tradition, the Siddhars of Ancient India, sensory deprivation, and archaic/modern drug users who use entheogenic substances in order to gain deeper insights and spiritual experiences. Self-experimentation of psychedelics in groups may foster innovation of alternative medication treatment. A person who uses altered states for such exploration is known as a psychonaut.

== Etymology and categorization ==
The term psychonautics derives from the prior term psychonaut, which began appearing in North American works in the late 1950s. The first reference that corresponds to contemporary usages of the term was in the 1965 edition of the Group Psychotherapy journal. A 1968 magazine, Beyond Baroque, refers to Timothy Leary as a psychonaut.

German author Ernst Jünger describes ideas related to psychonautics - in reference to Arthur Heffter - in his 1970 essay on his own extensive drug experiences Annäherungen: Drogen und Rausch (literally: "Approaches: Drugs and Inebriation"). In this essay, Jünger draws many parallels between drug experience and physical exploration—for example, the danger of encountering hidden "reefs."

Peter J. Carroll made Psychonaut the title of a 1982 book on the experimental use of meditation, ritual and drugs in the experimental exploration of consciousness and of psychic phenomena, or "chaos magic".

The term's first published use in a scholarly context is attributed to ethnobotanist Jonathan Ott, in 2001.

=== Definition and usage ===
Clinical psychiatrist Jan Dirk Blom describes psychonautics as denoting "the exploration of the psyche by means of techniques such as lucid dreaming, brainwave entrainment, sensory deprivation, and the use of hallucinogens or entheogens, and a psychonaut as one who "seeks to investigate their mind using intentionally induced altered states of consciousness" for spiritual, scientific, or research purposes.

Psychologist Dr. Elliot Cohen of Leeds Beckett University and the UK Institute of Psychosomanautics defines psychonautics as "the means to study and explore consciousness (including the unconscious) and altered states of consciousness; it rests on the realization that to study consciousness is to transform it." He associates it with a long tradition of historical cultures worldwide. Leeds Beckett University offers a module in Psychonautics and may be the only university in the UK to do so.

American Buddhist writer Robert Thurman depicts the Tibetan Buddhist master as a psychonaut, stating that "Tibetan lamas could be called psychonauts, since they journey across the frontiers of death into the in-between realm."

=== Categorization ===
The aims and methods of psychonautics, when state-altering substances are involved, is commonly distinguished from recreational drug use by research sources. Psychonautics as a means of exploration need not involve drugs, and may take place in a spiritual context with an established history. Cohen considers psychonautics closer in its association to wisdom traditions and other transpersonal and integral movements.

However, there is considerable overlap with modern drug use and due to its modern close association with psychedelics and other drugs, it is also studied in the context of drug abuse from a perspective of addiction, the drug abuse market and online psychology, and studies into existing and emerging drugs within toxicology.

== Methods ==
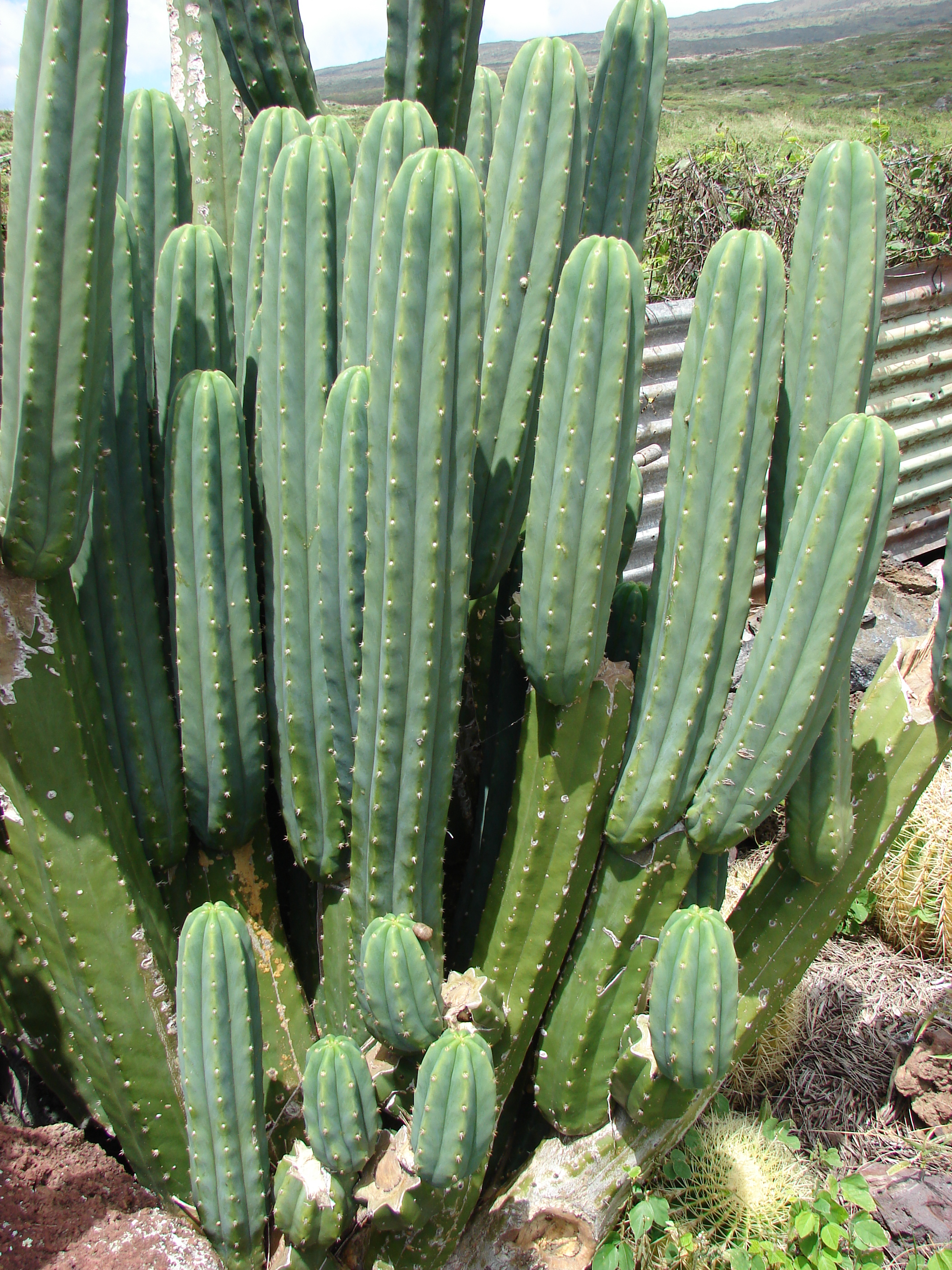
The mescaline-containing San Pedro cactus (Echinopsis pachanoi) has been used for healing and religious divination in the Andes Mountains region for over 3000 years.

- Hallucinogens, oneirogens, and especially psychedelics such as peyote, psilocybin mushrooms, LSD and DMT, but also dissociatives and atypical psychedelics such as ketamine, dextromethorphan, Tabernanthe iboga, Amanita muscaria, Salvia divinorum, MDMA, and Cannabis
- Icaros, which are the songs (i.e. something verbal that is ordinarily perceived as an auditory sensation) the Ayahuasceros sing to induce pictorial representations, rich tapestries of colors and patterns that are visually seen by the listener. (See: synesthesia) The ayahuasca ingredient, harmine, was once known as telepathine because of this group-facilitated activity of singing icaros and the shared perception it cultivates. A shaman who is one of the Ayahuascero people is expected to memorize as many icaros as they can.
- Disruption of psychological and physiological processes required for usual mental states - sleep deprivation, fasting, sensory deprivation, oxygen deprivation/smoke inhalation, holotropic breathwork
- Ritual, both as a means of inducing an altered state, and also for practical purposes of grounding and of obtaining suitable focus and intention
- Dreaming, in particular lucid dreaming in which the person retains a degree of volition and awareness, and dream journals
- Hypnosis
- Meditation
- Meditative or trance inducing dance, like Sufi whirling can also be used to induce altered state of consciousness
- Prayer
- Biofeedback and other devices that change neural activity in the brain (brainwave entrainment) by means of light, sound, or electrical impulses, including: mind machines, dreamachines, binaural beats, and cranial electrotherapy stimulation
- Guided Imagery and Music (GIM) refers to all forms of music-imaging in an expanded state of consciousness, including not only the specific individual and group forms that music therapist and researcher Helen Bonny developed, but also all variations and modifications in those forms created by her followers.

These may be used in combination; for example, traditions such as shamanism may combine ritual, fasting, and hallucinogenic substances.

== Works and notable figures ==
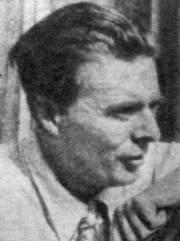
Aldous Huxley (1894–1963)

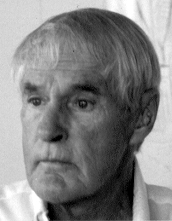
Timothy Leary (1920–1996)

Two iconic psychonautical researchers and advocates of the 20th century.

Works such as Confessions of an English Opium-Eater by Thomas De Quincey, The Hasheesh Eater by Fitz Hugh Ludlow, and On Hashish by Walter Benjamin have psychonautic elements insofar as they explore human and drug-induced experiences. They may be considered precursors to psychonautic literature, but they are not psychonautic works in their own right.

One of the best known psychonautic works is Aldous Huxley's The Doors of Perception, which recounts his experience after taking 400mg of mescaline. The American physician, neuroscientist, psychoanalyst, philosopher, writer and inventor John C. Lilly was a well-known psychonaut. Lilly was interested in the nature of consciousness and, amongst other techniques, he used isolation tanks in his research.

Ken Kesey is an author well-known for accounts of his experimentation with psychedelic drugs. Philosophical- and Science-fiction author Philip K. Dick has also been described as a psychonaut for several of his works such as The Three Stigmata of Palmer Eldritch.

Another influential figure is the psychologist and writer Timothy Leary. Leary is known for controversial talks and research on the subject; he wrote several books including The Psychedelic Experience. Another widely known name is that of American philosopher, ethnobotanist, lecturer, and author Terence McKenna. McKenna spoke and wrote about subjects including psychedelic drugs, plant-based entheogens, shamanism, metaphysics, alchemy, language, culture, technology, and the theoretical origins of human consciousness.

In the early 21st century, ayahuasca practice in the Amazon became increasingly linked to psychonautic exploration. Hamilton Souther, an American ayahuasquero, is known for his work with ayahuasca at Blue Morpho in Peru, gaining recognition through international media coverage and later for his books describing his apprenticeship in Amazonian shamanism.

American philosopher and neuroscientist Sam Harris has extensively discussed and written about the spiritual properties of psychedelics, notably in the 2014 book Waking Up: A Guide to Spirituality Without Religion.

Among the most influential figures are undoubtedly Alexander Shulgin and Ann Shulgin who together authored PiHKAL and TiHKAL, a pair of books which contain fictionalized autobiographies and detailed notes on over 230 psychoactive compounds. Some present-day psychonauts refer to themselves as "Shulginists" to denote a belief in the principles they identify in Shulgins' work.

== See also ==
- Astral projection
- Drug culture
- Higher consciousness
- List of psychoactive drugs
- Mind at Large
- Oneironautics
- Psychedelic experience
- Psychedelic replication
- PsychonautWiki
- Responsible drug use
- Personal science
- Quantified self
- Self-experimentation
- Seth Roberts
- Subjective Effect Index
- Trip report
- Trip killer
