= PsychonautWiki =

Recreational drug information website

- Formation: 2013 (13 years ago)
- Founders: Josie Kins
- Purpose: Drug education; Responsible drug use; Harm reduction
- Key people: Josie Kins (former), Kenan Sulayman (current)
- Website: psychonautwiki.org encyclopediapsychonautica.org
- Formerly called: Encyclopedia Psychonautica

PsychonautWiki (PW) is a major drug information website and resource written for recreational drug users. It is a community-driven wiki and has academic-style encyclopedic articles on psychoactive drugs as well as other related content like experience reports. The site has been described as the largest dedicated psychoactive drug encyclopedia on the web, with more than 300 entries for hallucinogens alone and about half a million visitors per month in 2018. In addition to drug education, PsychonautWiki advocates responsible drug use and harm reduction.

The site was founded by Josie Kins in 2013. It was originally named Encyclopedia Psychonautica. One of Kins's projects, the Subjective Effect Index (SEI), is integrated into PsychonautWiki. Kins says that she lost control of PsychonautWiki and left the site in 2017. She now works as a psychedelic phenomenologist at the pharmaceutical company Mindstate Design Labs. Since 2017, PsychonautWiki has been run by a software engineer named Kenan Sulayman. While advocating for responsible drug use and harm reduction, some of PsychonautWiki's own contributors have struggled with harm from use of drugs, for instance one major contributor passing away from an overdose and another developing symptoms of psychosis.

PsychonautWiki has posted extensive dosing information for psychoactive drugs. It also includes experience reports (also known as "trip reports") and psychedelic replications. Along with that on other sites like Erowid, TripSit, Bluelight, and various Reddit subreddits, the information on PsychonautWiki has often been cited, reproduced, and/or analyzed in the scientific literature as part of research into psychoactive drugs as well as into novel designer drugs (also known as novel psychoactive substances or NPS). Researchers have solicited recreational drug users from PsychonautWiki and related sites for research purposes as well.

The site has been described by some users as the "new Erowid", but others have questioned the trustworthiness of its information.

== See also ==
- Erowid
- Bluelight (web forum)
