= Kins =

Kins may refer to:

== People ==
- Ian Kinsler, nicknamed Kins (born 1982), American baseball player
- Josie Kins, a psychedelic drug researcher and content creator

== Organisations ==
- KINS-FM, a radio station (106.3 FM) licensed to serve Blue Lake, California, United States
- Korea Institute of Nuclear Safety (KINS)

== Toys ==
- The Koosh Kins, a variation on Koosh ball

== Places ==
- Creech Air Force Base (IATA INS, ICAO KINS)
