= Trip report =

Written account of a psychedelic drug's effects

A trip report, also known as a psychedelic experience report, is a written account of a subjective psychedelic experience by a person who has taken a psychedelic or other hallucinogenic drug. They are often published on online websites like Erowid, Bluelight, Lycaeum, Drugs Forum, and Reddit, among others, with Erowid's Experience Vaults containing thousands of trip reports.

Among the most famous trip reports are those of chemist Albert Hofmann when he discovered LSD, including Bicycle Day (April 19, 1943) and his initial accidental lower-dose exposure a few days earlier on April 16, 1943. Writer Aldous Huxley's The Doors of Perception (1954) is a book-length trip report about his first experience with mescaline that was administered to him by psychiatrist Humphrey Osmond. Chemist Alexander Shulgin's books PiHKAL (1991) and TiHKAL (1997) contain short trip reports for hundreds of psychedelic drugs.

In the 2020s, researchers have started to analyze trip reports as part of scientific research into the effects of psychedelics. As an example, the pharmaceutical company Mindstate Design Labs processed 70,000 online trip reports with artificial intelligence (AI) and selected 5-MeO-MiPT as a candidate with unique subjective effects for development as a potential pharmaceutical medication.

== See also ==
- Psychonautics
- Der Meskalinrausch (Mescaline Intoxication) (1927)
- Mescal: The 'Divine' Plant and Its Psychological Effects (1928)
- Josie Kins
- Subjective Effect Index
- Psychedelic replication
