= Subjective Effect Index =

Classification of recreational drug effects

- Website type: Documentation and classification (of hallucinogen effects)
- Creators: Josie Kins; Mindstate Design Labs
- Website: www.effectindex.com
Other names	SEI; Effect Index; Emergent Subjective Effect Index; ESEI; Emergent Effect Index

The Subjective Effect Index (SEI), or simply Effect Index, is a formalized documentation and granular classification system of the subjective effects of hallucinogens, for instance of serotonergic psychedelics like LSD, psilocybin, mescaline, and dimethyltryptamine (DMT). It has the aim of developing a universal terminology set for discussing and describing these effects. In addition to text descriptions, the SEI also includes image, video, and audio replications of hallucinogen effects.

The SEI contains 233 different effects in total, including 52 different visual effects. The effects are divided into three groups: physical effects, sensory effects, and cognitive effects. The visual effects in the SEI have been described as more rigorous, whereas cognitive and emotional effects have been harder to define. Some examples of specific SEI effects include diffraction, increased pareidolia, double vision, texture liquidation, ego dissolution, sedation, tactile enhancement, spontaneous bodily sensations, changes in felt gravity, nausea, appetite suppression, and increased heart rate, among others.

The SEI was developed by Josie Kins starting in 2011 and was publicly launched as a dedicated website in 2017. It has been described as an informal classification system and "citizen science" project. According to Kins, the effects in the SEI were essentially based on her own experiences and those of her friends, and hence are anecdotal in nature. She began working on the SEI after having her first psychedelic experience and wanting to learn more about the effects of psychedelics, but discovering, to her surprise, that nothing satisfactory and comprehensive in systematically describing these effects existed.

Subsequent to its original version, Kins began working at the psychedelic pharmaceutical company Mindstate Design Labs in 2021 and professionally developed an expanded and more rigorous version of the SEI. This is known as the Emergent Subjective Effect Index (ESEI) and was developed around 2023. It is intended to be more precise and comprehensive than the SEI, including over 600 distinct effects. In addition, the project incorporates other classification systems of hallucinogenic effects and inter-translates all of the different terms in these systems. It was developed in part through artificial intelligence (AI)-based processing of tens of thousands of trip reports. The ESEI is said to be confidential and company property of Mindstate Design Labs, having yet to be released, but is said to be non-patentable and will eventually be open-sourced.

The SEI is integrated into PsychonautWiki, an online encyclopedia of psychoactive drugs that was also founded by Kins. She has also used the SEI to inform creation of psychedelic replications and in the development of an informal psychedelic experience intensity scale. The SEI has been used and cited as a reference in the formal scientific literature as well. The ESEI is used at Mindstate Design Labs for purposes of assisting in correlation of different psychedelic effects with specific receptor interactions.

Another notable approach to investigating the effects of hallucinogens besides classification systems like the SEI is through the use of psychometric scales, such as the Altered States of Consciousness Scale (ASC) and the Hallucinogen Rating Scale (HRS).

== See also ==
- Psychedelic experience
- Psychonautics
- Trip report
- Psychedelic replication
- List of hallucinogen scales
