= Psychedelics and ecology =

Researchers have noted the relationship between psychedelics and ecology, particularly in relation to the altered states of consciousness (ASC) produced by psychedelic drugs and the perception of interconnectedness expressed through ecological ideas and themes produced by the psychedelic experience. This is felt through the direct experience of the unity of nature and the environment of which the individual is no longer perceived as separate but intimately connected and embedded inside.

Swiss chemist Albert Hofmann, the first person to synthesize LSD, believed that the drug made one aware and sensitive to "the magnificence of nature and of the animal and plant kingdom" and the role of humanity in relation to nature. Stanley Krippner and David Luke have speculated that "the consumption of psychedelic substances leads to an increased concern for nature and ecological issues". As a result, American psychologist Ralph Metzner and several others have argued that psychedelic drug use was the impetus for the modern ecology movement in the late 1960s.

== Terminology and assessment ==
In the context of the psychedelic experience, the term ecology is used to refer to two concepts: how organisms relate to themselves and their environment and the concept of the political movement that seeks to protect the environment. The psychedelic experience is said to result in the direct realization of the fundamental concept of interconnectedness such as the kind found in ecological relationships. Subjects undergoing an LSD psychedelic therapy session in a controlled, laboratory setting report boundary dissolution and the feeling of unity with nature during a psychedelic peak experience. Vollenweider & Kometer (2010) note that measuring the "feelings of unity with the environment" can now be reliably assessed using the five-dimensional altered states of consciousness rating scale (5D-ASC) of which "oceanic boundlessness" is the primary dimension. Research by Lerner & Lyvers (2006) and Studerus et al. (2010) show that the self-reported values and beliefs of psychedelic drug users indicate a higher concern for the environment than both non-users and users of other illegal drugs. It is unclear from the research whether the concern for the environment preceded the psychedelic experience or came about as a result of it. Conversely, Lester Grinspoon reports that ecological awareness may result in psychedelic drug users forgoing the drug and non-users staying away from it entirely to remain "pure". In other words, ecological awareness may not precipitate psychedelic drug use, but may actually discourage it.

== History ==
It is likely that humans have consumed psychoactive plants in the ritual context of shamanism for thousands of years prior to the advent of Western civilization and the supplanting of indigenous cultural values. Anthropological archaeologist Gerardo Reichel-Dolmatoff studied the shamanic rituals of the indigenous Tucano people of South America and found that their shamanic practices primarily served to maintain ecological balance in the rainforest habitat. Experts speculate that the ecological values of shamanism are an attribute of the psychedelic experience.

Those who ingest psychoactive drugs often report similar experiences of ecological awareness. Swiss chemist Albert Hofmann, Norwegian philosopher Arne Næss, British religious studies scholar Graham Harvey, and American mycologist Paul Stamets have all written about the shared ecological message of the psychedelic experience. The back-to-the-land movement and the creation of rural intentional communities by the hippie counterculture of the 1960s was in part due to the wide use of psychedelic drugs which people felt helped them get in touch with nature.

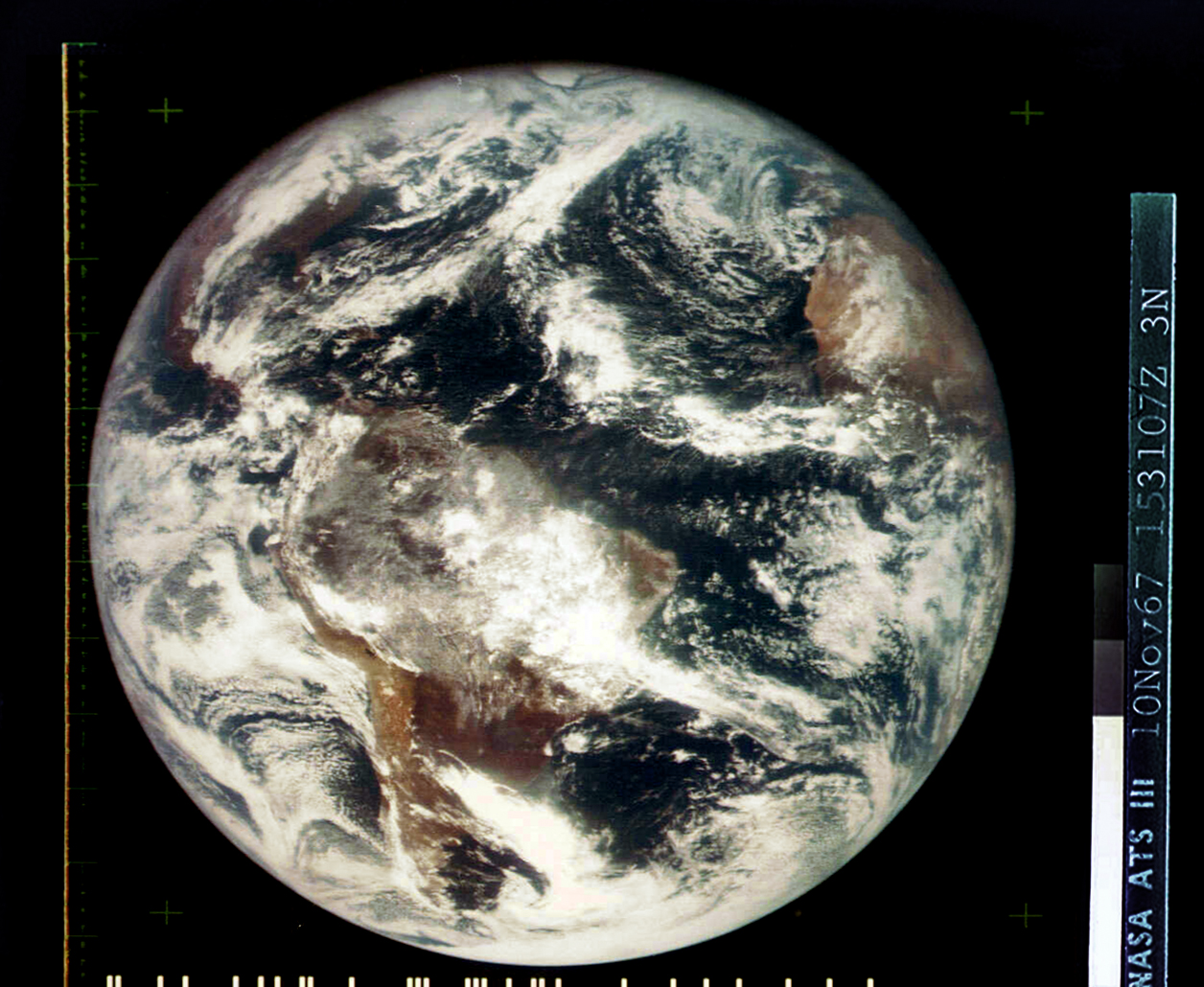
First color photograph of the whole Earth (western Hemisphere), shot from the ATS-3 satellite on 10 November 1967

Utopian novels of the 1960s and 1970s illustrated this interrelationship between psychedelic drugs and ecological values. Aldous Huxley's novel Island (1962) portrayed a utopian society that used psychedelic mushrooms while espousing ecological beliefs. The inhabitants believed that if they treated nature well, nature would treat them well in return; and if they hurt nature, nature would destroy them. The novel, according to Ronald T. Sion, "reflected the mood of the rebellious American youth of the 1960s, particularly in their search for a communal life that promoted ecological principles." Gerd Rohman called Island a "seminal influence on modern ecological thought." More than a decade later, American writer Ernest Callenbach presented a similar story in Ecotopia (1975). In the novel, the members of Ecotopia secede from the United States to create an ecological utopia in the Pacific Northwest. Leslie Paul Thiele notes that in Ecotopia, the society actively uses and cultivates cannabis. "Like Huxley’s islanders", Thiele writes, the members of Ecotopia "facilitate ecological attunement through higher states of consciousness." The notion that cannabis use is related to ecological awareness can be found in the belief systems of groups like the Rastafari movement, who maintain that cannabis use brings them "closer to the earth". In more recent times, the ecologist movement Extinction Rebellion has been allegedly founded after a psychedelic experience.

== See also ==
- Biophilia hypothesis – Idea that humans innately seek connections with the natural world
- Forest bathing – Health practice
- Nature connectedness – Connections between individuals and nature
