= Mind at Large =

Theory of psychedelic experience

Mind at Large is a concept proposed by Aldous Huxley to help interpret psychedelic experience. He maintained that the human mind filters reality under normal circumstances and that psychedelic drugs remove the filter, exposing the user to the Mind at Large.

== Concept ==
Huxley introduced the concept of Mind at Large in his books The Doors of Perception (1954) and Heaven and Hell (1956).

Huxley held that psychedelic drugs open a 'Reducing Valve' in the brain and nervous system that ordinarily inhibits 'Mind at Large' from reaching the conscious mind. In the aforementioned books, Huxley explores the idea that the human mind has evolved to filter wider planes of reality, partly because handling the details of all of the impressions and images coming in would be unbearable and partly because it has been taught to do so. He believes that psychoactive drugs can partly remove this filter, which leaves the drug user exposed to Mind at Large.

During an experiment conducted by the British psychiatrist Humphrey Osmond in 1953, Huxley was administered the psychedelic drug mescaline, and was prompted by Osmond to comment on the various stimuli around him, such as books and flowers. Huxley recorded aspects of their conversation in The Doors of Perception, focusing on what he said in the recordings. He observed that everyday objects lose their functionality, and suddenly exist "as such"; space and dimension become irrelevant, with perceptions seemingly being enlarged, and at times even overwhelming.

In modern psychedelic research, the closest comparator is that of Oceanic Boundlessness. Huxley states:

In the final stage of egolessness there is an 'obscure knowledge' that All is in all—that All is actually each. This is as near, I take it, as a finite mind can ever come to 'perceiving everything that is happening everywhere in the universe.'

In The Doors of Perception, Huxley cites a 1949 paper by Cambridge Philosopher C. D. Broad ('The Relevance of Psychical Research to Philosophy') thus:

Reflecting on my experience, I find myself agreeing with the eminent Cambridge philosopher, Dr. C. D. Broad: ‘that we should do well to consider much more seriously than we have hitherto been inclined to do the type of theory which Bergson put forward in connection with memory and sense-perception. The suggestion is that the function of the brain and nervous system and sense-organs is in the main eliminative and not productive. Each person is at each moment capable of remembering all that has ever happened to him and of perceiving everything that is happening everywhere in the universe. The function of the brain and nervous system is to protect us from being overwhelmed and confused by this mass of largely useless and irrelevant knowledge … leaving only that very small and special selection which is likely to be practically useful.’ According to such a theory, each one of us is potentially Mind at Large. But insofar as we are animals, our business is at all costs to survive. To make biological survival possible, Mind at Large has to be funnelled through the reducing valve of the brain and nervous system. What comes out at the other end is a measly trickle of the kind of consciousness which will help us to stay alive on the surface of this particular planet.

In 2023, a research paper entitled Nested hermeneutics: Mind at Large as a curated trope of psychedelic experience, noted that this passage—as quoted by Huxley—contains two significant omissions and one alteration from Broad's careful summary of Henri Bergson's philosophy on perception and memory. The misquotations weaken the philosophical foundations of Huxley's arguments in The Doors of Perception shifting the emphasis away from Bergson's theory of virtual memory and pure perception as set out in Matter and Memory. Huxley removes the paranormal context of Broad's quotation leaving an impression that Bergson's views (via Broad) apply to psychedelically liberated memory and percepts. The key omission and alteration occur in the line beginning "Each person is at each moment..." In Broad's original paper, this reads: "Each person is at each moment potentially capable of remembering all that has ever happened to him and of perceiving everything that is happening anywhere in the universe." [emphasis added to show changes].

The Doors of Perception beyond its philosophical speculation was a seminal psychedelic work detailing a diary of Huxley's experiences during the day when Osmond visited him in Los Angeles during May 1953 to administer 0.4 g of mescaline. Huxley did not experience what he had hoped for or expected. He puts this down to his aphantasia - an inability to visualize. Of his 'eyes-open' experience, he describes perspective shifts, altered perceptual intensity and changes to his perceived subjectivity. He ascribes more powerful effects indicative of his impression of 'Mind at Large' to 'others' rather than to his own experience in the following passage that repeats his misquotation of Broad's paper:

As Mind at Large seeps past the no longer watertight valve, all kinds of biologically useless things start to happen. In some cases, there may be extra-sensory perceptions. Other persons discover a world of visionary beauty. To others again is revealed the glory, the infinite value and meaningfulness of naked existence, of the given, unconceptualized event. In the final stage of egolessness there is an ‘obscure knowledge’ that All is in all – that All is actually each. This is as near, I take it, as a finite mind can ever come to ‘perceiving everything that is happening everywhere in the universe'. The Doors of Perception, p.6

Huxley makes a total of eight references to 'Mind at Large' in The Doors of Perception. Huxley did not use the term again, or elsewhere, in his published writings. Despite this, the term has gained a significant foothold in psychedelic literature and research. (See: https://iai.tv/articles/the-brain-doesnt-create-consciousness-auid-2002)

The concept of the Mind at Large is also similar to the philosophical concept known as cosmopsychism, which posits that there is a universal consciousness or mind that we are all connected to. The Mind at Large idea is also similar to the ideas proposed by Donald D. Hoffman in his book called, "The Case Against Reality: How evolution hid the truth from our eyes."

== References to the concept ==
In 2009, journalist Andrew Sullivan published excerpts from the writing of Barbara Bradley Hagerty in The Atlantic. In the excerpts, Hagerty connects the research of neuroscientist Andrew Newberg on religious experiences in Catholic nuns and Buddhist monks to Huxley's concept of Mind at Large.

== See also ==
- Altered state of consciousness
- Collective unconscious
- Cosmic consciousness
- Default mode network
- Eight-circuit model of consciousness
- Higher consciousness
- Panpsychism
- Pantheism
