= Josie Kins =

British scientist

- Born: ~1994 (age ~31–32)
- Other names: Josikins; Josikinz; Josikinzz
- Occupations: Psychoactive drug researcher and content creator
- Organization: Mindstate Design Labs
- Notable work: PsychonautWiki, r/Replications, Subjective Effect Index, Disregard Everything I Say, AI-generated psychedelic replications, PsyAI, Dose.Wiki
- Website: josiekins.xyz youtube.com/@josikinz

Josie Kins is a British–American psychoactive drug researcher and content creator.

Kins created the Subjective Effect Index (SEI), a website comprehensively documenting and classifying the effects of hallucinogenic drugs, in 2011. She founded PsychonautWiki, a wiki and encyclopedia covering psychoactive drugs, in 2013. This site is among the largest psychoactive drug encyclopedias on the Internet. However, Kins ceased involvement with PsychonautWiki in 2017.

Kins created the r/Replications subreddit on the social media website Reddit in 2015, in which psychedelic replications are posted and collected. In addition, Kins and collaborators developed an artificial intelligence (AI) model using StyleGAN to create rigorous and highly realistic replications of psychedelic visual effects in 2022, for instance "breakthrough" dimethyltryptamine (DMT) experiences. The model was trained on a dataset of more than 4,000 works of psychedelic art from the Internet. Kins started a YouTube channel in 2022 and periodically posts her team's replications on the channel, with these videos having received popular media attention.

Kins has worked at the American psychedelic pharmaceutical company Mindstate Design Labs studying and documenting the effects of psychedelics since 2021. She has been described as a "psychonaut turned scientific researcher", and has personally tried over 200 different psychedelics, but says that she no longer takes them herself as she has already explored them thoroughly. Kins identifies as a materialist.
