= Mindstate Design Labs =

American pharmaceutical company

- Formerly: Kykeon Biotechnologies
- Type: Private
- Industry: Biotechnology; Pharmaceutical industry; Psychedelic medicine
- Founded: 2021; 5 years ago in San Francisco, United States
- Founder: Dillan DiNardo, Thomas Ray
- Headquarters: San Francisco, California, United States
- Key people: Dillan DiNardo, Thomas Ray, Josie Kins
- Products: MSD-001 (5-MeO-MiPT), undisclosed combinations
- Owner: Dillan DiNardo, Thomas Ray, Ann Shulgin (former co-owner), others
- Website: mindstate.design

Mindstate Design Labs is an American pharmaceutical company which is studying psychedelic drugs and developing combinations of psychedelics and other drugs for potential medical use. The company makes prominent use of artificial intelligence (AI) in their drug development process.

== Company history ==
Mindstate Design Labs is based in San Francisco, California and Pittsburgh, Pennsylvania and was founded in 2021, with its public launch in January 2022. The company was co-founded by Dillan DiNardo, a biotechnology venture capitalist, and Thomas "Tom" Ray, an evolutionary biologist. DiNardo serves as the company's Chief Executive Officer (CEO), while Ray is the company's scientific founder. Beyond his work as an evolutionary biologist, Ray is notable in having published a major study screening the receptor and other target interactions of 35 different serotonergic psychedelics and related psychoactive drugs in 2010. He selected these psychedelics with input from the psychedelic chemist Alexander Shulgin in the 2000s, with Shulgin having discovered and described many of them. Another notable employee is Josie Kins, who works as a psychedelic phenomenologist and AI performance specialist at the company. Mindstate Design Labs is a Silicon Valley-backed Y Combinator tech startup. It raised US$11.5 million during an initial round of funding in early 2022. By June 2025, it had raised over US$24 million.

== Drug candidates ==
Different serotonergic psychedelics have been anecdotally reported to produce widely varying subjective effects, with this thought to be due to differences in their pharmacology. Relatedly, Mindstate Design Labs is attempting to develop multitarget psychedelic combinations that reliably produce specific precision-designed and highly tailored altered states of consciousness, including for use in supervised psychedelic-assisted psychotherapy settings. Their lead drug candidate is MSD-001 (5-MeO-MiPT; "Moxy"), which is a non-selective serotonin receptor agonist and atypical serotonergic psychedelic with relatively mild hallucinogenic effects as well as some MDMA- or entactogen-like effects. The company intends to use this drug as a neutral base component and sort of "psychedelic tofu" for a series of combinations with other psychedelic as well as non-psychedelic drugs to produce different kinds of experiences. They have also referred to this combination strategy as a "primer/probe" approach or method.

As of October 2025, MSD-001 is in phase 1 clinical trials for treatment of mental disorders, with one phase 1 trial having been completed. In the study, MSD-001 produced effects including heightened emotions, associative thinking, enhanced imagination, and mild perceptual effects such as brighter colors, but no hallucinations, self-disintegration, oceanic boundlessness, or other overt hallucinogenic effects typical of conventional psychedelic experiences. A second phase 1 trial will evaluate a combination of MSD-001 with another undisclosed drug. This first combination is aimed to create a psychoactive therapeutic that reduces anxiety, increases insight, and enhances aesthetic appreciation. Mindstate Design Labs has notably patented a variety of therapeutic combinations producing entactogenic altered states of consciousness. The specific medical indications of the company's combination therapeutics have not yet been decided, but potential uses include treatment of anxiety disorders like post-traumatic stress disorder (PTSD) and phobias, mood disorders like depression, and other mental and behavioral health conditions.

5-MeO-MiPT was originally developed by Alexander "Sasha" Shulgin and David Repke and colleagues in 1985. Shulgin was among the most prolific psychedelic chemists and wrote the books PiHKAL (Phenethylamines I Have Known and Loved) and TiHKAL (Tryptamines I Have Known and Loved) documenting the properties and effects of hundreds of psychedelic drugs. Thomas Ray was a personal friend and collaborator of Shulgin. While Shulgin passed away in 2014, his widow and co-author of PiHKAL and TiHKAL, Ann Shulgin, became the third co-owner of Mindstate Design Labs with its founding, remaining in this role until her own death in 2022. One intention of Mindstate Design Labs is to extend Alexander Shulgin's work of studying the effects of different psychedelics, but with novel and more technologically ambitious methods.

== AI platform ==
Many serotonergic psychedelics are highly promiscuous or non-selective in their pharmacology, acting on many different receptors and other targets, with this polypharmacology thought to result in differences in their subjective effects. Mindstate Design Labs has developed an artificial intelligence (AI) platform based on large language models (LLMs) called Osmanthus in order to map the relationships between the target interactions and psychoactive effects of dozens of psychedelics. Other research of this kind has also been done by another group led by Danilo Bzdok at McGill University, with Mindstate Design Labs researchers having subsequently collaborated with this group.

Using the Osmanthus platform, Mindstate Design Labs has processed over 70,000 trip reports from the Internet and scientific literature, representing essentially "every trip report in existence", and developed a catalogue of over 600 distinct psychedelic effects. In addition, they have correlated these effects with target interactions using data from thousands of receptor interaction assays. Initially their pharmacological dataset was the Ray (2010) dataset and had 35 psychedelic drugs assayed across 51 different receptors and other targets, but they have since expanded this to 106 sites along with additional functional assays and biochemical data. The goals of the preceding efforts are to predict the effects in psychedelic experiences based on pharmacology and to engineer new kinds of psychedelic experiences. This in turn is intended to develop better-tolerated, safer, and more predictable psychedelic therapeutics, as well as to help shed light on the workings of consciousness.

MSD-001 (5-MeO-MiPT) is said to have been selected for development using Osmanthus. In addition, the phase 1 clinical trial findings of MSD-001 have been said by the company to be a validation of its AI platform. According to DiNardo, Mindstate Design Labs is the first company to take such an AI-based approach to psychedelic drug development. On the other hand, Mindstate Design Labs's use of AI and trip reports has been regarded as controversial by some in the field, for instance being unconventional and remaining yet-to-be-validated. In addition, Thomas Ray's ideas, which are foundational to Mindstate Design Lab's scientific approach, have been critiqued by Robin Carhart-Harris in the past.

== Legal efforts ==
In January 2022, the United States Drug Enforcement Administration (DEA) proposed making 5-MeO-MiPT and several other unscheduled and relatively obscure psychedelic tryptamines Schedule I controlled substances in the country. This would have created great difficulties in terms of scientific study and potential pharmaceutical development of these drugs for medical use. As a result, the move was prominently opposed by the psychedelic community, including by DiNardo and Mindstate Design Labs, along with a large number of other individuals and organizations. In July 2022, facing significant opposition, the DEA withdrew the proposal to ban the drugs.

== See also ==
- 5-MeO-MiPT (MSD-001) § Research
- Thomas S. Ray and Josie Kins
- List of psychedelic pharmaceutical companies
- List of investigational hallucinogens and entactogens
- Alexander Shulgin Research Institute (ASRI)
- Matthew J. Baggott and Tactogen
- Borax combo
