= Drug culture =

Anthropological relation of people to recreational drugs

Drug culture is a set of social practices, values, norms, and symbols associated with recreational drug use. The history of recreational drug use goes back to prehistory, though drug culture rose to prominence as a term through the psychedelic movement and counterculture of the 1960s.

Drug subcultures are groups of people united by a common understanding of the meaning, value, and risks of the incorporation into one's life of the drug(s) in question. Such unity can take many forms, from friends who take the drug together, possibly obeying certain rules of etiquette, groups banding together to help each other obtain drugs and avoid arrest, to full-scale political movements for the reform of drug laws. The sum of these parts can be considered an individual drug's "culture". They may be focused on a single drug, or endorse polydrug use.

Many artists, writers, and musicians have used various drugs to facilitate or enhance their creativity. Writers have explored their influence on human life in general and particularly on the creative process. There are many writings that portray drug culture. Hunter S. Thompson's 1971 novel Fear and Loathing in Las Vegas employs multiple drug use as a major theme and provides an example of the drug culture of the 1960s.

After various drug cultures came to prominence during the 1960s, 1980s and early 2000s, the internet provided a new location and medium where drug cultures could be born and propagate. Technologies like Tor were able to offer anonymous website hosting and browsing, which were used for the creation of the darknet market SilkRoad, the first of many to be used in the sale of psychoactive substances and other illegal goods. There are YouTube channels devoted to recreational drug use and harm reduction, with the most popular being PsychedSubstance. Except for forums (like Blue Light) where individuals can post and discuss the properties and experiences of psychoactive substances, there are websites and organizations specifically created to serve as encyclopedias of psychoactive drugs and drug culture, such as Erowid and PsychonautWiki.

== By drug ==
=== Cannabis culture ===
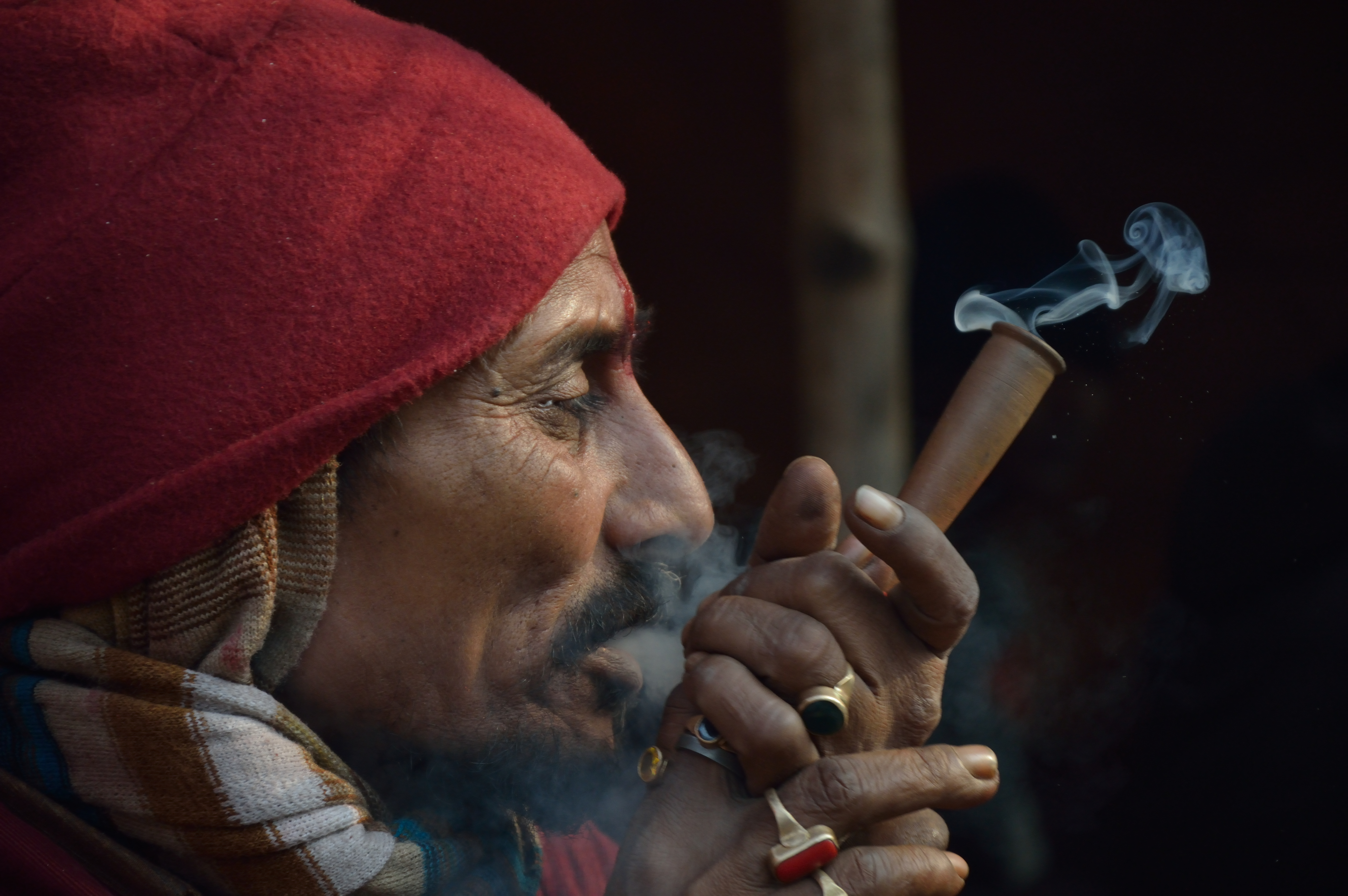
A man smoking cannabis in Kolkata, India.

Cannabis has been used in the ancient past in places such as ancient India, Romania, Egypt, and Mesopotamia. It was often used as medicine or for hemp. Its main route of consumption was smoking. Over time the culture became more international and a general "cannabis culture" formed. Cannabis culture has been responsible for the genre of films known as stoner films which has come to be accepted as a mainstream cinema movement. In the United States the culture has also spawned its own celebrities (such as Tommy Chong and Terence McKenna), magazines (Cannabis Culture and High Times), and, in North America, its own distinct holiday: April 20 (420), which is marked as a day for calling for the legalization of cannabis and celebration of cannabis. The consumption of cannabis influenced many artistic movements such as jazz, electronic music and hip hop.

=== Drinking culture ===
Alcohol (also known as ethanol) is a psychoactive drug found in alcoholic beverages. Alcohol is one of the most commonly abused drugs in the world and is often used for self-medication, and recreational use."

== Hip hop and drugs ==
The hip hop, hardcore rap, and trap scenes, alongside their derivative subgenres and subcultures, are notorious for having continuously celebrated and promoted drug trafficking, gangster lifestyle, and the consumption of alcohol and other drugs since their inception in the United States during the late 1980s–early 1990s.

== Witchcraft and drugs ==
The drugs used in witchcraft are different depending on the culture. Most of the research done on drug use in witchcraft was done in the 60s during the hippie movement. Since then, the claim that ergot was taken in Salem has been disproven. However, because the research was done during the hippie and drug movement in the 70s, the theory is still a part of drug culture.

Ancient Greek love magic used many rituals that show drug use in poisoning to deepen the emotion of love. Love magic would be used by ancient Greek women to gain or keep a man's love. Researchers of this period often look at the agency of the women. Greek love magic relates to drug culture as it deals with poisoning people. There can be similarities found in today's date rape drug. However, in ancient Greek time the women would slowly poison the men. Women would put the poisons on their robes to expose it to the men.

Shamanism used hallucinogens to further their spirituality. These hallucinogens were used for different ceremonies of the Indians in the Northwest Amazon. These ceremonies include funerals and initiation of the young. Shamans had a wider range of use for these drugs. Shamans used these drugs to identify illnesses and find possible cures or to find an enemy.

There is a theory, seemingly disproven due to timeline of events and number of those who experience the symptoms, that the Salem witch trials were caused by ergot poisoning. Ergot poisoning gives a similar effect to LSD, but like ergine the physical effects and dangers (including death due to higher toxicity of the ergolines in ergot) are much more substantial than the use of LSD for psychedelic research and ritual contexts.

== See also ==
- Beatnik
- Drug checking
- Harm reduction
- Entheogens
- Hallucinogens
- Peyote § Cultural significance
- Coffee culture
- Tea culture
- Kava culture
