= Heaven and Hell (essay) =

1956 essay by Aldous Huxley

- First US edition
- Author: Aldous Huxley
- Language: English
- Subject: Philosophy
- Publisher: Chatto & Windus (UK); Harper & Brothers (US)
- Publication date: 1956
- Publication place: United Kingdom
- Media type: Print (Hardback & Paperback)
- Pages: 126

Heaven and Hell is a philosophical essay by Aldous Huxley published in 1956. Huxley derived the title from William Blake's book The Marriage of Heaven and Hell. The essay discusses the relationship between bright, colorful objects, geometric designs, psychoactives, art, and profound experience. Heaven and Hell metaphorically refer to what Huxley conceives to be two contrary mystical experiences that potentially await when one opens the "doors of perception"—not only in a mystical experience, but in prosaic life.

Huxley uses the term antipodes to describe the "regions of the mind" that one can reach via meditation, vitamin deficiencies, self-flagellation, fasting, sleep deprivation, or (most effectively, he says) with the aid of certain chemical substances like LSD or mescaline. Essentially, Huxley defines these "antipodes" of the mind as mental states that one may reach when certain parts of one's brain are disabled (namely the parts associated with filtering information and signals entering the brain) and can then be conscious of certain "regions of the mind" that one would otherwise never be able to pay attention to, due to the lack of biological/utilitarian usefulness. Huxley states that while these states of mind are biologically useless, they are nonetheless spiritually significant, and furthermore, are the singular 'regions' of the mind from which all religions are derived. For example, he says that the Medieval Christians frequently experienced "visions" of Heaven and Hell during the winter, when their diets were severely hampered by lack of critical nutrients in their food supplies (vitamin B, vitamin C)—these people frequently contracted Scurvy and other deficiencies, causing them to hallucinate. He also said that Christians and other religions fast in order to make themselves delirious, thus inducing visions and views of these "antipodes of the mind". Today, Huxley says people can reach these states of mind without harm to their bodies with the aid of certain drugs. Essentially, Huxley says this state of mind allows a person to be conscious of things that would not normally concern him because they have nothing to do with the typical concerns of the world.

In his earlier narrative The Doors of Perception (1954), Huxley recounted in detail his first experience of mescaline.

== Editions ==
- The Doors of Perception and Heaven and Hell, 1954, 1956, Harper & Brothers (US); Chatto & Windus (UK)
  - 1977 Harpercollins (UK), mass market paperback: ISBN 0-586-04437-X
  - 1990 Harper Perennial edition: ISBN 0-06-090007-5
  - 2004 Harper Modern Classics edition: ISBN 0-06-059518-3
  - 2004 Sagebrush library binding: ISBN 1-4176-2859-6
