= Psychedelic replication =

Media recreation of the effects of a hallucinogen

A psychedelic replication is an image, video, or audio recreation of the sensory effects of a hallucinogen. They are most frequently recreations of the perceptual effects of serotonergic psychedelics, for instance LSD, psilocybin, mescaline, or dimethyltryptamine (DMT). However, replications can also be made of the sensory effects of other hallucinogens, such as salvia, deliriants, and dissociatives like ketamine.

Examples of psychedelic visual effects that have been turned into replications include open-eye color enhancement, visual drifting, tracers or after-images, visual geometry like form constants, environmental texturing and patterning, and pareidolia, among many others. Additionally, replications can recreate closed-eye mental imagery or "internal hallucinations" as well as entity encounters of psychedelics.

Replications are created by digital artists, who are sometimes known as "replicators", and posted on the Internet. Some major professional replicators include Symmetric Vision (Raimonds Jermaks) and Loka Vision. Replicators use methods such as image editing, video editing, 3D modeling, and animation to create psychedelic replications. A major community for posting and sharing replications is the r/Replications subreddit on the social media website Reddit. It was founded in 2015 by psychedelic phenomenologist Josie Kins, who also notably coined the term "replication".

In addition to founding r/Replications, Kins and her collaborators subsequently developed an artificial intelligence (AI) model using StyleGAN to create rigorous and realistic replications of psychedelic visual effects in 2022, for instance "breakthrough" DMT experiences including entity encounters. The model was trained on a dataset of more than 4,000 works of psychedelic art from the Internet. Kins started a YouTube channel in 2022 and periodically posts her team's replications on the channel, with these videos having received popular media attention. Other creators have also used AI to make psychedelic replications, for instance artist Sara Phinn Huntley.

Psychedelic replications have additionally been created by scientific researchers for use in virtual reality (VR) environments. One group has studied psychedelic replications in VR for potential therapeutic purposes in treating psychological disorders such as depression. They have named this Psyrreal and described it as a psychedelic-inspired VR experience. It is freely available online and runs on VR headsets such as the HTC Vive Pro Eye. There is also interest in combining psychedelic drugs and VR as part of psychedelic therapy.

== Gallery ==
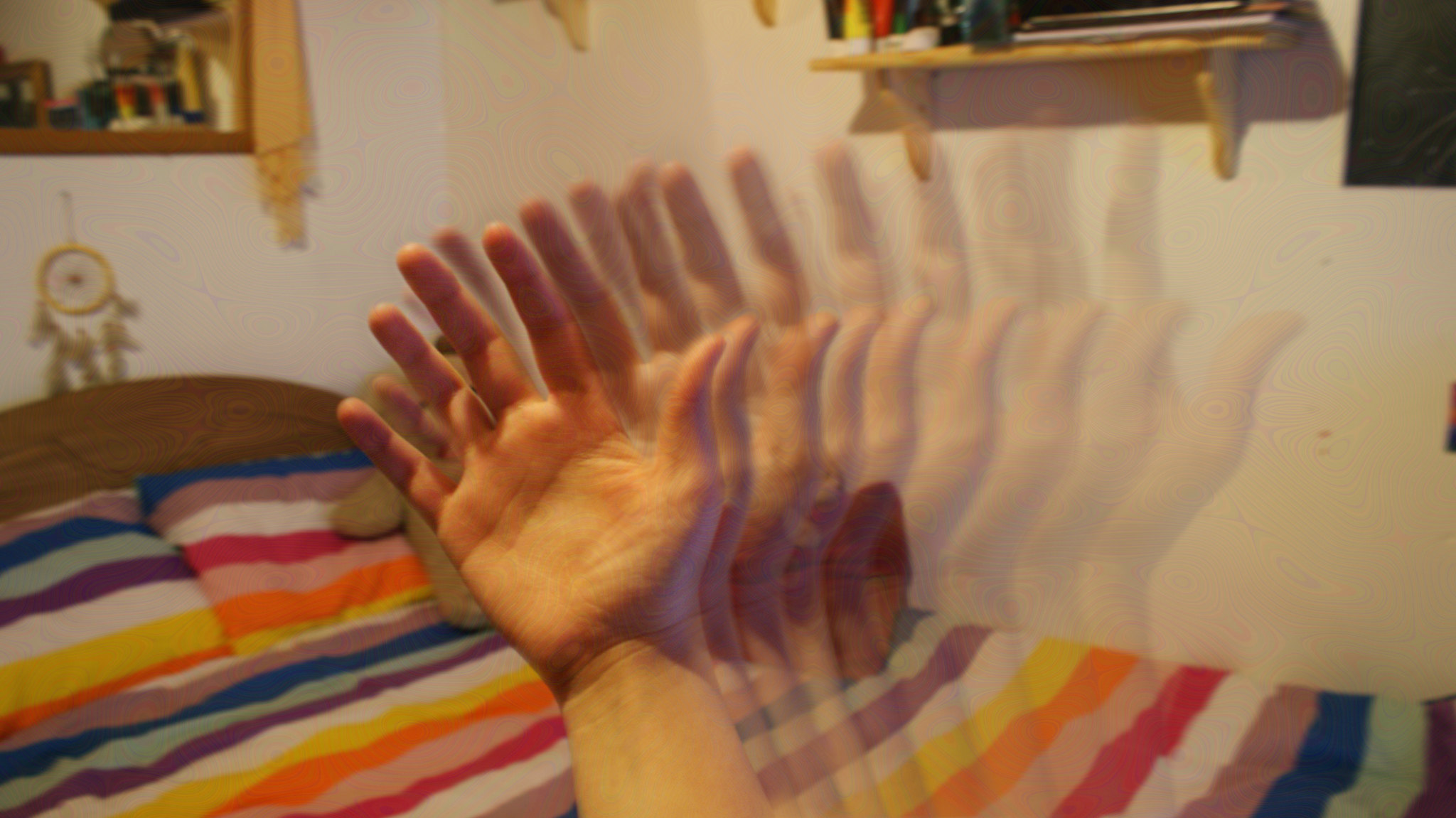
Tracers, showing after-images, by Chelsea Morgan.

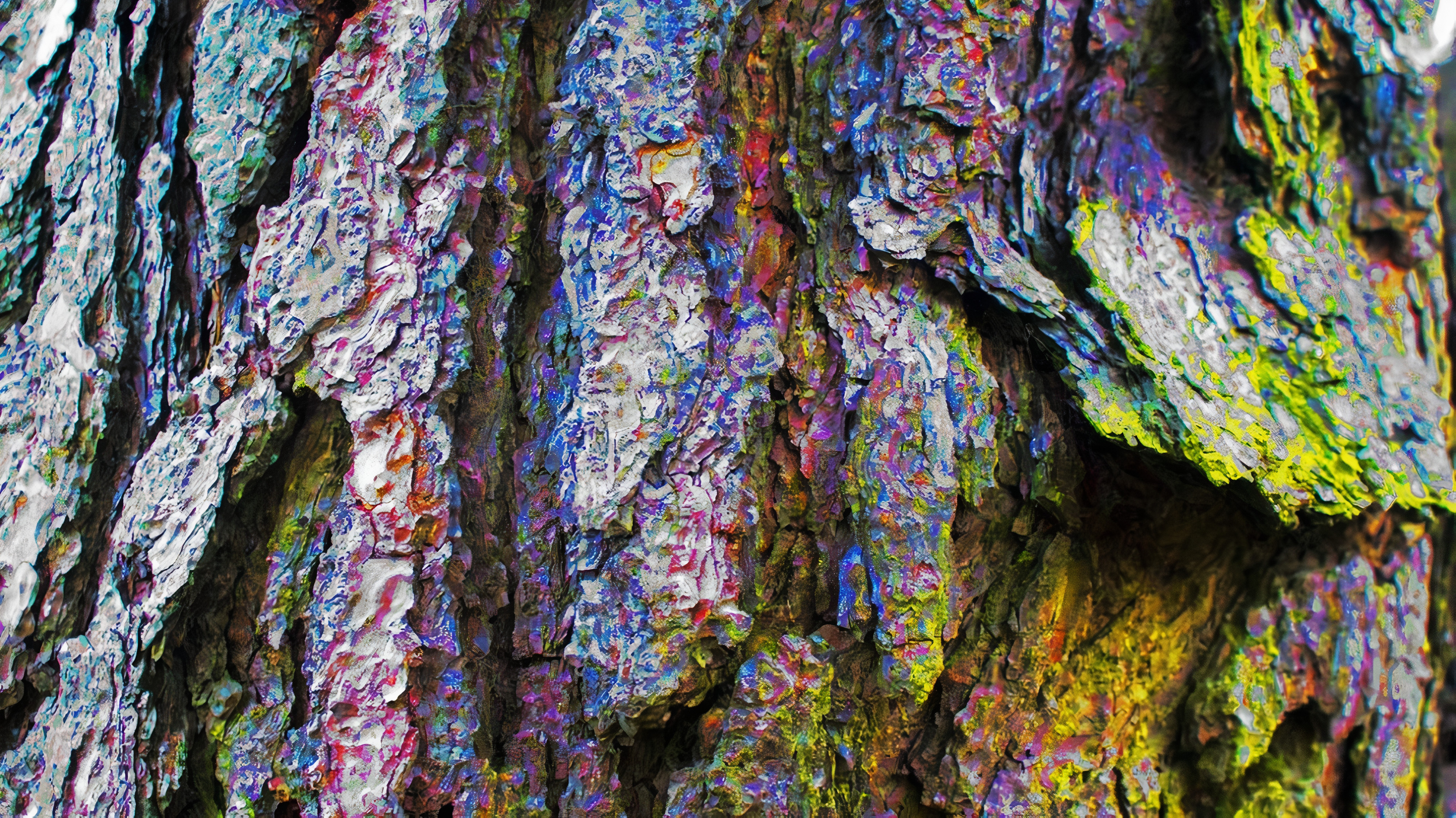
Tree Bark, showing enhanced pattern/texture recognition, by Chelsea Morgan.

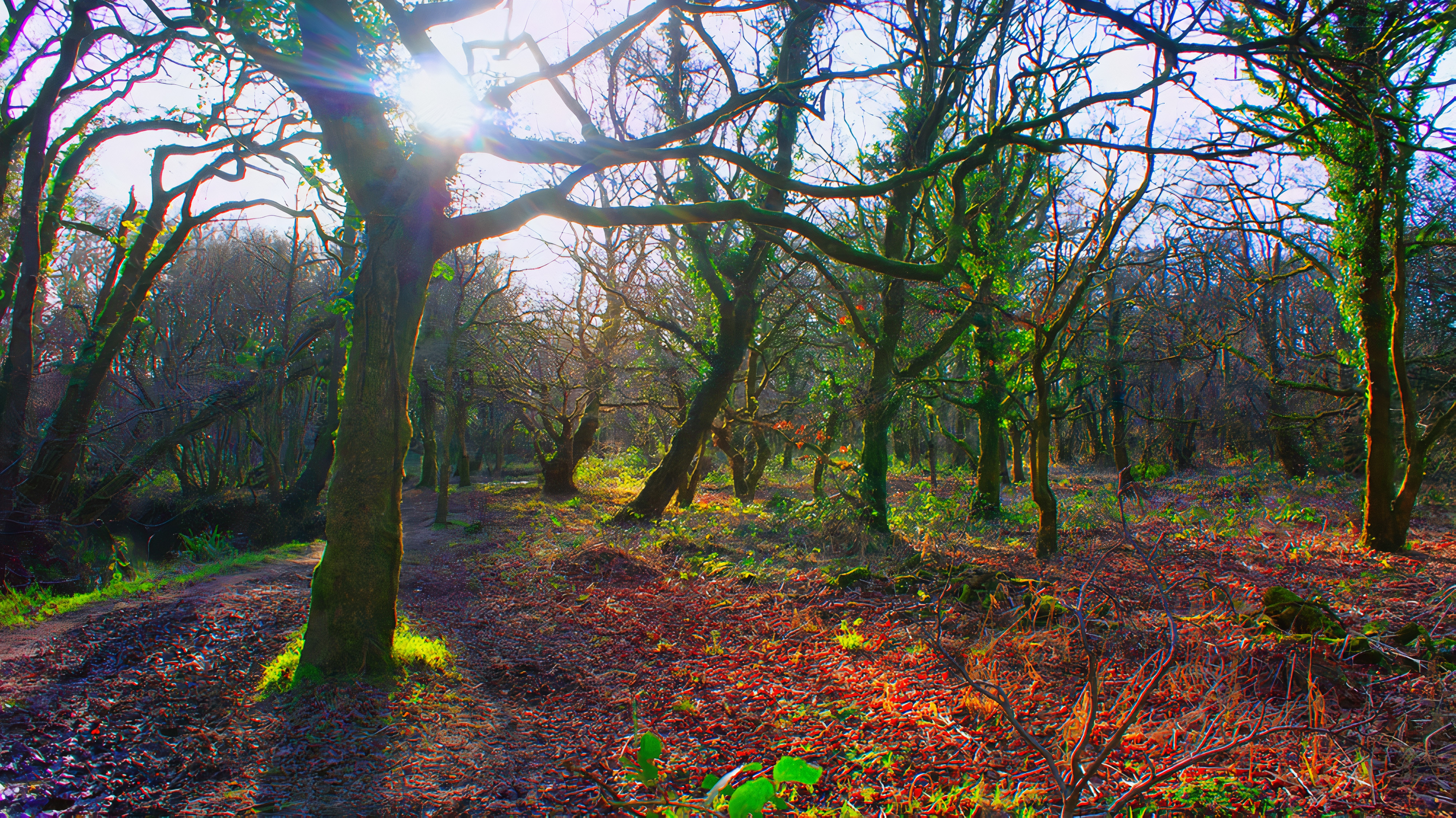
Colourful Welsh Woods, showing color/saturation enhancement, by Chelsea Morgan.

== See also ==
- Psychedelic art
- Psychedelic experience
- Trip report
- Psychonautics
- Subjective Effect Index
- The Psychedelic Experience (1965 film)
