= Psychedelic experience =

Altered state of consciousness

A psychedelic experience, also known colloquially as a "trip", is a temporary altered state of consciousness induced by the consumption of a psychedelic substance. Classic psychedelics include semisynthetic ergolines such as LSD, psilocybin contained in several mushroom species, DMT contained in the ayahuasca brew, and mescaline contained in several cacti.

For example, an acid trip is a psychedelic experience brought on by the use of LSD, while a mushroom trip is a psychedelic experience brought on by the use of psilocybin. Psychedelic experiences feature alterations in normal perception such as visual distortions and a subjective loss of self-identity, sometimes interpreted as mystical experiences. Psychedelic experiences lack predictability, as they can range from being highly pleasurable (known as a good trip) to frightening (known as a bad trip). The outcome of a psychedelic experience is heavily influenced by the person's mood, personality, expectations, and environment (also known as set and setting).

Researchers have interpreted psychedelic experiences in light of a range of scientific theories, including model psychosis theory, filtration theory, psychoanalytic theory, entropic brain theory, integrated information theory, and predictive processing. Psychedelic experiences are also induced and interpreted in religious and spiritual contexts.

Along with psilocybin's unique effect on the state of mind, psilocybin has been subject to the idea of being used for therapeutic treatments. This rapidly developing field of psilocybin-assisted therapy has produced promising results in studies targeting mental disorders like depression, post-traumatic stress disorder (PTSD), and obsessive-compulsive disorder (OCD).

== Etymology ==
The term psychedelic was coined by the psychiatrist Humphrey Osmond during written correspondence with author Aldous Huxley and presented to the New York Academy of Sciences by Osmond in 1957. It is derived from the Greek words ψυχή, psychḗ, 'soul, mind' and δηλείν, dēleín, 'to manifest' thus meaning "mind manifesting," the implication being that psychedelics can develop untapped potentials of the human mind. The term trip was first coined by US Army scientists during the 1950s when they were experimenting with LSD.

== Phenomenology ==
Despite several attempts that have been made, starting in the 19th and 20th centuries, to define common phenomenological structures of the effects produced by classic psychedelics, a universally accepted taxonomy does not yet exist.

=== Visual alteration ===
A prominent element of psychedelic experiences is visual alteration. Psychedelic visual alteration often includes spontaneous formation of complex flowing geometric visual patterning in the visual field. When the eyes are open, the visual alteration is overlaid onto the objects and spaces in the physical environment; when the eyes are closed the visual alteration is seen in the "inner world" behind the eyelids. These visual effects increase in complexity with higher dosages, and also when the eyes are closed. The visual alteration does not normally constitute hallucinations, because the person undergoing the experience can still distinguish between real and imagined visual phenomena, though in some cases, true hallucinations are present. More rarely, psychedelic experiences can include complex hallucinations of objects, animals, people, or even whole landscapes. Visual alterations also include other effects such as afterimages, shifting of color hues, and pareidolia. The appearance of colors and light are usually enhanced.

Psychedelic replications, or reproductions of the visual/perceptual effects of psychedelics, have been created.

=== Mystical experiences ===
A number of studies by Roland R. Griffiths and other researchers have concluded that high doses of psilocybin and other classic psychedelics trigger mystical experiences in most research participants. Mystical experiences have been measured by a number of psychometric scales, including the Hood Mysticism Scale, the Spiritual Transcendence Scale, and the Mystical Experience Questionnaire. The revised version of the Mystical Experience Questionnaire, for example, asks participants about four dimensions of their experience, namely the "mystical" quality, positive mood such as the experience of amazement, the loss of the usual sense of time and space, and the sense that the experience cannot be adequately conveyed through words. The questions on the "mystical" quality in turn probe multiple aspects: the sense of "pure" being, the sense of unity with one's surroundings, the sense that what one experienced was real, and the sense of sacredness. Some researchers have questioned the interpretation of the results from these studies and whether the framework and terminology of mysticism are appropriate in a scientific context, while other researchers have responded to those criticisms and argued that descriptions of mystical experiences are compatible with a scientific worldview.

A group of researchers concluded in a 2011 study that psilocybin "occasions personally and spiritually significant mystical experiences that predict long-term changes in behaviors, attitudes and values".

Some research has found similarities between psychedelic experiences and non-ordinary forms of consciousness experienced in meditation and near-death experiences. The phenomenon of ego dissolution is often described as a key feature of the psychedelic experience.

Individuals who have psychedelic experiences often describe what they experienced as "more real" than ordinary experience. For example, the psychologist Benny Shanon, after observing ayahuasca trips, referred to "the assessment, very common with ayahuasca, that what is seen and thought during the course of intoxication defines the real, whereas the world that is ordinarily perceived is actually an illusion." Similarly, the psychiatrist Stanislav Grof described the LSD experience as "complex revelatory insights into the nature of existence… typically accompanied by a sense of certainty that this knowledge is ultimately more relevant and 'real' than the perceptions and beliefs we share in everyday life."

=== Bad trips ===
A "bad trip" is a highly unpleasant psychedelic experience. A bad trip on psilocybin, for instance, often features intense anxiety, confusion, agitation, or even psychotic episodes. Bad trips can be connected to the anxious ego-dissolution (AED) dimension of the APZ questionnaire used in research on psychedelic experiences. As of 2011, exact data on the frequency of bad trips are not available. Some research suggests that the risk of a bad trip on psilocybin is higher when multiple drugs are used, when the user has a history of certain mental illnesses, and when the user is not supervised by a sober person.

In clinical research settings, precautions including the screening and preparation of participants, the training of the session monitors who will be present during the experience, and the selection of appropriate physical setting can minimize the likelihood of psychological distress. Researchers have suggested that the presence of professional "trip sitters" (i.e., session monitors) may significantly reduce the negative experiences associated with a bad trip. In most cases in which anxiety arises during a supervised psychedelic experience, reassurance from the session monitor is adequate to resolve it; however, if distress becomes intense it can be treated pharmacologically, for example with the benzodiazepine diazepam.

Research shows that preparing for the psychedelic experience, as well as the set and setting of the individual and environment they will be in, can help mitigate "bad trips''. Harvard Psychologist Timothy Leary has said that "set" and "setting" are important to the experience. Set refers to the participants' internal state – their mental, emotional and physical state, as well as their intentions for the experience (whether they want to solve a complex problem, discover the underlying secrets of the universe, or heal from a past trauma) – the better these preliminary conditions, the better the experience usually goes. Setting refers to the environment the experience will take place in. Leary and others have found that, due to the highly suggestible nature of the psychedelic experience, the environment the participant is in plays a critical role. For example, a warmly decorated room with a comfortable couch, nice music and an overall welcoming atmosphere will have a much more positive effect than a cold stainless steel and concrete reinforced hospital room. Taking these necessary precautions before a psychedelic experience, along with the presence of trained professionals, have been shown to significantly reduce an overall negative experience.

The psychiatrist Stanislav Grof wrote that unpleasant psychedelic experiences are not necessarily unhealthy or undesirable, arguing that they may have potential for psychological healing and lead to breakthrough and resolution of unresolved psychic issues. Drawing on narrative theory, the authors of a 2021 study of 50 users of psychedelics found that many described bad trips as having been sources of insight or even turning points in life.

== Scientific models ==
Link R. Swanson divides scientific frameworks for understanding psychedelic experiences into two waves. In the first wave, encompassing nineteenth- and twentieth-century frameworks, he includes model psychosis theory (the psychotomimetic paradigm), filtration theory, and psychoanalytic theory. In the second wave of theories, encompassing twenty-first-century frameworks, Swanson includes entropic brain theory, integrated information theory, and predictive processing.

=== Model psychosis theory ===
Researchers studying mescaline in the early twentieth century and LSD in the mid-twentieth century took interest in these drugs as producing a temporary "model psychosis" that could assist researchers and medical students in understanding the experiences of patients with schizophrenia and other psychotic disorders.

It was popular to compare between experiences of psychedelics and psychosis in the mid-20th century. The scales used in psychosis and psychedelic research, in the late-20th and 21st century, are more different. Despite the many similarities that were observed between experiences of psychedelics and psychosis in the past, contemporary psychosis and psychedelic research highlight some features more than others (since they have different goals and assumptions), such as mysticism, connectedness, awe, peace, ego dissolution, hallucinations, suspiciousness, disorganization, hostility, grandiosity, and withdrawal.

=== Filtration theory ===
Aldous Huxley and Humphrey Osmond applied the pre-existing ideas of filtration theory, which held that the brain filters what enters into consciousness, to explain psychedelic experiences (and it is from this paradigm that the term psychedelic is derived). Huxley believed that the brain was filtering reality itself and that psychedelics granted conscious access to "Mind at Large," whereas Osmond believed that the brain was filtering aspects of the mind out of consciousness. Swanson writes that Osmond's view seems "less radical, more compatible with materialist science, and less epistemically and ontologically committed" than Huxley's.

=== Psychoanalytic theory ===
Psychoanalytic theory was the predominant interpretive framework in mid-twentieth-century psychedelic-assisted psychotherapy. For instance, Czech psychiatrist Stanislav Grof characterised psychedelic experiencing as "non-specific amplification of unconscious mental processes", and he analysed the phenomenology of the LSD experience (particularly the experience of what he termed psychospiritual death and rebirth) in terms of Otto Rank's theory of the unresolved memory of the primal birth trauma.

=== Entropic brain theory ===
Entropic brain theory is a theory of consciousness proposed in 2014 by neuroscientist Robin Carhart-Harris and colleagues that was inspired by research on psychedelic drugs. The theory suggests that the entropy of brain activity within certain limits indexes the richness of conscious states, particularly under the influence of psychedelics. This theory posits that elevated brain entropy correlates with heightened informational richness, suggesting that psychedelics increase brain criticality, making it more sensitive to internal and external perturbations. This enhanced state of brain activity is proposed to influence susceptibility to environmental factors ("set" and "setting") and potentially offer new insights for treating psychiatric and neurological disorders, including depression and disorders of consciousness.

=== Integrated information theory ===
Integrated information theory is a theory of consciousness proposing to explain all forms of consciousness, and has been applied specifically to psychedelic experiences by Andrew Gallimore.

=== Predictive processing ===
Sarit Pink-Hashkes and colleagues have applied the predictive processing paradigm in neuroscience to psychedelic experiences in order to formalize the idea of the entropic brain.

=== Default mode network modulation ===
A 2022 review suggests that psychedelics modulate the default mode network, disrupting connectivity and increasing connectivity between networks.

== In religious and spiritual contexts ==
Alan Watts likened psychedelic experiencing to the transformations of consciousness that are undertaken in Taoism and Zen, which he says is, "more like the correction of faulty perception or the curing of a disease… not an acquisitive process of learning more and more facts or greater and greater skills, but rather an unlearning of wrong habits and opinions." Watts further described the LSD experience as, "revelations of the secret workings of the brain, of the associative and patterning processes, the ordering systems which carry out all our sensing and thinking."

According to Luis Luna, psychedelic experiences have a distinctly gnosis-like quality; it is a learning experience that elevates consciousness and makes a profound contribution to personal development. For this reason, the plant sources of some psychedelic drugs such as ayahuasca and mescaline-containing cacti are sometimes referred to as "plant teachers" by those using those drugs.

Furthermore, psychedelic drugs have a history of religious use across the world that extends back for hundreds or perhaps thousands of years. They are often called entheogens because of the kinds of experiences they can induce, however various entheogens happen to also be hypnotics (muscimol mushrooms), deliriants (jimsonweed) or atypical/quasi-psychedelics like cannabis. Some small contemporary religious movements base their religious activities and beliefs around psychedelic experiences, such as Santo Daime and the Native American Church.

== Psilocybin-assisted therapy ==
=== Depression ===
Studies on psilocybin-assisted therapy have found participants experience reduced depressive symptoms afterwards, as well as reduced anxiety symptoms. Studies have also found that reductions in symptoms continued long afterwards, suggesting psilocybin could potentially be effective as a long-term treatment.

=== Post-traumatic stress disorder ===
Individuals who suffer from post-traumatic stress disorder (PTSD) may also benefit from psilocybin-assisted therapy. Based on studies so far, MDMA-assisted therapy appears to be effective for reducing symptoms of PTSD, leading a group of researchers to argue that psilocybin-assisted therapy may also be effective in PTSD and call for a study on the topic.

=== Obsessive-compulsive disorder ===
In a study that reviewed a variety of drugs to determine if it had an impact on symptoms of OCD, psilocybin was also tested and determined effective in reducing symptoms. This reduction in symptoms applied to all individuals who participated in the study, proving psilocybin to be very reliable along with efficiency in reducing OCD symptoms.

== See also ==
- Cannabis and time perception
- Eight-circuit model of consciousness
- List of hallucinogen scales
- List of psychedelic literature
- Mindstate Design Labs
- Numinous experience
- Philosophy of psychedelics
- Psychedelic microdosing
- Psychedelic syndrome
- Psychonautics
- Subjective Effect Index
- Trip killer
- Trip report
