= The Doors of Perception =

1954 book by Aldous Huxley

- First edition, published in 1954
- Author: Aldous Huxley
- Language: English
- Subject: Philosophy; psychology
- Published: 1954 Chatto & Windus (UK); Harper & Row (US)
- Publication place: United Kingdom
- Media type: Print (hardback & paperback)
- Pages: 63 (hardcover, first edition; without the accompanying 1956 essay Heaven and Hell)
- ISBN: 0-06-059518-3
- OCLC: 54372147
- Dewey Decimal: 615/.7883 22
- LC Class: RM666.P48 H9 2004

The Doors of Perception is an autobiographical book written by Aldous Huxley. Published in 1954, it elaborates on his psychedelic experience under the influence of mescaline in May 1953. Huxley recalls the insights he experienced, ranging from the "purely aesthetic" to "sacramental vision", and reflects on their philosophical and psychological implications. In 1956, he published Heaven and Hell, another essay which elaborates these reflections further. The two works have since often been published together as one book; the titles of both come from William Blake's 1793 book The Marriage of Heaven and Hell.

The Doors of Perception provoked strong reactions for its evaluation of psychedelic drugs as facilitators of mystical insight with great potential benefits for science, art, and religion. While many found the argument compelling, others including German writer Thomas Mann, Vedantic monk Swami Prabhavananda, Jewish philosopher Martin Buber, and Orientalist scholar Robert Charles Zaehner countered that the effects of mescaline are subjective and should not be conflated with objective religious mysticism. Huxley himself continued to take psychedelics for the rest of his life, and the alleged understanding he gained from them influenced his final novel Island, published in 1962.

== Background ==
=== William Blake ===
William Blake (1757–1827), who inspired the book's title and writing style, was an influential English artist most notable for his paintings and poetry. The "doors of perception" was originally a metaphor written by Blake in his 1790 book, The Marriage of Heaven and Hell. The metaphor was used to represent Blake's feelings about mankind's limited perception of the reality around them:

If the doors of perception were cleansed every thing would appear to man as it is, Infinite. For man has closed himself up, till he sees all things thro' narrow chinks of his cavern.

=== Mescaline ===
Mescaline is the principal active psychedelic agent of the peyote cactus, which has been used in Native American religious ceremonies for thousands of years. A German pharmacologist, Arthur Heffter, isolated the alkaloids in the peyote cactus in 1897. These included mescaline, which he showed through a combination of animal and self-experiments was the compound responsible for the psychoactive properties of the plant. In 1919, Ernst Späth, an Austrian chemist, synthesised the drug. Although personal accounts of taking the cactus had been written by psychologists such as Weir Mitchell in the US and Havelock Ellis in the UK during the 1890s, the German-American Heinrich Klüver was the first to systematically study its psychological effects in a small book called Mescal: The 'Divine' Plant and Its Psychological Effects published in 1928. The book stated that the drug could be used to research the unconscious mind.

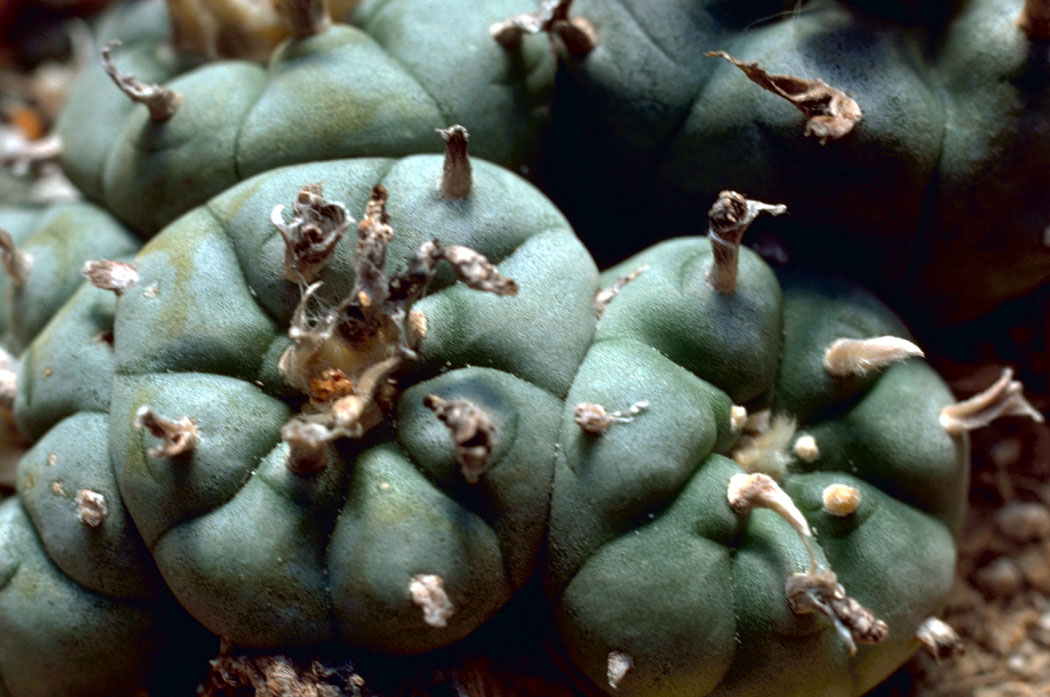
A peyote cactus, from which mescaline is derived.

In the 1930s, American anthropologist Weston La Barre published The Peyote Cult, the first study of the ritual use of peyote as an entheogen drug amongst the Huichol people of western Mexico. La Barre noted that the Native American users of the cactus took it to obtain visions for prophecy, healing and inner strength. Most psychiatric research projects into the drug in the 1930s and early 1940s tended to look at the role of the drug in mimicking psychosis. In 1947 however, the US Navy undertook Project Chatter, which examined the potential for the drug as a truth revealing agent. In the early 1950s, when Huxley wrote his book, mescaline was still regarded as a research chemical rather than a drug and was listed in the Parke-Davis catalogue with no controls. Mescaline also played a paramount part in influencing the beat generation of poets and writers of the later 1940s to the early 1960s. Most notable in this regard were William S. Burroughs, Jack Kerouac, and Allen Ginsberg, all of whom were respected contemporary beat artists of their generation. Theirs and many other contemporary artists' works were heavily influenced by over-the-counter forms of mescaline during this time, due to its potency and attainability.

Huxley had been interested in spiritual matters and had used alternative therapies for some time. In 1936 he told TS Eliot that he was starting to meditate, and he used other therapies too; the Alexander Technique and the Bates method of seeing had particular importance in guiding him through personal crises. In the late 1930s he had become interested in the spiritual teaching of Vedanta and in 1945 he published The Perennial Philosophy, which set out a philosophy that he believed was found amongst mystics of all religions. He had known for some time of visionary experience achieved by taking drugs in certain religions.

=== Research by Humphry Osmond ===
Huxley had first heard of peyote use in ceremonies of the Native American Church in New Mexico, soon after coming to the United States in 1937. He first became aware of the cactus's active ingredient, mescaline, after reading an academic paper written by Humphry Osmond, a British psychiatrist working at Weyburn Mental Hospital, Saskatchewan, in early 1952. Osmond's paper set out results from his research into schizophrenia, using mescaline that he had been undertaking with colleagues, doctors Abram Hoffer and John Smythies. In the epilogue to his novel The Devils of Loudun, published earlier that year, Huxley had written that drugs were "toxic short cuts to self-transcendence". For the Canadian writer George Woodcock, Huxley had changed his opinion because mescaline was not addictive and appeared to be without unpleasant physical or mental side-effects. Further, he had found that hypnosis, autohypnosis and meditation had apparently failed to produce the results he wanted.

== Huxley's experience with mescaline ==
After reading Osmond's paper, Huxley sent him a letter on Thursday, 10 April 1952, expressing interest in the research and putting himself forward as an experimental subject. His letter explained his motivations as being rooted in an idea that the brain is a reducing valve that restricts consciousness, and hoping mescaline might help access a greater degree of awareness (an idea he later included in the book). Reflecting on his stated motivations, Woodcock wrote that Huxley had realised that the ways to enlightenment were many, including prayer and meditation. He hoped drugs might also break down the barriers of the ego, and both draw him closer to spiritual enlightenment and satisfy his quest as a seeker of knowledge.

In a second letter on Saturday, 19 April, Huxley invited Osmond to stay while he was visiting Los Angeles to attend the American Psychiatric Association convention. He also wrote that he looked forward to the mescaline experience and reassured Osmond that his doctor did not object to his taking it. Huxley had invited his friend, the writer Gerald Heard, to participate in the experiment; although Heard was too busy this time, he did join him for a session in November of that year.

=== Day of the experiment ===
Osmond arrived at Huxley's house in West Hollywood on Sunday, 3 May 1953, and recorded his impressions of the famous author as a tolerant and kind man, although he had expected otherwise. The psychiatrist had misgivings about giving the drug to Huxley, and wrote, "I did not relish the possibility, however remote, of being the man who drove Aldous Huxley mad," but instead found him an ideal subject. Huxley was "shrewd, matter-of-fact and to the point" and his wife Maria "eminently sensible". Overall, they all liked each other, which was very important when administering the drug. The mescaline was slow to take effect, but Osmond saw that after two and a half hours the drug was working and after three hours Huxley was responding well. The experience lasted eight hours and both Osmond and Maria remained with him throughout.

The experience started in Huxley's study before the party made a seven block trip to The Owl Drug (Rexall) store, known as World's Biggest Drugstore, at the corner of Beverly and La Cienega Boulevards. Huxley was particularly fond of the shop and the large variety of products available there (in stark contrast to the much smaller selection in English chemist's shops). There he considered a variety of paintings in art books. For one of his friends, Huxley's poor eyesight manifested in both a great desire to see and a strong interest in painting, which influenced the strong visual and artistic nature of his experience.

After returning home to listen to music, eat, and walk in the garden, a friend drove the threesome to the hills overlooking the city. Photographs show Huxley standing, alternately arms on hips and outstretched with a grin on his face. Finally, they returned home and to ordinary consciousness. One of Huxley's friends who met him on the day said that despite writing about wearing flannel trousers, he was actually wearing blue jeans. Huxley admitted to having changed the fabric as Maria thought he should be better dressed for his readers. Osmond later said he had a photo of the day that showed Huxley wearing flannels.

=== Compilation of the book ===
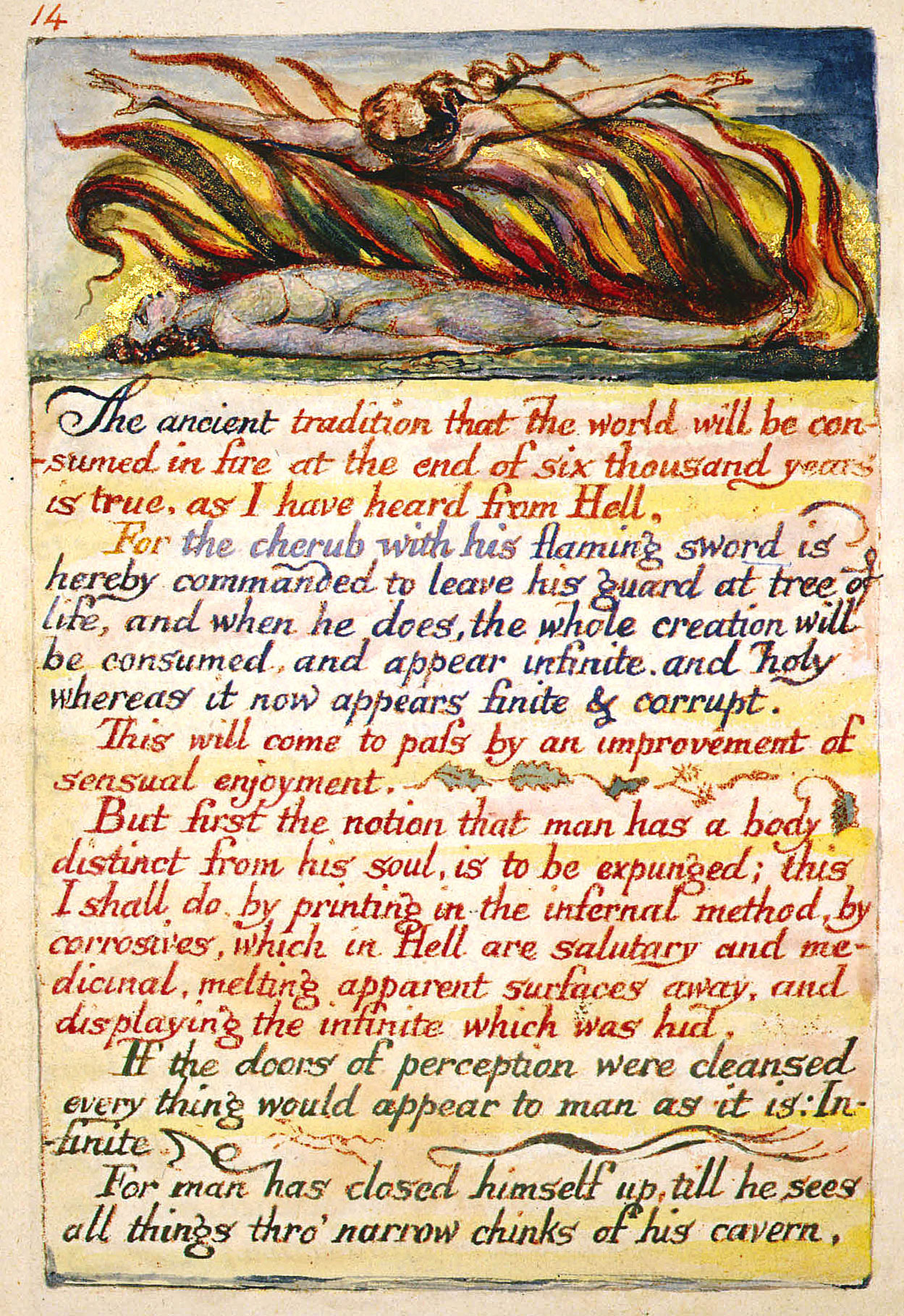
One of the copies of William Blake's unique hand painted editions, created for the original printing of the poem. The line from which Huxley draws the title is in the second to last stanza. This image represents Copy H, Plate 14 of The Marriage of Heaven and Hell which is currently held at The Fitzwilliam Museum.

After Osmond's departure, Huxley and Maria left to go on a three-week, 5,000-mile (8,000-kilometre) car trip around the national parks of the North West of the US. After returning to Los Angeles, he took a month to write the book. The Doors of Perception was the first book Huxley dedicated to his wife Maria. Harold Raymond, at his publisher Chatto and Windus, said of the manuscript, "You are the most articulate guinea pig that any scientist could hope to engage." The title was taken from William Blake's poem The Marriage of Heaven and Hell:

If the doors of perception were cleansed every thing would appear to man as it is: Infinite. For man has closed himself up, till he sees all things thro' narrow chinks of his cavern.

Huxley had used Blake's metaphor in The Doors of Perception while discussing the paintings of Vermeer and the Nain brothers, and previously in The Perennial Philosophy, once in relation to the use of mortification as a means to remove persistent spiritual myopia and secondly to refer to the absence of separation in spiritual vision. Blake had a resounding impact on Huxley, who shared many of Blake's earlier revelations and interests in art and literature. In the early 1950s, Huxley had suffered a debilitating attack of the eye condition iritis. This increased his concern for his already poor eyesight and much of his work in the early part of the decade had featured metaphors of vision and sight.

== Synopsis ==
After a brief overview of research into mescaline, Huxley recounts that he was given 4/10 of a gram at 11:00 am one day in May 1953. Huxley writes that he hoped to gain insight into extraordinary states of mind and expected to see brightly coloured visionary landscapes. When he only sees lights and shapes, he puts this down to being a bad visualiser; however, he experiences a great change in his perception of the external world.

By 12:30 pm, a vase of flowers becomes the "miracle, moment by moment, of naked existence". The experience, he asserts, is neither agreeable nor disagreeable, but simply "is". He likens it to Meister Eckhart's "istigkeit" or "is-ness", and Plato's "Being" but not separated from "Becoming". He feels he understands the Hindu concept of Satchitananda, as well as the Zen koan that, "the dharma body of the Buddha is in the hedge" and Buddhist suchness. In this state, Huxley explains that he did not have an "I", but instead a "not-I". Meaning and existence, pattern and colour become more significant than spatial relationships and time. Duration is replaced by a perpetual present.

Reflecting on the experience afterwards, Huxley finds himself in agreement with philosopher C. D. Broad that to enable us to live, the brain and nervous system eliminate unessential information from the totality of the 'Mind at Large'. (It was however noted in a 2023 paper that Huxley's citation of a passage from C. D. Broad's 1949 paper "The Relevance of Psychical Research to Philosophy" omitted two words and changed one other, thus altering the sense and accuracy of Broad's reference to the philosophy of time and memory proposed by philosopher Henri Bergson.)

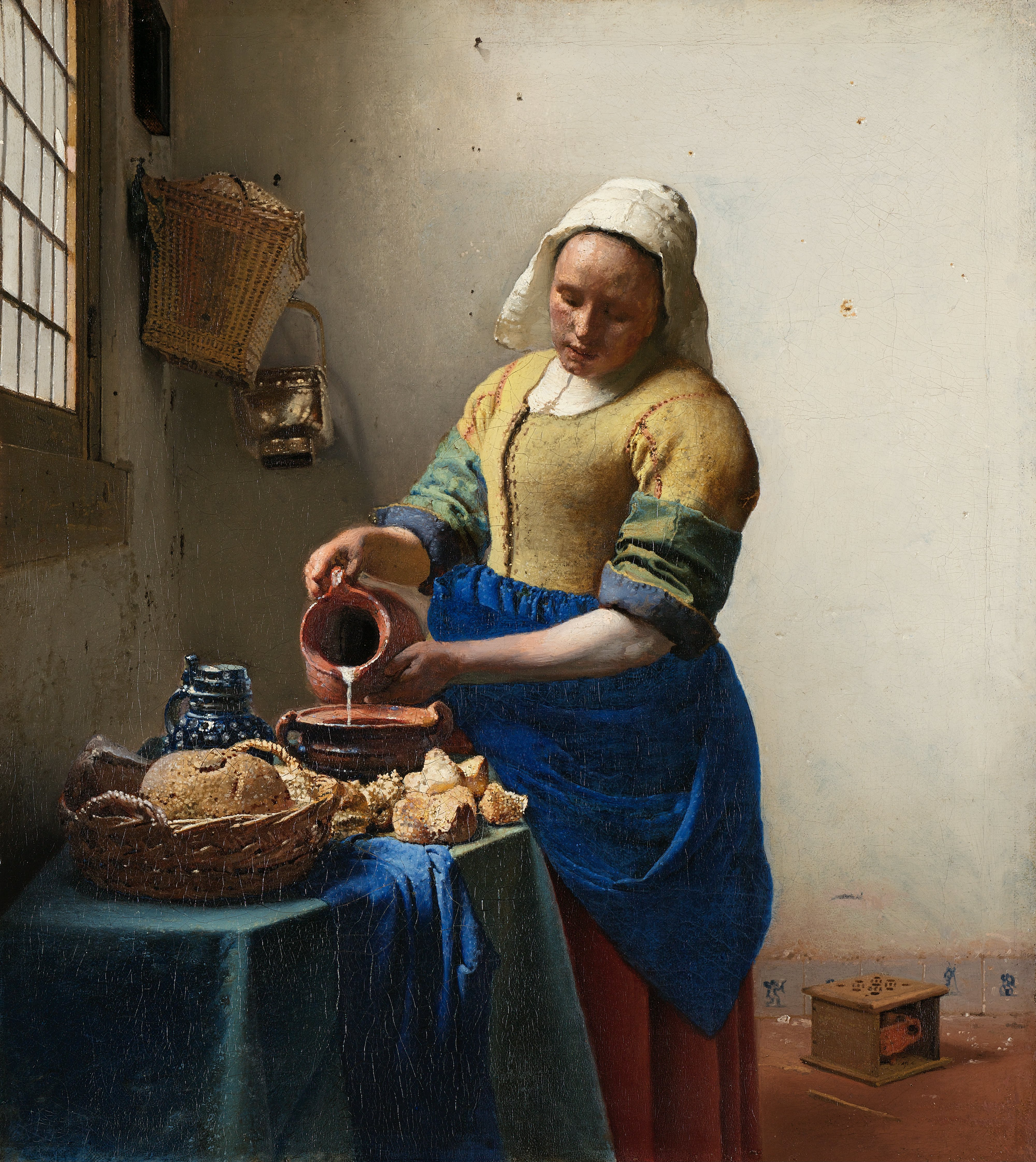
The Milkmaid by Johannes Vermeer. "That mysterious artist was truly gifted with the vision that perceives the Dharma-Body as the hedge at the bottom of the garden", reflected Huxley.

In summary, Huxley writes that the ability to think straight is not reduced while under the influence of mescaline, visual impressions are intensified, and the human experimenter will see no reason for action because the experience is so fascinating.

Temporarily leaving the chronological flow, he mentions that four or five hours into the experience he was taken to the World's Biggest Drug Store (WBDS), where he was presented with books on art. In one book, the dress in Botticelli's Judith provokes a reflection on drapery as a major artistic theme as it allows painters to include the abstract in representational art, to create mood, and also to represent the mystery of pure being. Huxley feels that human affairs are somewhat irrelevant whilst on mescaline and attempts to shed light on this by reflecting on paintings featuring people. Cézanne's Self-portrait with a straw hat seems incredibly pretentious, while Vermeer's human still lifes (also, the Le Nain brothers and Vuillard) are the nearest to reflecting this not-self state.

For Huxley, the reconciliation of these cleansed perceptions with humanity reflects the age old debate between active and contemplative life, known as the way of Martha and the way of Mary. As Huxley believes that contemplation should also include action and charity, he concludes that the experience represents contemplation at its height, but not its fullness. Correct behaviour and alertness are needed. Nonetheless, Huxley maintains that even quietistic contemplation has an ethical value, because it is concerned with negative virtues and acts to channel the transcendent into the world.

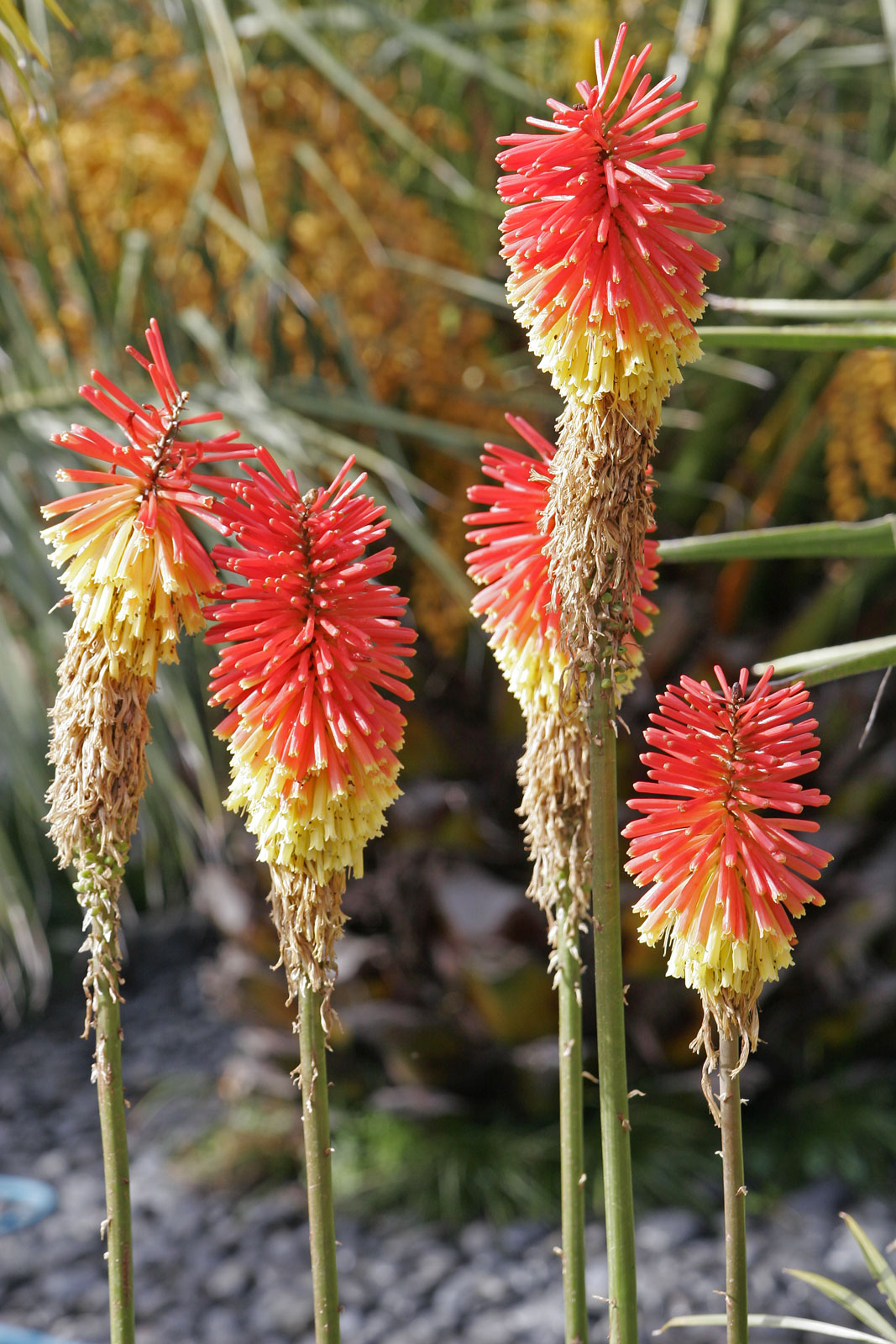
The Red Hot Poker flowers in Huxley's garden were "so passionately alive that they seemed to be standing on the very brink of utterance".

After listening to Mozart's C-Minor Piano Concerto, Gesualdo's madrigals and Alban Berg's Lyric Suite, Huxley heads into the garden. Outside, the garden chairs take on such an immense intensity that he fears being overwhelmed; this gives him an insight into madness. He reflects that spiritual literature, including the works of Jakob Böhme, William Law and the Tibetan Book of the Dead, talks of these pains and terrors. Huxley speculates that schizophrenia is the inability to escape from this reality into the world of common sense and thus help would be essential.

After lunch and the drive to the WBDS he returns home and to his ordinary state of mind. His final insight is taken from Buddhist scripture: that within sameness there is difference, although that difference is not different from sameness.

The book finishes with Huxley's final reflections on the meaning of his experience. Firstly, the urge to transcend one's self is universal through times and cultures (and was characterised by H. G. Wells as The Door in the Wall). He reasons that better, healthier "doors" are needed than alcohol and tobacco. Mescaline has the advantage of not provoking violence in takers, but its effects last an inconveniently long time and some users can have negative reactions. Ideally, self-transcendence would be found in religion, but Huxley feels that it is unlikely that this will ever happen. Christianity and mescaline seem well-suited for each other; the Native American Church for instance uses the drug as a sacrament, where its use combines religious feeling with decorum.

Huxley concludes that mescaline is neither divine illumination nor beatific vision, but a "gratuitous grace" (a term taken from Thomas Aquinas' Summa Theologica). It is not necessary but helpful, especially so for the intellectual, who can become the victim of words and symbols. Although systematic reasoning is important, direct perception has intrinsic value too. Finally, Huxley maintains that the person who has this experience will be transformed for the better.

== Reception ==
The book met with a variety of responses, both positive and negative, from writers in the fields of literature, psychiatry, philosophy and religion. These included a symposium published in The Saturday Review magazine with the unlikely title of, Mescalin – An Answer to Cigarettes, including contributions from Huxley; J.S. Slotkin, a professor of anthropology; and a physician, Dr. W.C. Cutting.

=== Literature ===
For the Scottish poet Edwin Muir, "Mr. Huxley's experiment is extraordinary, and is beautifully described". Thomas Mann, the author and friend of Huxley, believed the book demonstrated Huxley's escapism. He thought that while escapism found in mysticism might be honourable, drugs were not. Huxley's 'aesthetic self-indulgence' and indifference to humanity would lead to suffering or stupidity; Mann concluded the book was irresponsible, if not quite immoral, to encourage young people to try the drug mescaline.

For Huxley's biographer and friend, the author Sybille Bedford, the book combined sincerity with simplicity, passion with detachment. "It reflects the heart and mind open to meet the given, ready, even longing, to accept the wonderful. The Doors is a quiet book. It is also one that postulates a goodwill – the choice once more of the nobler hypothesis. It turned out, for certain temperaments, a seductive book". For biographer David King Dunaway, The Doors of Perception, along with The Art of Seeing, can be seen as the closest Huxley ever came to autobiographical writing.

=== Psychiatry ===
William Sargant, the controversial British psychiatrist, reviewed the book for The British Medical Journal and particularly focused on Huxley's reflections on schizophrenia. He wrote that the book brought to life the mental suffering of schizophrenics, which should make psychiatrists uneasy about their failure to relieve this. Also, he hoped that the book would encourage the investigation of the physiological, rather than psychological, aspects of psychiatry. Other medical researchers questioned the validity of Huxley's account. According to Roland Fisher, the book contained "99 percent Aldous Huxley and only one half gram mescaline". Joost A.M. Meerloo found Huxley's reactions "not necessarily the same as... other people's experiences."

For Steven J. Novak, The Doors of Perception and Heaven and Hell redefined taking mescaline as a mystical experience with possible psychotherapeutic benefits, where physicians had previously thought of the drug in terms of mimicking a psychotic episode, known as psychotomimetic. The popularity of the book also affected research into these drugs, because researchers needed a random sample of subjects with no preconceptions about the drug to conduct experiments, and these became very difficult to find.

=== Philosophy and religion ===
Huxley's friend and spiritual mentor, the Vedantic monk Swami Prabhavananda, thought that mescaline was an illegitimate path to enlightenment, a "deadly heresy" as Christopher Isherwood put it. Other thinkers expressed similar apprehensions.

==== Martin Buber ====
Martin Buber, the Jewish religious philosopher, attacked Huxley's notion that mescaline allowed a person to participate in "common being", and held that the drug ushered users "merely into a strictly private sphere". Buber believed the drug experiences to be holidays "from the person participating in the community of logos and cosmos—holidays from the very uncomfortable reminder to verify oneself as such a person." For Buber man must master, withstand and alter his situation, or even leave it, "but the fugitive flight out of the claim of the situation into situationlessness is no legitimate affair of man."

==== Robert Charles Zaehner ====
Robert Charles Zaehner, a professor at Oxford University, formed one of the fullest and earliest critiques of The Doors of Perception from a religious and philosophical perspective. In 1954, Zaehner published an article called The Menace of Mescaline, in which he asserted that "artificial interference with consciousness" could have nothing to do with the Christian "Beatific Vision". Zaehner expanded on these criticisms in his book Mysticism Sacred and Profane (1957), which also acts as a theistic riposte to what he sees as the monism of Huxley's The Perennial Philosophy. Although he acknowledged the importance of The Doors of Perception as a challenge to people interested in religious experience, he pointed out what he saw as inconsistencies and self-contradictions. Zaehner concludes that Huxley's apprehensions under mescaline are affected by his deep familiarity with Vedanta and Mahayana Buddhism. So the experience may not be the same for others who take the drug and do not have this background, although they will undoubtedly experience a transformation of sensation. Zaehner himself was a convert to Catholicism.

That the longing to transcend oneself is "one of the principal appetites of the soul" is questioned by Zaehner. There are still people who do not feel this desire to escape themselves, and religion itself need not mean escaping from the ego. Zaehner criticises what he sees as Huxley's apparent call for all religious people to use drugs (including alcohol) as part of their practices. Quoting St Paul's proscriptions against drunkenness in church, in 1 Corinthians xi, Zaehner makes the point that artificial ecstatic states and spiritual union with God are not the same.

Holding that there are similarities between the experience on mescaline, the mania in a manic-depressive psychosis and the visions of God of a mystical saint suggests, for Zaehner, that the saint's visions must be the same as those of a lunatic. The personality is dissipated into the world, for Huxley on mescaline and people in a manic state, which is similar to the experience of nature mystics. However, this experience is different from the theistic mystic who is absorbed into a God, who is quite different from the objective world. The appendices to Mysticism Sacred and Profane include three accounts of mescaline experiences, including those of Zaehner himself. He writes that he was transported into a world of farcical meaninglessness and that the experience was interesting and funny, but not religious.

Soon after the publication of his book, Huxley wrote to Harold Raymond at Chatto and Windus that he thought it strange that when Hilaire Belloc and G. K. Chesterton wrote the praises of alcohol they were still considered good Christians, while anyone who suggested other routes to self-transcendence was accused of being a drug addict and perverter of mankind. Later Huxley responded to Zaehner in an article published in 1961: "For most of those to whom the experiences have been vouchsafed, their value is self-evident. By Dr. Zaehner, the author of Mysticism, Sacred and Profane, their deliberate induction is regarded as immoral. To which his colleague, Professor Price, retorts in effect, 'Speak for yourself!'".

==== Huston Smith ====
Professor of religion and philosophy Huston Smith argued that Mysticism Sacred and Profane had not fully examined and refuted Huxley's claims made in The Doors of Perception. Smith claims that consciousness-changing substances have been linked with religion both throughout history and across the world, and further it is possible that many religious perspectives had their origins in them, which were later forgotten. Acknowledging that personality, preparation and environment all play a role in the effects of the drugs, Huston Smith draws attention to evidence that suggests that a religious outcome of the experience may not be restricted to one of Huxley's temperament. Further, because Zaehner's experience was not religious, does not prove that none will be. Contrary to Zaehner, Huston Smith draws attention to evidence suggesting that these drugs can facilitate theistic mystical experience.

As the descriptions of naturally occurring and drug-stimulated mystical experiences cannot be distinguished phenomenologically, Huston Smith regards Zaehner's position in Mysticism Sacred and Profane, as a product of the conflict between science and religion – that religion tends to ignore the findings of science. Nonetheless, although these drugs may produce a religious experience, they need not produce a religious life, unless set within a context of faith and discipline. Finally, he concludes that psychedelic drugs should not be forgotten in relation to religion because the phenomenon of religious awe, or the encounter with the holy, is declining and religion cannot survive long in its absence.

== Later experience ==
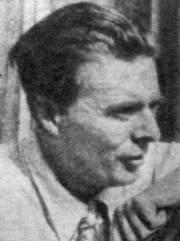
Huxley later wrote that the "things which had entirely filled my attention on that first occasion [chronicled in The Doors of Perception], I now perceived to be temptations – temptations to escape from the central reality into false, or at least imperfect and partial Nirvanas of beauty and mere knowledge."

Huxley continued to take these substances several times a year until his death, but with a serious and temperate frame of mind. He refused to talk about the substances outside scientific meetings, turned down an invitation to talk about them on TV and refused the leadership of a foundation devoted to the study of psychedelics, explaining that they were only one of his diverse number of interests. For Philip Thody, a professor of French literature, Huxley's revelations made him conscious of the objections that had been put forward to his theory of mysticism set out in Eyeless in Gaza and Grey Eminence, and consequently Island reveals a more humane philosophy. However, this change in perspective may lie elsewhere. In October 1955, Huxley had an experience while on mescaline that he considered more profound than those detailed in The Doors of Perception. He decided his previous experiments, the ones detailed in Doors and Heaven and Hell, had been "temptations to escape from the central reality into false, or at least imperfect and partial Nirvanas of beauty and mere knowledge." He wrote in a letter to Humphry Osmond, that he experienced "the direct, total awareness, from the inside, so to say, of Love as the primary and fundamental cosmic fact. ... I was this fact; or perhaps it would be more accurate to say that this fact occupied the place where I had been." The experience made its way into the final chapter of Island. This raised a troublesome point. Was it better to pursue a course of careful psychological experimentation.... or was the real value of these drugs to "stimulate the most basic kind of religious ecstasy"?

== Influence ==
A variety of influences have been claimed for the book. The psychedelic proselytiser Timothy Leary was given the book by a colleague soon after returning from Mexico where he had first taken psilocybin mushrooms in the summer of 1960. He found that The Doors of Perception corroborated what he had experienced 'and more too'. Leary soon set up a meeting with Huxley and the two became friendly. The book can also be seen as a part of the history of entheogenic model of understanding these drugs, that sees them within a spiritual context.

This book was the influence behind Jim Morrison naming his band The Doors in 1965.

== In popular culture ==
In the 2016 film Doctor Strange, Stan Lee's character is seen reading the book, calling it, "hilarious."

== Publication history ==
The Doors of Perception is usually published in a combined volume with Huxley's essay Heaven and Hell (1956)

- The Doors of Perception and Heaven and Hell, 1954, 1956, Harper & Brothers
- 1977 Harpercollins (UK), mass market paperback: ISBN 0-586-04437-X
- 1990 Harper Perennial edition: ISBN 0-06-090007-5
- 2004 Harper Modern Classics edition: ISBN 0-06-059518-3
- 2004 Sagebrush library binding: ISBN 1-4176-2859-6
- 2009 First Harper Perennial Modern Classics edition: ISBN 978-0-06-172907-2
- The Doors of Perception, unabridged audio cassette, Audio Partners 1998, ISBN 1-57270-065-3

== See also ==
- List of psychedelic literature
