= Altered state of consciousness =

Any condition that is significantly different from a normal waking state

An altered state of consciousness (ASC), also called an altered state of mind, altered mental status (AMS), mind alteration, or an altered state of awareness, is a condition significantly different from ordinary waking consciousness, in which normal consciousness is suspended, replaced, or otherwise altered. Such alterations in mental state are generally temporary and are commonly induced, although in the broadest sense sleep itself constitutes an altered state of consciousness.

The term is more commonly applied to induced states, ranging from those produced by drugs to those arising through meditation practices. Debate has concerned whether the various induced states are fundamentally identical or whether states occurring in religious contexts differ in kind. This discussion has also raised the possibility that "altered states of consciousness" may itself constitute a category error by suggesting that a number of discrete neurophysiological or brain states can appropriately be subsumed under a single heading.

== History of the term ==
By 1892, the expression was in use in relation to hypnosis, though there is an ongoing debate as to whether hypnosis is to be identified as an ASC according to its modern definition. The next retrievable instance, by Max Mailhouse from his 1904 presentation to conference, however, is unequivocally identified as such, as it was in relation to epilepsy, and is still used today. In academia, the expression was used as early as 1966 by Arnold M. Ludwig and brought into common usage from 1969 by Charles Tart.

== Definitions ==
There is no general definition of an altered state of consciousness, as any definitional attempt would first have to rely on a definition of a normal state of consciousness. Attempts to define the term can however be found in philosophy, psychology and neuroscience. There is no final consensus on what the most accurate definition is. The best-established and latest definitions are provided below.

Arnold M. Ludwig attempted a first definition in 1966.

An altered state is any mental state(s), induced by various physiological, psychological, or pharmacological maneuvers or agents, which can be recognized subjectively by the individual himself (or by an objective observer of the individual) as representing a sufficient deviation in subjective experience of psychological functioning from certain general norms for that individual during alert, waking consciousness.

Starting from this, Charles Tart focuses his definition on the subjective experience of a state of consciousness and its deviation from a normal waking state.

Altered states of consciousness are alternate patterns or configurations of experience, which differ qualitatively from a baseline state. (Note: "Ordinary waking state is qualitatively distinct from dreaming, for instance, or from being under the influence of a significant amount of alcohol."(Garcia-Romeau, Tart, 2013))

Farthing's definition of an altered state of consciousness (ASC) is based on Charles Tart's terminology. Charles Tart described an altered state of consciousness as a profound change in the "overall pattern of subjective experiences". In order to define an ASC, Tart focuses on the importance of subjective experience.

Farthing adds to his definition that an ASC is short-termed or at least reversible and that it might not even be recognized as an ASC at that moment. His definition relies only on subjective experience, leaving aside behavioral changes and physiological response.

An altered state of consciousness (ASC) may be defined as a temporary change in the overall pattern of subjective experience, such that the individual believes that his or her mental functioning is distinctly different from certain general norms for his or her normal waking state of consciousness. (Farthing, 1992, p. 205)

He lists fourteen dimensions of changed subjective experience. To account for an ASC, multiple dimensions need to be altered.

A working definition for empirical research based on these previous definitions was by Schmidt in 2016:

[Translated from German]: As a working definition for neuroscientific research, it might suffice to presume that most people have a strong intuition concerning which variability in their everyday wakeful state feels normal to them. This variability of experience is considered as normal fluctuation, while any state that is experienced to diverge significantly from it can be called an ASC. From an experimental perspective, it is also reasonable to compare ASC conditions to a baseline state – a state subjectively judged as average, or normal. The comparison with a 'normal' baseline requires that the ASC under investigation is of relatively short duration (minutes to hours), which differentiates ASCs from most pathological conditions. Importantly, it has been emphasized that an ASC is not a mere quantitative change in a single cognitive function (e.g. elevated arousal). Instead, it is a multidimensional phenomenon. Thereby, the relative intensity of multiple consciousness aspects constitutes a 'phenomenological pattern' characterizing a particular state. Such 'patterns' have also been referred to as relative changes in the '(basic) dimensions of consciousness'. For empirical research, such patterns correspond to a multivariate combination of independent 'consciousness factors', which can be quantified via questionnaires. The 'phenomenological pattern' results from the factor structure of the applied psychometric assessment, i.e. the individual ratings, or factor scores, of a questionnaire.

== History ==
=== History of utilization of ASCs ===
Altered states of consciousness might have been employed by humans as early as 30,000 years ago. Mind-altering plants and/or excessive dancing were used to attain an ecstatic or mystic state. Examples of early religious use of altered states of consciousness are the rites of Dionysus and the Eleusinian Mysteries, as well as yoga and meditation. Followers of various shamanic traditions "enter altered states of consciousness in order to serve their community." Terence McKenna has suggested that the use of psychedelic mushrooms in prehistoric times has led to the "evolution of human language and symbol use". Some theorists propose that mind-altering substances, such as soma, might have pushed the formation of some of the world's main religions.

Meditation in its various forms is being rediscovered by modern psychology because of its therapeutic potential and its ability to "enable the activity of the mind to settle down". In psychotherapy, techniques like hypnosis and meditation support psychological processes.

=== History of scientific study ===
Due to the behaviourist paradigm in psychology altered states of consciousness were dismissed as a field of scientific inquiry during the early 20th century. They were pathologized and merely seen as symptoms of intoxication or demonic possession.

Their return into psychology began with William James's interest into a variety of altered states, such as "mystical experiences and drug-induced states". James' investigations into first-person-subjective-experience contributed to the reconsideration of introspection as a valuable research method in the academic community.

The social change of the turbulent 1960s has decisively led to a change of the scientific perspective to the point that introspection as a scientific method and ASCs as valid realms of experience became more widely accepted. Foundations for the research have been laid out by various scientists such as Abraham Maslow, Walter N. Pahnke, Stanislav Grof, and Charles Tart. They focused on seemingly beneficial aspects of ASCs such as their potential to "promote creativity or treat addiction". Rather oppressive states such as dissociation from trauma were neglected.

The findings of the famous Good Friday Experiment by Pahnke suggest that mystical experiences can be triggered by psilocybin. Later investigations by Rick Doblin found that participants valued those experiences as "spiritual high points of their lives".

In the midst of the rise of new-age subculture Stanislav Grof and others formed the new field of transpersonal psychology, which emphasized "the importance of individual human experience, validity of mystical and spiritual experience, interconnectedness of self with others and the world and potential of self-transformation".

Abraham Maslow's research on peak experiences, as moments of "highest happiness and fulfillment", further contributed to the depathologization of altered states.

A first summary of the existing literature was carried out by Charles T. Tart in his book Altered States of Consciousness, which led to a more common use of the term. Tart coined the key terms discrete (Note: "a unique, dynamic pattern or configuration of psychological structures" (Tart,1969). Classic examples of discrete states of consciousness include waking, dreaming, deep sleep, intoxication, hypnosis, and successfully induced meditative states, to name just a few.) and baseline states of consciousness, and thought about a general classification system for ASCs. He also called for "state specific sciences" in which researchers should do science on ASCs from within such states.

== Classification ==
A simple classification scheme for ASC. Sleep and dream states are distinguished from waking consciousness since they account for substantially different ways of the ability of memory formation and retrieval. Psychiatric diseases that go along with persistent changes of consciousness, like schizophrenia, are covered with the term "pathological conditions". In contrast, the classification scheme includes intended and induced ASCs as well as general fluctuations of neurotransmission, which are reversible and short-termed. One step further, the graph suggests splitting induced ASCs in persistent and reversible states. Translated from German Schmidt & Majic.

A classification of altered states of consciousness is helpful for comparing or differentiating induced ASCs and other variations of consciousness. Various researchers have attempted the classification into a broader framework. The attempts of classification discussed in the following focus on slightly different aspects of ASCs. Several authors suggested classification schemata with regard to the genesis of altered states and with regard to the type of experiences:

A classification with five categories was suggested by Dieter Vaitl to distinguish ASCs according to how they were induced:

- Pathological (Epilepsy, brain damage)
- Pharmacological (psychoactive substances)
- Physical and physiological (fasting and sex)
- Psychological (music, meditation, hypnosis)
- Spontaneous (day-dreaming and near death experience)

Vaitl further suggests four basic aspects of experiences: (1) activation, (2) awareness span, (3) self-awareness, and (4) sensory dynamics. Alternatively, Roland Fischer suggests a classification along ergotropic (i.e., ecstasy) or trophotropic (i.e., meditation) properties. The work of Adolph Dittrich aimed to empirically determine common underlying dimensions of consciousness alterations induced by different methods, such as drugs or non-pharmacological methods. He suggested three basic dimensions, which were termed (1) oceanic boundlessness, (2) dread of ego dissolution, and (3) visionary restructuralization. Further, Ken Wilber proposes a multidimensional system and adds that the individual experience of an ASC is shaped by a person's unique psychological development.

Michael Winkelman argues that there are four different "modes of consciousness": (1) the waking mode, (2) the deep sleep mode, (3) the REM sleep / dreaming mode, and (4) the integrative mode. Within this framework, many ASCs (psychedelics, hypnosis, meditation, etc.) are defined as belonging to the integrative mode.

== Induction methods ==
=== Pharmacological ===
An altered state of consciousness may be defined as a short-term change in the general configuration of one's individual experience, such that the rational functioning is clearly altered from one's usual state of consciousness. There are many ways that one's consciousness can be altered, such as by using psychoactive drugs, which are defined as chemical substances that pass through the blood–brain barrier and disturb brain function, causing changes in awareness, attitude, consciousness, and behavior.

Cannabis is a psychoactive drug that is known to alter the state of consciousness. Cannabis alters mental activity, memory, and pain perception. One who is under the influence of cannabis may experience degrees of paranoia, increased sensitivity, and delayed reactions not normal for their usual conscious state. A 2009 review of anxiety and cannabis studies concluded that "frequent cannabis users appear to have higher levels of anxiety than non-users," and that "a considerable number of subjects developed anxiety disorders before the first symptoms of cannabis dependence." That led researchers to believe that anxiety-prone people tend to use cannabis as a self-prescribed anxiety medicine, opposing the idea that cannabis is what causes the anxiety.

MDMA (ecstasy) is a drug that also alters one's state of consciousness. The state of consciousness brought about by MDMA ingestion includes a rise in positive feelings and a reduction in negative feelings (Aldridge, D., & Fachner, J. ö. 2005). Users' emotions are increased and inhibitions lowered, often accompanied by a sensation of intimacy or connection with other people.

Opioids are a class of drugs that alter consciousness. Examples of opioids include heroin, morphine, hydrocodone, and oxycodone. Opioids produce analgesia and often feelings of euphoria in users. Opioid abuse may result in decreased production of endorphins in the brain, natural pain relievers whose effects may be heightened by drugs.

Cocaine alters one's state of consciousness. Cocaine affects the neurotransmitters that nerves use to communicate with each other. Cocaine inhibits the reuptake of norepinephrine, serotonin, dopamine, and other neurotransmitters in the synapse, resulting in an altered state of consciousness or a "high" (Aldridge, D., & Fachner, J. ö. 2005).

Lysergic acid diethylamide, or LSD, activates serotonin receptors (the amine transmitter of nerve urges) in brain matter. LSD acts on certain serotonin receptors, and its effects are most prominent in the cerebral cortex, an area involved in attitude, thought, and insight, which obtains sensory signs from all parts of the body. LSD's main effects are emotional and psychological. The ingester's feelings may alter quickly through a range from fear to ecstasy (Humphrey, N. 2001). This may cause one to experience many levels of altered consciousness. It has also been shown to induce ego death (or ego dissolution).

Alcohol alters consciousness by shifting levels of neurotransmitters. Neurotransmitters are endogenous chemicals that transmit signals across a synapse from one neuron (nerve cell) to another "target" cell (often another neuron). Neurotransmitters can cause inhibitory or excitatory effects on the "target" cell they are affecting. Alcohol increases the effect of the neurotransmitter GABA (gamma-aminobutyric acid) in the brain. GABA causes slow actions and inaudible verbal communication that often occur in alcoholics. Alcohol also decreases the excitatory neurotransmitter glutamate. Suppressing this stimulant results in a similar type of physiological slowdown. In addition to increasing the GABA and decreasing the glutamate in the brain, alcohol increases the amount of the chemical dopamine in the brain, which is one of the addictive causes of alcoholism.

=== Non-pharmacological ===
Altered states of consciousness may also be induced by:

- Hypnosis
- Meditation
- (variations of) Holotropic breathwork
- Dark retreat
- Rhythmic shamanic drumming
- Ecstatic dance
- Sensory deprivation
- Near-death experience

Emotions influence behavior that alters the state of consciousness. Emotions can be influenced by various stimuli.

=== Pathologies/other ===
Pathological or accidental induction may refer to unforeseen events or illnesses. According to Jeffrey R. Avner, professor of clinical pediatrics, a crucial element to understanding accidental and pathological causes of ASCs is that it begins with reduced self-awareness followed by reduced awareness in the environment (2006). Those with personal experience of conditions such as depersonalisation often cite the opposite, that it is an increased awareness of the environment and the self that results in altered states of consciousness. When the reduction of self-awareness and environmental awareness take effect, they produce altered states of consciousness. The specific conditions below provide clarity on the types of conditions compromise accidental and pathological causes.

==== Traumatic experience ====
The first condition, traumatic experience, is defined as a lesion caused by an external force (Trauma. (n.d.) In Merriam-Webster Dictionary Online, 2013). Examples include impact to the brain caused by blunt force (i.e., a car accident). The reason a traumatic experience causes altered states of consciousness is that it changes how the brain works. The external impact diverts the blood flow from the front of the brain to other areas. The front of the brain is known as the prefrontal cortex responsible for analytical thought (Kunsman, 2012). When the damage becomes uncontrollable, the patient experiences changes in behavior and impaired self-awareness. This is exactly when an altered state of consciousness is experienced.

==== Epilepsy ====
Another common cause of ASCs is epilepsy. According to MedlinePlus epilepsy is as a brain disorder that causes seizures (2013). During the seizure, the patient will experience hallucinations and loss of mental control, causing temporary dissociation from reality. A study that was conducted with six epileptic patients and used functional magnetic resonance imaging (fMRI) detected that the patients did indeed experience hallucinations while a seizure is occurring. This not only altered the patient's behavioral pattern but also made them dissociate from reality during that particular time frame.

==== Oxygen deficiency ====
Oxygen deficiency impacts the brain, which is why ASCs can occur when there is oxygen deprivation in an environment.

==== Infections ====
In addition to oxygen deprivation or deficiency, infections are a common pathological cause of ASC. A prime example of an infection is meningitis. The medical website WebMD states that meningitis is an infection that causes the coverings of the brain to swell. This particular infection occurs in children and young adults. This infection is primarily viral. Viral meningitis causes ASC and its symptoms include fevers and seizures (2010). The impairment becomes visible the moment seizures begin to occur; this is when the patient enters the altered state of consciousness.

==== Sleep deprivation ====
Sleep deprivation is also associated with ASCs, and can provoke seizures due to fatigue. Sleep deprivation can be chronic or short-term depending on the severity of the patient's condition. Many patients report hallucinations because sleep deprivation impacts the brain. An MRI study conducted at Harvard Medical School in 2007 found that a sleep-deprived brain was not capable of being in control of its sensorimotor functions, leading to impaired self-awareness. Patients were also much clumsier than if they had not been experiencing sleep deprivation.

==== Fasting ====
Fasting is another form of deprivation. Fasting can be deliberate, including for religious reasons or from psychological conditions such as anorexia. Fasting refers to the ability to willingly refrain from food and possibly drinks as well. The dissociation caused by fasting is not only life-threatening but is also the reason why extended fasting periods can lead to ASC. Thus, the temporary dissociation from reality allows fasting to fall into the category of an ASC following the definition provided by Avner (2006).

==== Psychosis ====
Another pathological cause is psychosis, otherwise known as a psychotic episode. Psychotic episodes often include delusions, paranoia, derealization, depersonalization, and hallucinations (Revonsuo et al., 2008). Studies have not been able to clearly identify when a person is reaching a higher level of risk for a psychotic episode (Schimmelmann, B., Walger, P., & Schultze-Lutter, F., 2013), but the earlier people are treated for psychosis the more likely they are to avoid the devastating consequences which could lead to a psychotic disorder (Schimmelmann, B., Walger, P., & Schultze-Lutter, F., 2013). Unfortunately, there are very few studies which have thoroughly investigated psychotic episodes, and the ability to predict this disorder remains unclear (Schimmelmann, B., Walger, P., & Schultze-Lutter, F., 2013).

Reviewing the previous conditions for accidental and pathological causes, we can come to understand that all of these accidental or pathological causes share the component of reduced self-awareness. Therefore, ASCs cannot only be caused naturally but they can be induced intentionally with methods including hypnosis meditation, amongst others. There are also ASCs which are caused by less recreational purposes; people who utilize illegal substances, or heavy dosages of medications, as well as large amounts of alcohol, can indeed comply with the definition of an ASC (Revonsuo et al., 2008).

== Neurobiological models of altered state experiences ==
=== Entropic brain hypothesis ===
The entropic brain hypothesis by Robin Carhart-Harris in 2014 is a theory informed by neuroimaging research that uses the hallucinogen-induced neurological state to make inferences about other states of consciousness. The expression "entropy" is applied here in the context of states of consciousness and their associated neurodynamics, where high entropy means a high level of disorder. The theory proposes a general distinction between two fundamentally different modes of cognition, referred to as primary and secondary consciousness.

Primary consciousness is associated with unconstrained cognition and less ordered (higher-entropy) neurodynamics that precede the development of modern, normal waking consciousness in adults. Examples include the rapid eye movement sleep (REM), transcendental state between REM sleep and sensory awareness (the psychedelic state), or the onset phase of psychosis. Secondary consciousness is associated with constrained cognition and more ordered neurodynamics. Examples include normal waking consciousness, the anesthetized, or the depressed state.

The theory further proposes that via pharmacological induction of psychedelic substances like psilocybin, the brain is able to enter into the primary state of consciousness (the psychedelic state) from normal waking consciousness. This "phase transition" between these two fundamentally different poles of consciousness is facilitated by a collapse of the normally highly organized activity within the default mode network (DMN) and a decoupling between the DMN and the medial temporal lobes (MTLs), which are normally significantly coupled. The DMN is closely associated with higher-order cognitive functions such as supporting the neurological basis for the self (e.g. self-reflection, subjectivity, introspection), thinking about others (e.g. theory of mind), remembering the past and thinking about the future (e.g. episodic memory). Task-positive networks are associated with the inverse of these things e.g., focus on and scrutiny of the external world.

The entropic brain hypothesis emphasizes the great research potential of the psychedelic state of mind for gaining more insight into general human consciousness.

=== CSTC-loop ===
Extensive scientific investigation on altered states of consciousness and their relationship to drug interactions with receptors in the brain have been performed. Particularly the study of the neurotransmitter serotonin and the effects of psychedelic drugs on the brain has been intensively researched over the past sixty years. It has been hypothesized that hallucinogens act either as an antagonist or an agonist at 5-HT_{2A} (serotonin-2A) receptors and will elicit a state that shares some common phenomenological features with early acute stages of the group of schizophrenia disorders.

Findings implicate that abnormalities of serotonin function and the serotonergic system could be responsible for psychiatric disorders such as the spectrum of schizophrenia (gating) disorders, and therefore, that serotonin agonist or antagonists might be useful in the treatment of disorders such as schizophrenia. To investigate the underlying causative neurotransmitter mechanisms of this phenomenon, the CSTC (cortico-striato-thalamo-cortical) loop model has been formulated based on empirical neurobiological work. It is indicated that the common hypofrontality (underactivation of frontal brain regions) and cortical activation pattern induced by serotonergic and glutamatergic hallucinogens is due to a common disruption of thalamic gating of sensory and cognitive information. The CSTC feedback loop plays a major role in gating or filtering out external and internal information to the cortex. Thereby it influences the regulation of the level of awareness and attention.

Disruption of the CSTC loop system is proposed to significantly influence information processing, for instance, the ability to screen out, inhibit, filter, or gate extraneous stimuli and to direct selective attention to salient features of the environment. Failures of these attentional gating mechanisms might overload patients with the excessive processing of both sensory and cognitive stimuli, which could lead to a breakdown of cognitive integrity and difficulty in distinguishing self from non-self and failure to integrate an overwhelming flood of information. Descriptive elaboration of the mentioned effects can be found in the literature on schizophrenia as well as in descriptions of hallucinogenic drug action.

Despite strong evidence linking serotonin and psychosis, novel research indicates that some behavioral effects of drugs such as psilocybin appear to be independent of the classical 5-HT_{2A} receptor-agonist actions, implying that the model described here is not the only underlying framework at play. Interdisciplinary research enterprises have set out to study the convergence of serotonergic and glutamatergic models of psychosis and dynamic neurotransmitter interactions, derived from the study of hallucinogenic drugs, in the future.

=== Synthetic surprise ===
Synthetic surprise is a theoretical concept explaining the altered states of consciousness induced by psychedelic substances like LSD and psilocybin. Central to this concept is the activation of the 5-HT_{2A} receptor by psychedelics. The hypothesis suggests that these substances induce a state of synthetic surprise through the selective activation of the 5-HT receptors system, based on recent insights supporting a role of 5-HT in signaling surprise. This state aligns with the 'prediction error' in the predictive coding framework of brain function, where there is a discrepancy between the brain's expectations and the actual sensory input. The precision of this sensory data is crucial in modifying the brain's pre-existing beliefs or 'priors'. Under the influence of psychedelics, the interplay between top-down expectations and bottom-up sensory information is altered, leading to the characteristic changes in consciousness. Hallucinations in this context can be explained by the previously proposed "Strong priors" theory. This understanding of synthetic surprise has significant implications for the clinical use of psychedelic substances. The ability of psychedelics to induce surprise is proposed to be central to their therapeutic potential, especially in disrupting maladaptive cognitive and perceptual patterns.

== See also ==
- Absorption (psychology)
- Altered level of consciousness
- Delirium
- Flow (psychology)
- Hydrogen narcosis
- Lucid dreaming
- Night of Pan
- Psychonautics
- Runner's high
- Sensory deprivation
- Trance

== Sources ==
- "Harvard Heart Letter examines the costs of not getting enough sleep – Harvard Health Publications". Health.harvard.edu. 31 May 2012. Retrieved 2012-08-13.
- Aldridge, D., & Fachner, J. ö. (2005). Chapter 7: Music and drug-induced altered states of consciousness. (pp. 82–96)
- Avner JR (2006). "Altered states of consciousness". Pediatrics in Review. 27 (9): 331–8. doi:10.1542/pir.27-9-331. PMID 16950938. S2CID 2988071.
- Bosinelli Marino (1995). "Mind and consciousness during sleep". Research Report on Behavioural Brain Research. 69 (1–2): 195–201. doi:10.1016/0166-4328(95)00003-c. PMID 7546311. S2CID 3983025.
- Bosinelli Marino, PierCarlaCicogna (2001). "Consciousness during Dreams". Consciousness and Cognition. 10 (1): 26–41. doi:10.1006/ccog.2000.0471. PMID 11273624. S2CID 13216554.
- Calkins Mary (1893). "Statistics of Dreams". The American Journal of Psychology. 5 (3): 311–343. doi:10.2307/1410996. JSTOR 1410996.
- Connor C., Birchwood M., Palmer C., Channa S., Freemantle N., Lester H., Singh S. (2013). "Don't turn your back on the symptoms of psychosis: a proof-of-principle, quasi-experimental public health trial to reduce the duration of untreated psychosis in Birmingham, UK". BMC Psychiatry. 13 (1): 1–6. doi:10.1186/1471-244X-13-67. PMC 3599688. PMID 23432935.
- Dennett Daniel C (1976). "Are Dreams Experiences". The Philosophical Review. 85 (2): 151–171. doi:10.2307/2183728. JSTOR 2183728. S2CID 170291647.
- Edwards D., Harris J. A., Biersner R. (1976). "Encoding and decoding of connected discourse during altered states of consciousness". Journal of Psychology. 92 (1): 97–102. doi:10.1080/00223980.1976.9921340. PMID 1263155.
- Englot D, Rutkowski M, Ivan M, Sun P, Kuperman R, Chang E, Auguste K (2013). "Effects of temporal lobectomy on consciousness-impairing and consciousness-sparing seizures in children". Child's Nervous System. 29 (10): 1915–1922. doi:10.1007/s00381-013-2168-7. PMID 23723065. S2CID 25985596.
- Farthing GW (1992). The psychology of consciousness. Englewood Cliffs, N.J.: Prentice Hall. ISBN 978-0-13-728668-3.
- Humphrey N (2001). "Introduction: Altered states". Social Research. 68 (3): 585–587.
- Louis Breger. (1967) Function of Dreams. Journal of Abnormal Psychology Monograph, Vol 72, No. 5, Part 2 of 2 Parts, 1–28
- Meningitis - Topic Overview (December 8, 2010) from: Meningitis (Bacterial, Viral, and Fungal)
- Revonsuo A., Kallio S., Sikka P. (2009). "What is an altered state of consciousness?". Philosophical Psychology. 22 (2): 187–204. doi:10.1080/09515080902802850. S2CID 55819447.
- Revonsuo A., Kallio S., Sikka P. (2009). "What is an altered state of consciousness?". Philosophical Psychology. 22 (2): 187–204. doi:10.1080/09515080902802850. S2CID 55819447.
- Spikman J. M., Milders M. V., Visser-Keizer A. C., Westerhof-Evers H. J., Herben-Dekker M., van der Naalt J. (2013). "Deficits in Facial Emotion Recognition Indicate Behavioral Changes and Impaired Self-Awareness after Moderate to Severe Traumatic Brain Injury". PLOS ONE. 8 (6): 1–7. Bibcode:2013PLoSO...865581S. doi:10.1371/journal.pone.0065581. PMC 3680484. PMID 23776505.
- Taheri S, Lin L, Austin D, Young T, Mignot E (2004). "Short Sleep Duration Is Associated with Reduced Leptin, Elevated Ghrelin, and Increased Body Mass Index". PLOS Med. 1 (3) e62. doi:10.1371/journal.pmed.0010062. PMC 535701. PMID 15602591.
- ValdasNorekia, Windt Jennifer M (2011). "How to integrate dreaming into a general theory of consciousness- A critical review of existing positions and suggestions for future research". Journal of Consciousness and Cognition. 20 (4): 1091–1107. doi:10.1016/j.concog.2010.09.010. PMID 20933438. S2CID 9831999.
