= Springville High School (Utah) =

Coordinates: 40°09′18″N 111°35′17″W

Location
- 1205 E. 900 S., Springville, Utah 84663; Springville, Utah; United States

Information
- Type: Public high school
- Established: 1902
- School district: Nebo School District
- Principal: Robert Fleming
- Teaching staff: 73.55 (FTE)
- Grades: 10–12
- Enrollment: 1,665 (2024-2025)
- Student to teacher ratio: 22.64
- Campus: Suburban
- Colors: Red, blue and white
- Mascot: Red Devils
- Nickname: SHS
- Affiliation: Nebo School District
- Superintendent: Rick Neilson
- Motto: Dedicated to Excellence – United in Service – Educated for Success
- Website: Springville High School

Springville High School is one of the two high schools that serve Springville, Utah, United States.

== History ==
On January 9, 1902, the trustees of Springville school district called a meeting and agreed to establish a high school to better accommodate the children of the district. This was an almost unanimous opinion of those present. This marked the beginning of the first Springville High School. Two school buildings were agreed on to be built then as well. Sites for these new school houses were decided on the week later.

== Mascot ==
Springville High School's mascot is the "Red Devils". The first reference in the press to anything resembling "Red Devils" dates back to 1923 during a tournament of state basketball champions from several western states, where the Springville starters were said to have "played like demons". The earliest use of the "Red Devil" moniker occur in Springville Herald reports of the 1926 Springville High football season.

The second incorrect story is often circulated that the mascot name comes from the original construction of the school, when the Red Devil Cement Company allegedly assisted with the building, including an actual cement bag with the Red Devil Cement logo on it that can be found in one of the display cases in the high school.

The mascot has come under fire multiple times, the most recent opposition occurring when local citizens organized a committee titled "Parents for Mascot Review". These parents challenged the mascot by stating its common use as a symbol of evil as well as noting the racial connotations. In a letter to Nebo School District, the president of the Navajo Nation stated that "the use of the term 'Red Devils' lends or conveys the immediate opinion of assertion of offensive racial commentary." Despite these efforts, the mascot remains unchanged as of 2023.

== Athletics ==
Springville High School has posted regional championships in tennis, cross country, soccer, golf, volleyball, swimming, football and basketball.

The Red Devil swim team won back-to-back boys' 4A state championships in 2008 and 2009. The championships of 2008 and 2009 mark the first time a boys' team of any sport at SHS has won back-to-back titles.

The boys' basketball team won the 2017 4A basketball championship, under Coach Justin Snell, for the first time since 1958. In 2020, the boys' basketball team won the 5A state, Coach Snell's second title in four years. The girls' basketball team was 5A runner up. In 2021 the girls team snatch the 5A state title.

In 2017, the boys' track team won the 5A state title and followed by the 5A title in 2018.

In 2016, the Springville High School Boys Cross Country won the at large bid to go to the prestigious Nike Cross National race. The team placed 15th overall. In 2017, the team placed 5th at the race under head coach Samantha Smith. In 2017, the boys' team won the 5A state championship. The girls' team won the 5A state title in 2018, 2019, 2020, 2021 and 2022. In the 2019, 2020, and 2021 region eight Cross Country meet, Springville achieved the first place position in every race.

== Notable alumni ==
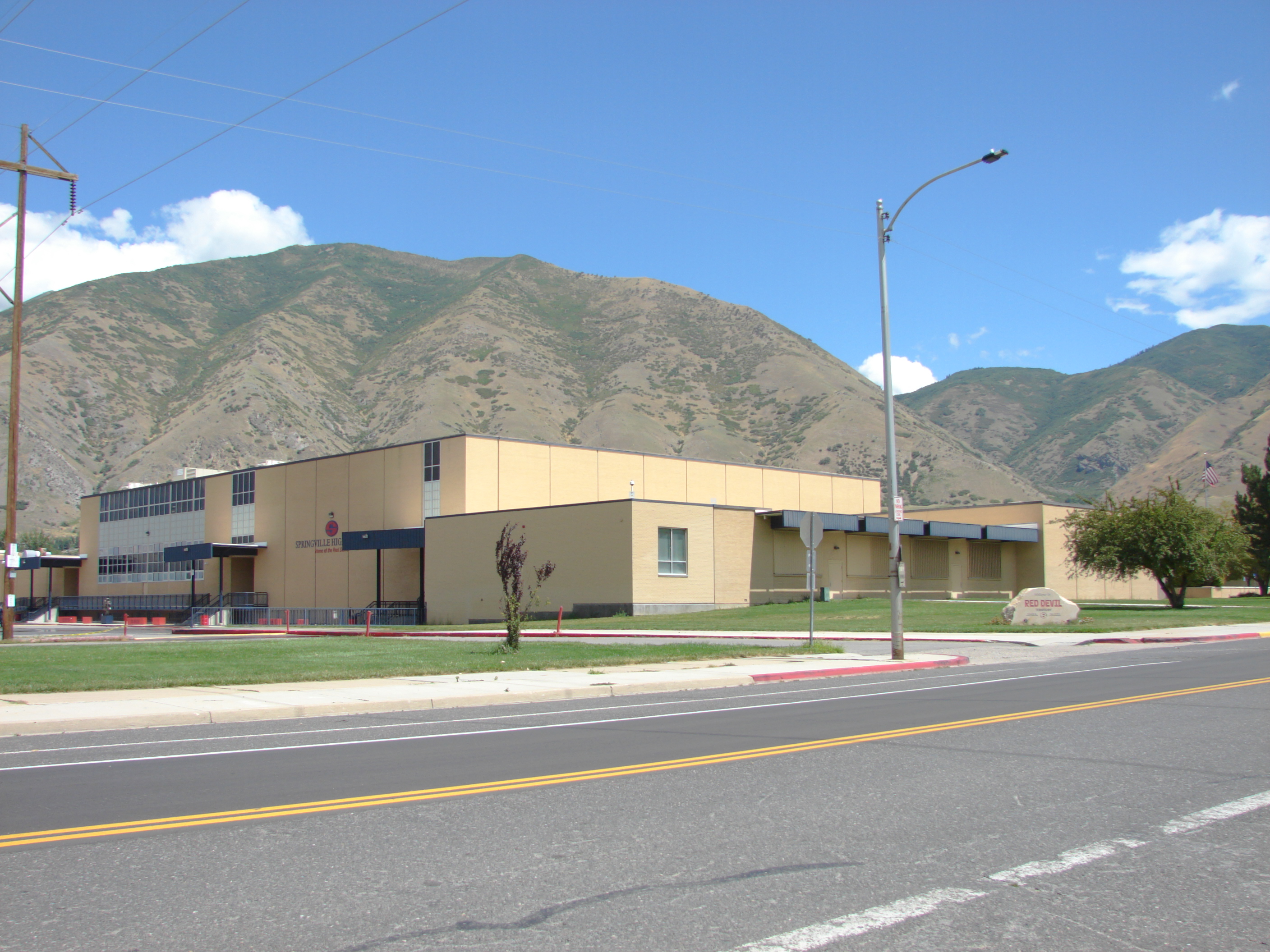
Springville High School, August 2015

- Charity Anderson, dancer on season 2 of World of Dance, specializing in acro and contemporary dance
- Don Bluth, animator, film producer and director
- William R. Bradford, General Authority of The Church of Jesus Christ of Latter-Day Saints
- George Dewey Clyde, Governor of Utah
- Creed Haymond (1893–1983), Olympic and world-record track athlete
- Eli Herring, of the National Football League
- Thayne Jasperson, Broadway actor, singer, and choreographer, most notable for Hamilton (musical)
- Bryan Johnson, founder of Braintree, OS Fund and Kernel
- Wendell B. Mendenhall, the Father of the Polynesian Cultural Center
- Scott Mitchell, of the National Football League
- Roger Reid, college basketball coach (BYU, Snow College, Southern Utah University) and NBA assistant coach (Phoenix Suns)

== See also ==
- Nebo School District
