= Kate Tolo =

Australian marketer, businesswoman, and biohacker

- Born: 1995 or 1996 (age 30–31); Mackay, Queensland, Australia
- Education: University of Canberra
- Occupations: Marketer, businesswoman, and biohacker
- Partner: Bryan Johnson

Kate Tolo (born 1995 or 1996) is an Australian entrepreneur and marketing executive. After initially working at Kernel, she co-founded Blueprint, Immortals, and Don't Die with Bryan Johnson. Tolo has since become prominent within the biohacking and longevity movement. She is best known for her focus on female health, which has historically received comparatively less attention than male-focused topics within the biohacking community.

== Early life ==
Tolo was born and raised in Mackay, Queensland, Australia, with her siblings Adam and Marianna. Marianna is an Australian Olympic basketball player. Tolo also attended the University of Canberra with her sister, graduating with a Bachelor of Fashion degree. She graduated at age 20 after interning at Proenza Schouler.

== Career ==
She then moved roles to become Technical Design Assistant role with R13 in the Brooklyn borough of New York City, before working with outdoor clothing company The North Face. At The North Face, she was promoted to the role of senior manager of global design operations, leading 70 people.

In 2016, she became interested in working with Bryan Johnson after reading a quote of him advocating for humans to fuse with AI. She messaged him frequently without receiving any response for four years, before ultimately, during the 2020 COVID-19 epidemic, applying for and being hired for a job at Kernel, his neurotech company. She has stated that in 2021, when she first met him in person, she fell in love with him at first sight, and eighteen months later they began a relationship. At the time, he was preparing to launch Project Blueprint, but it was not receiving traction. Tolo recommended sharing his data with the world, and the organization soon gained media attention. She joined as co-founder and chief marketing officer.

Tolo's role within Blueprint became more public in 2023 as she became the first woman to undertake the Blueprint anti-aging protocol. She then appeared on the documentary Don't Die: The Man Who Wants to Live Forever as Blueprint's Chief Marketing Officer in early 2025. In 2025, Blueprint raised $60 million from outside investors. She titled her section of Project Blueprint "Blueprint XX". She stated at the time her goal was different from Johnson's goal of avoiding death: "I don't mind the idea of death, if it happens it happens. But I would love to be able to spend each minute living as much as possible." She utilized a less intense program than Johnson's.

She has since co-founded Immortals, a longevity company, with Johnson. In December 2025, she and Johnson revealed their relationship. She tweeted in early 2026 that she "could not be more proud" of Johnson for tweeting her vaginal health test results with the caption "100/100 score. Top 1 per cent of all vaginas".

In 2026, Tolo began a new study with a goal of increasing focus on women's health and female-centred approaches to biohacking and longevity. This included studying the menstrual cycle, her vaginal microbiome, and almost 1900 factors with close to 15,000,000 data points. The $2.6 million per year project was to be funded by Immortals. Her N-of-1 study became public after she shared her diagnosis of having three gynaecological conditions, endometriosis, adenomyosis and polyendocrine metabolic ovarian syndrome (PMOS).

Her public sharing has been met with praise for raising awareness about women's health. It has also been met with scepticism; Arwa Mahdavi, for The Guardian, stated the initiative is "to be applauded. It's helping break down the stigma attached to menstruation, and it's raising awareness for women's health", but also pondered whether it could also be partially a marketing campaign for Immortals, which is preparing to launch a line of products specifically for women.

She is also the co-founder of ideological movement Don't Die, along with Johnson, focused on longevity. She has jokingly referred to it as a cult.

== Personal life ==
In 2026, she learned she had endometriosis, adenomyosis, and polyendocrine metabolic ovarian syndrome after undergoing tests at the beginning of her routine. She has since made one of her goals learning more about her own body.
