= Don't Die =

Don't Die may refer to:

== Music ==
- Don't Die, an album by State Shirt (Ethan Tufts), 2004
- "Good (Don't Die)", a song by ¥$, 2024
- "Don't Die", a song by Birdman and Lil Wayne from Like Father, Like Son, 2006
- "Don't Die", a song by Killer Mike from R.A.P. Music, 2012
- "Don't Die", a song by Suicide Silence from You Can't Stop Me, 2014
- "Don't Die", a song by Tory Lanez from Memories Don't Die, 2018

== Other uses ==
- Don't Die, a 2023 book by Bryan Johnson
- Don't Die: The Man Who Wants to Live Forever, a 2025 American documentary film about Johnson
