= Single-subject =

Single-subject may refer to:

- Single-subject design, a research design in which the subject serves as his/her own control
- Single-subject dictionary, a specialized dictionary that has been designed and compiled to cover the terms of one particular subject field
- Single-subject literature, a work of writing upon a single subject
- Single-subject research, a group of research methods that are used extensively in the experimental analysis of behavior and applied behavior analysis
- Single-subject rule, a section present in many state constitutions within the United States of America
