= Project Blueprint =

Project Blueprint may refer to:

- Project Blueprint (anti-aging), an anti-aging regimen by Bryan Johnson
- Supercars Championship, which has a formula called "Project Blueprint"
