= ScribeAmerica =

Medical scribe provider

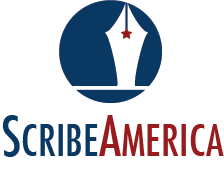
- ScribeAmerica logo
- Company type: Private
- Industry: Healthcare
- Founded: 2003; 23 years ago Lancaster, California, U.S.
- Founders: Michael Murphy; Luis Moreno
- Headquarters: Fort Lauderdale, Florida, U.S.
- Area served: United States
- Key people: Dave King CEO
- Services: Medical scribe
- Revenue: ▲$76 million (2014)
- Number of employees: 4,635 (2014)
- Website: scribeamerica.com

ScribeAmerica is a provider of medical scribes to hospitals and medical practices. Co-founders Michael Murphy and Luis Moreno met in 2002 and founded ScribeAmerica the following year in Lancaster, California. ScribeAmerica was headquartered in Aventura, Florida but recently moved its main offices to a larger facility in Fort Lauderdale, Florida.

The company had an annual revenue of $32.1 million in 2012. In August 2014, the company had 4,100 scribes in 610 hospitals. As of December 2014, the company had 4,635 employees across 580 contracts. ScribeAmerica acquired Medical Scribe Systems (Emergency Medicine Scribe Systems Inc.) in 2015 and PhysAssist, a competing scribe company, in November 2018. In the Wall Street Journal, Murphy estimated 10,000 medical scribes work in the United States, mostly in emergency rooms.

The Affordable Care Act offers incentives to the adoption of electronic medical record-keeping. ScribeAmerica is the most frequently-used medical scribe provider in the United States and documented 7 million patient visits in 2012. Since the Health Information Technology for Economic and Clinical Health Act passed in 2009, the company has grown 90-100% each year.
