= Nexiona Connectocrats =

- Company type: Private
- Industry: Internet of things
- Predecessor: M2M Cloud Factory
- Founded: 2012
- Founder: Jaume Rey
- Headquarters: Barcelona, Catalonia, Spain
- Area served: Spain
- Key people: Jaume Rey (CEO)
- Website: nexiona.com

Nexiona Connectocrats is a Spanish software company that develops Internet of Things (IoT) solutions. Jaume Rey, a technology entrepreneur, founded M2M Cloud Factory in 2011 and renamed it Nexiona Connectocrats in 2016. Nexiona is based in Barcelona and helps integrate hardware and software to build private IoT platforms on the Cloud or on site.

== History ==
In 2011, Rey, the company CEO, founded M2M Cloud Factory dedicated to the remote maintenance via the Internet of connected devices. Then, the company developed the MIIMETIQ technology as the core of all its current products with a focus on industry 4.0, building automation, e-health and the retail industry. Nexiona received a grant of €1,000,000 from Horizon 2020, a European Union research and innovation programme for SMEs. The grant is intended for the improvement of the application. In 2016, the company decided to adopt the name Nexiona Connectocrats and expand its operations to Oxford, U.K. and Munich, Germany.
