= Task Force for National Strategy for Information Society Development =

The Task Force for National Strategy for Information Society Development was a group of experts gathered for the purpose of creating the National Strategy for Information Society Development for North Macedonia.

The Task Force was an interdisciplinary team composed of 33 experts from various sectors (governmental, business, educational, developmental and civic) and included current and former MPs, a mayor, IT experts affiliated with the major political parties, and a counselor from the President's cabinet. The work focused on identifying the mechanisms and the legal and fiscal framework necessary for the implementation of initiatives in seven main categories: infrastructure, e-business, e-government, e-education, e-health, e-citizens, and legislation, as well as an additional focus on sustainability. The goal was to create modern and efficient ICT services for citizens and businesses in all spheres of life.

The National Strategy was adopted by the Government on June 16, 2005, and by the Assembly of North Macedonia on September 21, 2005. Public forums were organized in several towns throughout North Macedonia, and also on the Information Technology Committee website, in order to involve the public in creating the final draft.
