= Bryan Johnson =

American entrepreneur (born 1977)

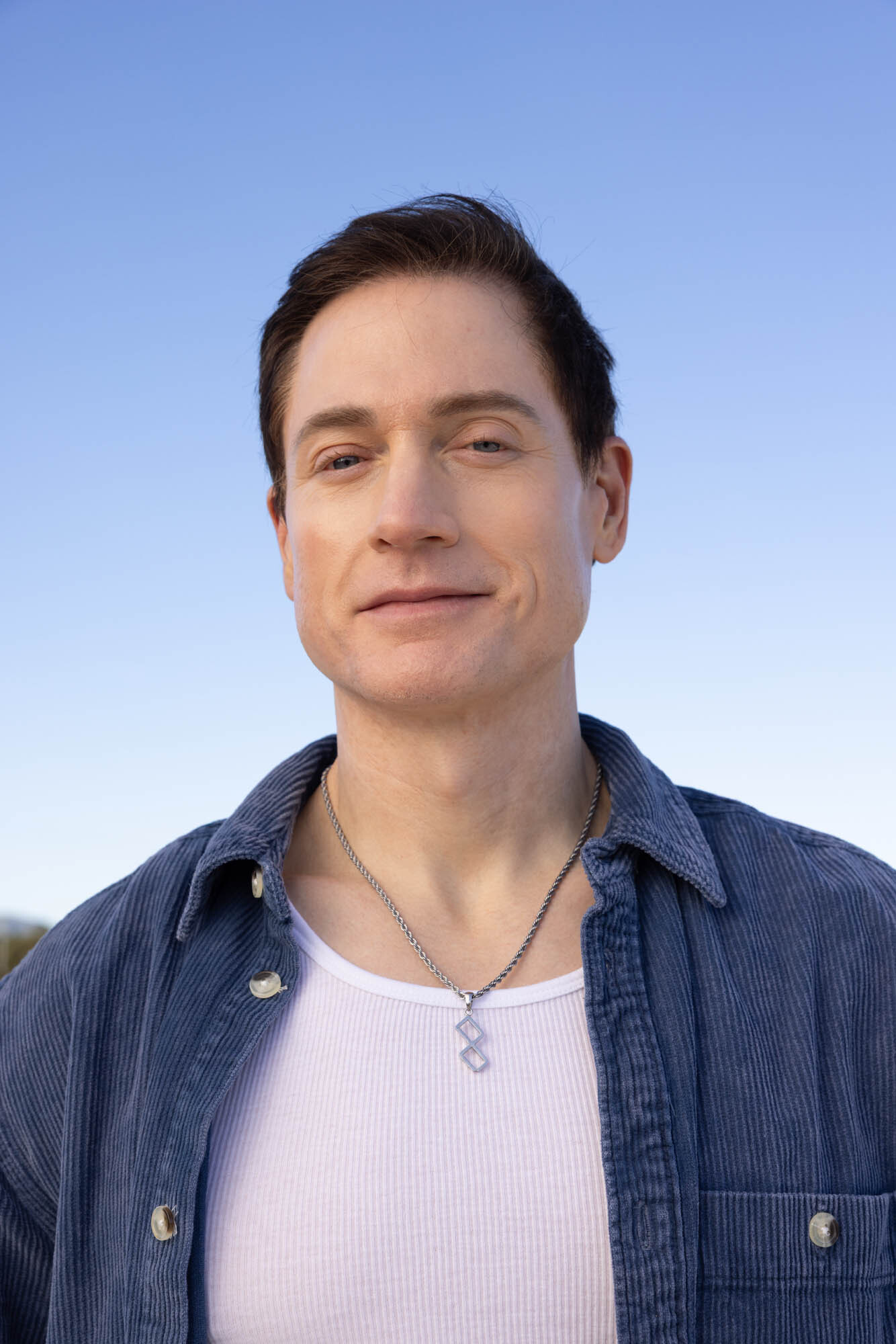
- Johnson in 2026
- Born: August 22, 1977 (age 49); Provo, Utah, U.S.
- Education: Brigham Young University (BA); University of Chicago (MBA)
- Occupations: Entrepreneur; business executive
- Title: Founder and CEO of Kernel, OS Fund and Braintree
- Partner: Kate Tolo (2023-present)
- Children: 3
- Website: bryanjohnson.com

Bryan Johnson (born August 22, 1977) is an American entrepreneur, venture capitalist, writer and author. He is the founder and former CEO of Kernel, a company creating devices that monitor and record brain activity, and OS Fund, a venture capital firm that invests in early-stage science and technology companies.

Johnson was also the founder, chairman and CEO of Braintree, a company specializing in mobile and web payment systems for e-commerce companies. Braintree acquired Venmo in 2012 for $26.2 million; the combined entity was acquired by PayPal for $800 million in 2013.

Johnson has received media attention for his anti-aging attempts, with a commercial company attached to the project called Blueprint. He refers to the philosophy as "don't die". In 2026 Johnson announced he was diagnosed with an incurable autoimmune disease.

== Early life and education ==
Johnson was born in Provo, Utah, to Richard Johnson and Ellen Huff and raised in neighboring Springville, as a middle child with a brother and a sister. After his parents divorced, Johnson lived with his mother and his stepfather, who owned a trucking company.

Johnson graduated with a Bachelor of Arts in international studies from Brigham Young University in 2003 and a Master of Business Administration from the University of Chicago Booth School of Business in 2007.

== Career ==
=== Early ventures ===
Johnson launched three startups between 1999 and 2003. The first one sold cell phones and helped pay his way through Brigham Young University. Johnson hired other university students to sell service plans and cell phones; Johnson earned about a $300 commission on each sale.

He also started two other businesses. Inquist, a VoIP company Johnson co-founded with three other partners, combined features of Vonage and Skype. It ended operations in 2001. After that, he joined his brother and another partner on a $70 million real estate project in 2001. The project did not meet its sales goals.

=== Braintree ===
Johnson founded Braintree in 2007. The company was 47th on Inc. magazine's 2011 list of the 500 fastest-growing companies and 415th in 2012. That year, Braintree purchased Venmo, an app that allows users to send and receive money from each other electronically, for $26.2 million.

By September 2013 the company announced it was processing $12 billion in payments annually, with $4 billion on mobile. Shortly afterward, on September 26, 2013, the company was acquired by PayPal, then part of eBay, for $800 million. Time Magazine published that Johnson walked away from the sale of Braintree Venmo with more than $300 million.

=== OS Fund ===
In October 2014, Johnson announced the launch of the OS Fund, which invests in early-stage science and technology companies and which he backed with $100 million of his personal capital.

=== Kernel ===
Johnson founded Kernel in 2016, investing $100 million of his own money to launch the company, "with the sole purpose of building hardware and software to augment human intelligence." The company later shifted its focus to building hardware that measures electrical and hemodynamic signals produced by the brain.

Documents released by the United States Department of Justice in February 2026 show that Johnson had email correspondence and meetings with Jeffrey Epstein in 2017 about Kernel. After the documents were released and reported by various outlets, Johnson confirmed that the meeting took place and stated that he cut off contact following one video conference. Johnson was introduced to Epstein by Alex Klokus.

In 2020, Kernel demonstrated a pair of helmet-like devices that measure electromagnetic activity from cortical sources, and cortical oxy-/deoxyhemoglobin concentration changes (a slow hemodynamic proxy for neural activity) using TD-fNIRS. Researchers working on Alzheimer's disease, aging, concussions, meditation states, and strokes could potentially use Kernel's new devices rather than the class of devices that currently exist. The company speculates the devices could be used to help paralyzed individuals communicate, or people with mental health challenges access new therapies.

=== Blueprint ===
On October 13, 2021, Johnson announced an anti-aging attempt called Project Blueprint, which subsequently became the basis for a commercial company headquartered in Los Angeles co-founded with Kate Tolo. Johnson has stated the aims of the company are to reduce the biological age of his organs to that of an 18-year-old and "make death an option." Blueprint sells consumer health products including supplements and foods derived from Johnson's personal optimization protocol. The protocol that Johnson follows as the test subject cost approximately $2 million a year in 2023, and was tracking over 100 health measurements. He has since reduced his daily supplement intake from 111 to 30 by March 2026.

In 2024, Blueprint Basics was launched as a subscription for consumers by Blueprint, costing $333 a month. In October, Blueprint raised $60 million in external funding from a group of investors that included Kim Kardashian and Cameron & Tyler Winklevoss. In July 2025, Gyre Renwick was appointed as the CEO of Blueprint, having formerly served as president of Modern Health. Johnson would continue to lead product and protocol development.

=== Use of confidentiality agreements ===
A New York Times investigation revealed that Johnson used confidentiality agreements to control his public image and that of his companies. Some of his workers have joined forces to challenge those agreements. Johnson defended his use of confidentiality agreements on social media, saying "I post nudes on social media. I track my nighttime erections. My team openly discusses my semen health... Rather than letting people walk in blind, we disclose this upfront, in writing, so there are no surprises."

== Anti-aging protocol ==
In 2019, Johnson stated he had for years maintained health-compromising habits, due to the demands of entrepreneurship and as a young father. He started improving his well-being through standard health interventions before shifting toward anti-aging experimentation in 2021.

In 2023, Johnson underwent a series of monthly 1-liter plasma transfusions over a six month period. One of these six transfusions was a tri-generational transfusion experiment, with Johnson's 17-year-old son serving as the donor for Johnson, then Johnson was himself donor for his father. He says he will not repeat the transfusions due to lack of benefits. The FDA has stated that transfusions such as the kind Johnson had are without benefit and may be harmful. Johnson follows a strict dietary and lifestyle regimen in pursuit of life extension.

Since 2023, Johnson has publicly shared his biomarker data and engaged in competitive biohacking against other people. The idea was recommended by Kate Tolo. In 2025, Johnson recorded a DunedinPACE speed of aging score at 0.503 per calendar year. DunedinPACE is a DNA methylation biomarker used to estimate the pace of biological aging.

His attempts have been met with criticism from some experts in fields related to aging. Moshe Szyf, a professor of pharmacology and therapeutics at McGill University, has expressed skepticism that science is yet capable of achieving the remarkable results that Johnson claims to be reaching. Andrew Steele, a longevity scientist and author, emphasizes that no amount of the practices that Johnson is doing can change his genes.

== Recognition ==
In 2016, Johnson received the University of Chicago Booth's Distinguished Alumni Award.

Johnson was featured in the 2020 documentary I Am Human about brain–machine interfaces, and is the subject of the 2025 Netflix documentary Don't Die: The Man Who Wants to Live Forever. An excerpt from the documentary played on a loop at the Wellcome Collection's 2026 exhibition "The Coming of Age", with Johnson describing his regimen of taking pills, eating vegetables while doing lunges, and going to bed at 8:30 pm without exceptions.

In 2025, he was invited to speak at the Bitcoin Conference stating that he desires to live until the year 2140, the last Bitcoin halving, when he would be 163.

He was invited to a Make America Healthy Again (MAHA) summit in November 2025, speaking at a panel on reverse-aging hosted by then U.S. Deputy Secretary of Health and Human Services Jim O'Neill. The summit was organized by Secretary Robert F. Kennedy Jr.

== Personal life ==
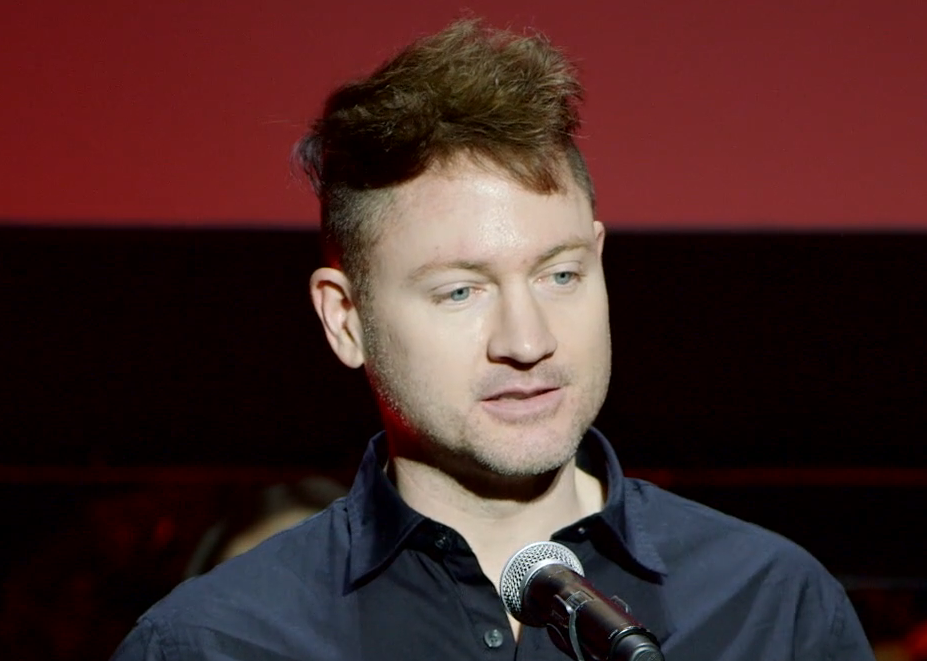
Johnson in 2017

Johnson was raised in the Church of Jesus Christ of Latter-day Saints, for whom he served a mission in Ecuador. He remained a member until he was 34.

He married and had three children. After that marriage ended he had a relationship with internet personality Taryn Southern. The two were engaged, but broke up while she had breast cancer, according to Southern. Following the breakup, Southern filed a civil lawsuit making various claims, including breach of contract and emotional distress. Because of a contract signed when she was employed by Johnson's company Kernel, the claims had to go through arbitration. The arbitrator dismissed her employment-related claims and ordered Southern to pay Johnson's legal fees. Johnson denied the allegations and addressed the case in a YouTube video released in December 2023. In December 2025, Johnson stated that he has been in a long-term relationship with Kate Tolo, a cofounder of his Blueprint venture.

Johnson follows an entirely plant-based diet aside from consuming collagen peptides; he has mentioned that he follows this diet for reasons unrelated to his Blueprint protocol.

During the 2026 Paris Fashion Week, Johnson walked on the runway in the Matières Fécales show.

In June 2026 he announced that he had been diagnosed with autoimmune gastritis and that he is not going to stop his anti-aging experimentation. He has rejected the possibility that his longevity regimen has caused this illness.

== Published works ==
- Code 7: Cracking the Code for an Epic Life. Candy Wrapper. 2017. ISBN 978-1-940556-01-7.
- Johnson contributed a chapter to the book Architects of Intelligence: The Truth About AI from the People Building It (2018) by the American futurist Martin Ford.
- The Proto Project: A Sci-Fi Adventure of the Mind. Candy Wrapper. 2019. ISBN 978-1-940556-07-9.
- Don't Die. Blueprint. 2023. ISBN 978-1-940556-16-1.
- We the People. Zero. 2023. ISBN 978-1-940556-20-8.

== See also ==
- Human enhancement
- N-of-1 trial
- Personal Science
- Quantified self
- Self-experimentation in medicine
- Seth Roberts
