= Personal science =

Science applied to one's own problems

Personal science is a term used by the late psychologist and scientist Seth Roberts, who defined it as: "using science to solve your own problems". Associated fields are self-experimentation and citizen science. The concept has been further developed within the Quantified Self community.

== History ==
The history of personal science is derived from several sources, one of which is the 1958 book Personal Knowledge: Towards A Post-Critical Philosophy by Michael Polanyi. His work especially highlighted the tacit and subjective dimensions of conventional scientific practices. Building on Polanyi's work, Martin and Brouwer's 1993 article "Exploring Personal Science" introduced the term personal science as an approach for characterizing scientific practice for young students. They emphasized that "science is not simply rational and objective but that the inquiring person is an integral part of the enquiry".

In 2016, a chapter examining the Quantified Self community from a sociology of knowledge perspective used the term and associated it with "an interest in collecting data about their own bodies or lives in order to obtain insights into their everyday health or performance". In 2017, the scientific journal Methods of Information in Medicine published a focus theme on single-subject (N-of-1) research design, which also included personal science. The editorial introducing the focus theme is titled "Single Subject (N-of-1) Research Design, Data Processing, and Personal Science" and is co-authored by Gary Wolf, who together with Kevin Kelly coined the term quantified self. In the editorial, personal science was described as "self-directed N-of-1 studies". In 2020, Wolf further developed the term together with Martijn de Groot in an article titled "A Conceptual Framework for Personal Science". They defined personal science as "the practice of using empirical methods to explore personal questions". In a 2021 scientific article building on the previous ones, personal science is defined as: "the practice of exploring personally consequential questions by conducting self-directed N-of-1 studies using a structured empirical approach".

In 2024, a MediaWiki-based knowledge management system that had been co-designed by and for personal science practitioners was published by a team of researchers.

== See also ==
- eHealth
- Human enhancement
