= Sober Grid =

Substance abuser social networking app

Sober Grid, Inc.
- Company type: Private
- Founded: April 29, 2015; 11 years ago
- Headquarters: Boston, Massachusetts, US
- Area served: United States; Worldwide
- Founder: Beau Mann^{†}
- Key people: Beau Mann (CEO)
- Industry: Mobile Applications, eHealth
- Website: www.sobergridapp.com
- Users: 350,000+

Sober Grid was a digital health company and mobile application designed to provide peer support and resources for individuals in recovery from substance use disorders. Founded in 2015 by Beau Mann, the app connected users based on geolocation and offered features such as a newsfeed, chat, and a “Burning Desire” button for urgent support needs.

The mobile user base was the largest social mobile networking application for people with substance abuse issues on a mobile platform. The application worked by connecting sober people and those looking to get sober based on their relative distance. Sober Grid creator Beau Mann had the idea to create Sober Grid while attending the Sundance Film Festival. He served as president and CEO.

In June 2018 Sober Grid purchased Ascent, an evidence-based peer recovery coaching service in Ohio. Through this acquisition, Sober Grid is now able to provide HIPAA compliant 24/7 certified peer coaching support through their application.

The company received funding from the National Science Foundation and the National Institutes of Health. The company was partnered with researchers from the University of Pennsylvania Perelman School of Medicine and Harvard Medical School where it worked on its Artificial Intelligence capabilities to predict relapses and hopefully later intervene. The company had appeared on Fox, CNBC, Entrepreneur, NY Metro, New York Times, The Boston Globe, Forbes, and many other media outlets.

== Features ==
The design of Sober Grid had two main features: the newsfeed and the grid. The newsfeed contained a time-oriented list of posts from Sober Grid users. The grid displayed users based on their proximity. On the newsfeed, users had the option to turn on the “burning desire” feature.

== Competitors ==
Sober Grid was a leader in the digital health marketplace for mental health and Substance Use Disorder. Sober Grid competed with a rival digital health therapy, reSET-O, made for Opioid Use Disorder by Pear Therapeutics. Click Therapeutics and MAP Health Management were also competitors to Sober Grid.

An additional feature, added in September 2018 allowed users to pay for certified peer coaching.

== Founder's death ==
Beau Mann, founder and CEO, went missing in November 2021. His remains were discovered in May 2023 in Santa Monica, California, and identified through dental records. His death was widely mourned in the recovery community, and marked a turning point for the company’s operations.

== Shutdown ==
As of 2025, Sober Grid is no longer operational and is listed as a deadpooled company on Tracxn. The app was unpublished from the Apple App Store in November 2023, and users began reporting service outages and login issues in early 2025. No formal public statement was issued by the company regarding its closure.
