= Self-experimentation =

Research experiment conducted on oneself

Self-experimentation refers to single-subject research in which the experimenter conducts the experiment on themself. Usually, this means that a single person is the designer, operator, subject, analyst, and user or reporter of the experiment. Self-experimentation is an example of citizen science since it can be done by patients or people interested in their own health and well-being, as both research subjects and self-experimenters. It is also referred to as personal science or N-of-1 research.

== Biology and medicine ==
Human scientific self-experimentation principally (though not necessarily) falls into the fields of medicine and psychology. Self-experimentation has a long and well-documented history in medicine which continues to the present day.

For example, after failed attempts to infect piglets in 1984, Barry Marshall drank a petri dish of Helicobacter pylori from a patient, and soon developed gastritis, achlorhydria, stomach discomfort, nausea, vomiting, and halitosis. The results were published in 1985 in the Medical Journal of Australia, and is among the most cited articles from the journal. He was awarded the Nobel Prize in Physiology or Medicine in 2005.

Evaluations have been presented in the context of clinical trials and program evaluations.

== Psychology ==
In psychology, the best-known self-experiments are the memory studies of Hermann Ebbinghaus, which established many basic characteristics of human memory through tedious experiments involving nonsense syllables.

== Chemistry ==
Several popular and well-known sweeteners were discovered by deliberate or sometimes accidental tasting of reaction products. Saccharin was synthetized in 1879 in the chemistry labs of Ira Remsen at Johns Hopkins by a student scientist, Constantin Fahlberg, who noticed "curious sweet taste on his fingers while eating his dinner, [and] realized that it came from something he had spilled on his hand during the day". Fahlberg subsequently identified the active compound, ortho-benzoic sulfimide, and named it saccharin. Cyclamate was discovered when a chemistry research student noticed a sweet taste on his cigarette that he had set down on his bench. Acesulfame was discovered when a laboratory worker licked his finger. Aspartame was also discovered accidentally when chemist James Schlatter spilled a solution of it on his hands, then later licked one of his fingers to pick up a piece of paper. Sucralose was discovered by a foreign student, mishearing instructions of his supervisor, Prof. L. Hough, to "test" the compounds as to "taste" them.

Leo Sternbach, the inventor of Librium and Valium, tested chemicals that he made on himself, saying in an interview, "I tried everything. Many drugs. Once, in the sixties, I was sent home for two days. It was an extremely potent drug, not a Benzedrine. I slept for a long time. My wife was very worried".

Swiss chemist Albert Hofmann first discovered the psychedelic properties of LSD five years after its creation, when he accidentally absorbed a small amount of the drug through his fingertips. Days later, he intentionally self-experimented with it.

Hungarian chemist and psychiatrist Stephen Szára discovered the psychedelic effects of dimethyltryptamine (DMT) via self-experimentation in 1956. He described experiencing intense euphoria at the higher DMT doses due to his excitement about the discovery.

American chemist Alexander Shulgin synthesized hundreds of compounds in search of psychoactive drugs like psychedelics and entactogens, and evaluated them via careful self-experimentation together with his wife Ann Shulgin and a small research group of good friends.

A great deal of additional notable self-experimentation in the area of psychoactive drugs has also been reported.

== See also ==
- Human enhancement
- Participant observation
- Personal science
- Psychonautics
- Quantified self
- Seth Roberts
