= AI scribe =

Software tools for medical audio transcription

AI scribes (artificial intelligence scribes) in medicine (also called automated medical scribes, digital scribes, virtual scribes, ambient AI scribes, ambient voice technologies, AI documentation assistants, and digital/virtual/smart clinical assistants) are tools for transcribing and summarising patient consultations and other forms of medical notes. AI scribes based on large language models (LLMs) increased drastically in popularity in 2024. They can lead to faster documentation, reduced administrative burden, and an improved interaction between the patient and the clinician. However, there are concerns about accuracy, equity concerns, privacy and antitrust concerns. Accuracy concerns intensify in situations in which tools try to go beyond transcribing and summarizing, and are asked to format information by its meaning, since LLMs do not deal well with meaning (see weak artificial intelligence). Medics using these scribes are generally expected to understand the ethical and legal considerations, and supervise the outputs. Most providers have not published any safety or utility data in academic journals, and are not responsive to requests from medical researchers studying their products.

The privacy protections of automated medical scribes vary widely. While it is possible to do all the transcription and summarizing locally, with no connection to the internet, most closed-source providers require that data be sent to their own servers over the internet, processed there, and the results sent back (as with digital voice assistants). Some retailers say their tools use zero-knowledge encryption (meaning that the service provider can't access the data). Others explicitly say that they use patient data to train their AIs, or rent or resell it to third parties; the nature of privacy protections used in such situations is unclear, and they are likely not to be fully effective.

== Technology and market ==
The medical scribe market is highly competitive, with, as of 2024, over 50 products on the market. Many of these products are proprietary wrappers around the same LLM backends, including backends whose designers have warned they are not to be used for critical applications like medicine. Some vendors market scribes specialized to specific branches of medicine, though most target general practitioners. Increasingly, vendors market their products as more than scribes, claiming that they are intelligent assistants and co-pilots to doctors. These broader uses raise more accuracy concerns. Extracting information from the conversation to autopopulate a form, for instance, may be problematic, with symptoms incorrectly auto-labelled as "absent" even if they were repeatedly discussed. Models failed to extract many indirect descriptions of symptoms, like a patient saying they could only sleep for four hours (instead of using the word "insomnia").

LLMs are not trained to produce facts, but things which look like facts. The use of templates and rules can make them more reliable at extracting semantic information, but confabulations or hallucinations (convincing but wrong output) are an intrinsic part of the technology.

Scribes may operate on desktops, laptop, or mobile computers, under a variety of operating systems. These vary in their risks; for instance, mobiles can be lost. The underlying mobile or desktop operating systems are also part of the trusted computing base, and if they are not secure, the software relying on them cannot be secure either.

Some AI medical scribe platforms are designed to operate as cloud-based applications that generate structured clinical documentation from clinician–patient conversations. These systems may offer features such as real-time transcription, document generation, and integration with electronic health record (EHR) systems.

== Impact in healthcare ==
AI medical scribes have been shown to have multiple effects on healthcare practice.

AI scribes can alleviate healthcare professionals' documentation workload. By automating the transcription and summarization of consultations, AI scribes free up time that clinicians would otherwise spend on administrative tasks. Studies have shown that the average clinician spends a significant portion of their workday on documentation, leading to fatigue and diminishing patient interaction. Systematic reviews show that ambient AI scribes reduce the time clinicians spend on clinical documentation, although the quality and completeness of the generated drafts vary depending on the clinical setting and the specific software used.

Clinicians report feeling more present with their patients, as they are no longer distracted by the need to type or dictate notes during consultations. This shift allows for more meaningful conversations with patients, improving the quality of care provided.

The reduction in administrative burden contributes to lower levels of stress and burnout, a concern that has been exacerbated in healthcare settings in recent years. The ability to offload routine documentation tasks also allows clinicians to focus on more meaningful parts of their work can lead to improved overall job satisfaction.

=== Confabulation, omissions, and other errors ===
Like other LLMs, medical-scribe LLMs are prone to hallucinations, where they make up content based on statistical associations between their training data and the transcription audio. LLMs do not distinguish between trying to transcribe the audio and guessing what words will come next, but perform both processes mixed together. They are especially likely to take short silences or non-speech noises and invent some sort of speech to transcribe them as.

LLM medical scribes have been known to confabulate racist and otherwise prejudiced content; this is partly because the training datasets of many LLMs contain pseudoscientific texts about medical racism. They may misgender patients. A survey found that most doctors preferred, in principle, that scribes be trained on data reviewed by medical subject experts. Relevant, accurate training data increases the probability of an accurate transcription, but does not guarantee accuracy. Software trained on thousands of real clinical conversations generated transcripts with lower word error rates. Software trained on manually-transcribed training data did better than software trained with automatically transcribed training data such as YouTube captions.

Autoscribes omit parts of the conversation classes as irrelevant. The may wrongly classify pertinent information as irrelevant and omit it. They may also confuse historic and current symptoms, or otherwise misclassify information. They may also simply wrongly transcribe the speech, writing something incorrect instead. If clinicians do not carefully check the recording, such mistakes could make their way into their medical records and cause patient harms.

== Privacy ==
Some providers unclear about what happens to user data. Some may sell data to third parties. Some explicitly send user data to for-profit tech companies for secondary purposes, which may not be specified. Some require users to sign consents to such reuse of their data. Some ingest user data to train the software, promising to anonymize it; however, deanonymization may be possible (that is, it may become obvious who the patient is). It is intrinsically impossible to prevent an LLM from correlating its inputs; they work by finding similar patterns across very large data sets. Some information on the patient will be known from other sources (for instance, information that they were injured in an incident on a certain day might be available from the news media; information that they attended specific appointment locations at specific times is probably available to their cellphone provider/apps/data brokers; information about when they had a baby is probably implied by their online shopping records; and they might mention lifestyle changes to their doctor and on a forum or blog). The software may correlate such information with the "anonymized" clinical consultation record, and, asked about the named patient, provide information which they only told their doctor privately. Because a patient's record is all about the same patient, it is all unavoidably linked; in very many cases, medical histories are intrinsically identifiable. Depending on how common a condition and what other data is available, K-anonymity may be useless. Differential privacy could theoretically preserve privacy.

Data broker companies like Google, Amazon, Apple and Microsoft have produced or bought up medical scribes, some of which use user data for secondary purposes, which has led to antitrust concerns. Transfer of patient records for AI training has, in the past, prompted legal action.

Open-source programs typically do all the transcription locally, on the doctor's own computer. Open-source software is widely used in healthcare, with some national public healthcare bodies holding hack days.

=== Data resale and commercialization ===
Several AI medical scribe providers include terms in their service agreements that allow the reuse, sale, or commercialization of de-identified or user-submitted data. Although such data are generally described as anonymized or aggregated, these practices have raised ethical concerns among clinicians and privacy advocates regarding secondary uses of medical information beyond clinical documentation.

=== Encryption ===
Multifactor authentication for access to the data is expected practice.

Typically, Diffie–Hellman key exchange is used for encryption; this is the standard method commonly used for things like online banking. This encryption is expensive but not impossible to break; it is not generally considered safe against eavesdroppers with the resources of a nation-state.

If content is encrypted between the client and the service provider's remote server (transport cryptography), then the server has an unencrypted copy. This is necessary if the data is used by the service provider (for instance, to train the software). Zero-knowledge encryption implies that the only unencrypted copy is at the client, and the server cannot decrypt the data any more easily than a monster-in-the-middle attacker.

== Patient consent ==
Professional organizations generally require that scribes be used only with patient consent; some bodies may require written consent. Medics must also abide by local surveillance laws, which may criminalize recording private conversations without consent. Full information on how data is encrypted, transmitted, stored, and destroyed should be provided. In some jurisdictions, it is illegal to transmit the data to any country without equivalent privacy laws, or process or store the data there; vendors who cannot guarantee that their products won't illegally send data abroad cannot be legally used.

Some vendors collect data for reuse or resale. Medical professionals are generally considered to have a duty to review the terms and conditions of the user agreement and identify such data reuse. General practices are generally required to provide information on secondary uses to patients, allow them to opt out of secondary uses, and obtain consent for each specific secondary use. Data must only be used for agreed-upon purposes.

== Pricing ==
With the exception of fully open-source programs, which are free, medical scribe computer programs are rented rather than sold ("software as a service"). As of 2024, monthly fees vary from mid-two figures to four figures, in US dollars. Some companies run on a freemium model, where a certain number of transcriptions per month are free.

== See also ==
- Medical scribe
- AI in Healthcare
