= OS Fund =

American venture-capital fund

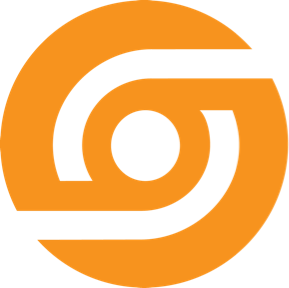
- Company type: Private
- Founded: 2014; 12 years ago
- Founder: Bryan Johnson, Jeff Klunzinger
- Headquarters: Chicago, Illinois, U.S.
- Products: Venture capital
- Website: osfund.co

OS Fund is an American venture capital fund that invests in early-stage science and technology companies.

== History ==
Bryan Johnson created OS Fund in October 2014, a year after selling Braintree to PayPal for $800 million. He devoted $100 million from the sale to establishing the fund. Johnson and Jeff Klunzinger serve as the fund's general partners.

Johnson has said he launched the fund in response to a pullback in federal support of research and development, and because of a general reluctance by more traditional venture capital firms to make science-related investments.

The fund draws its name from the acronym for operating system (OS), the software that underlies the basic functions of computers and provides a foundation for other applications. OS Fund focuses on investment in technologies and platforms in genomics, synthetic biology, computationally derived therapeutics, advanced materials, and diagnostics.

In September 2015, OS Fund published the methodology it uses to evaluate investments in the field of synthetic biology. In order to promote the brand, Johnson said the fund publicly released the "playbook" on its website to encourage others to invest in emerging sciences.

== Investments ==
OS Fund focuses on early-stage, computationally driven companies that utilize artificial intelligence and machine learning to develop platform technologies in genomics, synthetic biology, computationally derived therapeutics, advanced materials, and diagnostics.

Notable OS Fund investments include the following:

- Ginkgo Bioworks, a Boston-based biotechnology company that uses genetic engineering to produce bacteria with industrial applications; market cap as of June 2025 $0.5 billion.
- Atomwise, a San Francisco-based developer of an AI-powered drug discovery platform.
- twoXAR, now rebranded as Aria Pharmaceuticals an AI-driven drug discovery platform.
- Catalog, a Boston company focused on harnessing DNA to store data. The company showed it could store 14 gigabytes of data from Wikipedia.org in DNA molecules, and encode a 240 pages book using 500,000 unique DNA molecules, representing 481,280 bytes of data.
- Matternet, the builder and operator of drone logistics networks to transport goods on demand. In 2019, they partnered with UPS to transport medical samples across hospital systems as well as UPS and CVS Pharmacy to make at-home prescription deliveries.
