= PhysAssist Scribes =

US medical scribe company

- Type: Private
- Industry: Healthcare
- Founded: Fort Worth, Texas 1995
- Founder: John Geesbreght, MD
- Headquarters: Fort Worth, Texas, United States
- Area served: United States
- Key people: Alex Geesbreght CEO
- Services: Medical scribe
- Revenue: ▲$29 million (2014)
- Number of employees: 172 (2014)
- Website: iamscribe.com

PhysAssist Scribes is a provider of medical scribes to hospitals and medical practices. The company was founded in 1995 in Fort Worth, Texas by Dr. John Geesbreght, an emergency department physician and Dr. Elliott Trotter, also an emergency department physician, who began a model program at Harris Methodist Hospital. Dr. Geesbreght, with approval from Texas Christian University (TCU) administration, recruited four pre-med TCU students to establish what is now PhysAssist Scribes, Inc.

PhysAssist Scribes is the oldest medical scribe company in the United States.

Medical scribes work side-by-side with emergency department physicians throughout their shift and document the entire patient encounter in real-time. Scribes document the patient encounter into an electronic medical record (EMR) so the doctor can spend his or her time caring for the patient, improving the workflow of busy emergency departments and clinics, increasing patient throughput and driving efficiency and productivity for physician groups and hospitals. An estimated 22 companies provide scribe services across the United States.

In 2008, PhysAssist Scribes employed two corporate employees and 35 scribes, which increased to 2,500 professionals in 30 states by 2015. The company now has 172 employees, 3,500 scribes in 36 states. In 2014, Inc. magazine named PhysAssist Scribes one of the Top 5000 Fastest-Growing Private Companies in the country, with reported revenue of $29.3 million in 2013.

In 2008, PhysAssist Scribes created I AM SCRIBE University, in Fort Worth, Texas to train scribes on medical terminology, EHR documentation, privacy laws, compliance and professional ethics.

In May 2014, Ernst & Young announced that PhysAssist Scribes’ President and CEO Alex Geesbreght was a finalist for the 2014 Ernst & Young Entrepreneur of the Year Award for his company’s founding role in the medical scribe services industry.
