= Eli Herring =

American football player (born 1969)

No. 76
- Position: Offensive tackle

Personal information
- Born: 1969 (age 56–57)

Career information
- High school: Springville High School (UT)
- College: BYU (1987, 1991–1994)

Eli Herring (born 1969) is an American college athlete and high school sports coach.

He played football for Brigham Young University (BYU) as an offensive tackle. Though Herring was widely expected to turn professional after college, he gained notoriety for declining to play in the National Football League (NFL) for religious reasons involving working on the Sundays and made his intention clear to all NFL teams prior to the 1995 NFL draft. Nonetheless, the devout member of the Church of Jesus Christ of Latter-day Saints (LDS Church) was drafted in the 6th round by the Oakland Raiders. He is one of few people to get drafted in the NFL after declaring an intention never to play.

Herring is married with seven children and works as a math teacher and assistant football coach at Mountain View High School in Orem, Utah.

== High school ==
During his years at Springville High School, Herring participated and lettered in football, basketball, wrestling and track. He earned All-Region and All-State honors in football and wrestling, while also setting two state records in track and becoming the Utah state champion in the shot put and discus. He was the captain of the football team, and was a member of the 1985 team that won the state championship. He was recruited to play football by BYU, the University of Utah, Utah State University, Stanford University, and the University of Washington. In 1987, he chose BYU because it was the only school that did not withdraw a scholarship offer when he announced his plans to serve an LDS Church mission for two years aged about 19 to 21.

== LDS Church mission ==
Following his freshman year at BYU, Herring served an LDS Church mission in Salta, Argentina from 1988 to 1990. While he was there, he read about Erroll Bennett, a professional soccer player in Tahiti, who withdrew from his team after joining the LDS Church and deciding not to play on Sundays. Herring was impressed by Bennett's commitment to his religious principles.

Herring's views on money were also affected by his time in Argentina. When he arrived there, one U.S. dollar was worth 15 Argentine australs. By the time he departed Argentita, a dollar was worth about 10,000 australs. This period of hyper-inflation led to his belief money was not necessarily reliable and that he should not make decisions solely based on financial factors.

== College ==
Unlike some returned missionaries who lose their athletic edge when coming back to college sports, Herring came back from his two-year mission stronger, faster, more coordinated, and even more ready to play football. By his senior season, he stood 6 feet 8 and weighed 330 pounds. Herring played offensive tackle at BYU during the 1987 and 1991-94 seasons, earning honorable mention All-WAC in 1993 and second team All-WAC honors in 1994. He was selected to play in the Hula Bowl during his senior season. He was also a member of the BYU track team.

In addition to football, Herring got married during his time at BYU, and he earned a bachelor's degree in mathematics.

== Decision not to play professional football ==
Projected as an NFL first to third round draft choice, Herring made the decision to forgo a professional career so he wouldn't have to work on Sundays. He wrote letters to each NFL team to inform them of this decision. He was still drafted in the sixth round of the 1995 NFL draft by the Oakland Raiders, and Raider senior assistant Bruce Allen flew to Provo and offered Herring a three-year, $1.5 million contract. Herring rejected Allen's offer, and also politely declined after Raiders assistant coach Fred Whittingham, also LDS, discussed the matter with him.

His starting salary as a teacher at Mountain View High School was around $22,000 a year, with an additional smaller stipend from football coaching.

Herring later commented he held no negative feelings towards other LDS professional athletes like Steve Young, Todd Christensen or Shawn Bradley who elected to work on Sundays, saying the decision was a personal matter and adding church texts on the subject could potentially be interpreted in various ways.

== Personal ==
Herring met his wife, Jennifer Anderson, at church while at BYU, and they married in July 1992. They have seven children. He is a school teacher and assistant football coach at Mountain View High School in Orem, Utah. Herring's younger brother, Isaac, also played on BYU's offensive line from 1999 to 2002.

Starting in January 2013, Herring served in the LDS Church as a counselor to the president of the Orem Utah Sharon Park Stake. He previously served as a bishop for seven years.
