= EHealth =

Healthcare services enhanced by digital technologies, workflows

eHealth describes healthcare services which are supported by digital processes, communication or technology such as electronic prescribing, Telehealth, or Electronic Health Records (EHRs). The term "eHealth" originated in the 1990s, initially conceived as "Internet medicine" or internet intervention, but has since evolved to have a broader range of technologies and innovations aimed at enhancing healthcare delivery and accessibility. According to the World Health Organization (WHO), eHealth encompasses not only internet-based healthcare services but also modern advancements such as artificial intelligence, mHealth (mobile health), and telehealth, which collectively aim to improve accessibility and efficiency in healthcare delivery. Usage of the term varies widely. A study in 2005 found 51 unique definitions of eHealth, reflecting its diverse applications and interpretations. While some argue that it is interchangeable with health informatics as a broad term covering electronic/digital processes in health, others use it in the narrower sense of healthcare practice specifically facilitated by the Internet. It also includes health applications and links on mobile phones, referred to as mHealth or m-Health. Key components of eHealth include electronic health records (EHRs), telemedicine, health information exchange, mobile health applications, wearable devices, and online health information. For example, diabetes monitoring apps allow patients to track health metrics in real time, bridging the gap between home and clinical care. These technologies enable healthcare providers, patients, and other stakeholders to access, manage, and exchange health information more effectively, leading to improved communication, decision-making, and overall healthcare outcomes.

== Types ==
The term can encompass a range of services or systems that are at the edge of medicine/healthcare and information technology, including:

- Electronic health record: enabling the communication of patient data between different healthcare professionals (GPs, specialists etc.);
- Computerized physician order entry: a means of requesting diagnostic tests and treatments electronically and receiving the results
- ePrescribing: access to prescribing options, printing prescriptions to patients and sometimes electronic transmission of prescriptions from doctors to pharmacists
- Clinical decision support system: providing information electronically about protocols and standards for healthcare professionals to use in diagnosing and treating patients
- Automated clinical documentation: tools that generate preliminary drafts of clinical notes from clinician–patient encounters for later review and editing by healthcare professionals; examples include commercial platforms such as Twofold Health, which operate alongside electronic health record systems.
- Telemedicine: physical and psychological diagnosis and treatments at a distance, including telemonitoring of patients functions and videoconferencing;
- Telerehabilitation: providing rehabilitation services over a distance through telecommunications.
- Telesurgery: use robots and wireless communication to perform surgery remotely.
- Teledentistry: exchange clinical information and images over a distance.
- Consumer health informatics: use of electronic resources on medical topics by healthy individuals or patients;
- Health knowledge management: e.g. in an overview of latest medical journals, best practice guidelines or epidemiological tracking (examples include physician resources such as Medscape and MDLinx);
- Virtual healthcare teams: consisting of healthcare professionals who collaborate and share information on patients through digital equipment (for transmural care)
- mHealth or m-Health: includes the use of mobile devices in collecting aggregate and patient-level health data, providing healthcare information to practitioners, researchers, and patients, real-time monitoring of patient vitals, and direct provision of care (via mobile telemedicine);
- Medical research using grids: powerful computing and data management capabilities to handle large amounts of heterogeneous data.
- Health informatics / healthcare information systems: also often refer to software solutions for appointment scheduling, patient data management, work schedule management and other administrative tasks surrounding health. There can be integrated data collection platforms for devices and standards and require extended research.
- Internet Based Sources for Public Health Surveillance (Infoveillance).

== Contested Definition ==
Several authors have noted the variable usage in the term; from being specific to the use of the Internet in healthcare to being generally around any use of computers in healthcare. Various authors have considered the evolution of the term and its usage and how this maps to changes in health informatics and healthcare generally. The name eHealth has to some extent been superseded by the use of Digital health, which covers technology in healthcare more generally, but which is also seen as covering Internet related technologies. Various authors have considered the evolution of the term and its usage and how this maps to changes in health informatics and healthcare generally. Oh et al., in a 2005 systematic review of the term's usage, offered the definition of eHealth as a set of technological themes in health today, more specifically based on commerce, activities, stakeholders, outcomes, locations, or perspectives. One thing that all sources seem to agree on is that e-health initiatives do not originate with the patient, though the patient may be a member of a patient organization that seeks to do this, as in the e-Patient movement.

== eHealth literacy ==
eHealth literacy is defined as "the ability to seek, find, understand and appraise health information from electronic sources and apply the knowledge gained to addressing or solving a health problem." This concept encompasses six types of literacy: traditional (literacy and numeracy), information, media, health, computer, and scientific. Of these, media and computer literacies are unique to the Internet context. eHealth media literacy includes awareness of media bias, the ability to discern both explicit and implicit meanings from media messages, and the capability to derive accurate information from digital content.

While eHealth literacy involves the ability to use technology, it is extremely important to have the skills to critically evaluate online health information. This makes media literacy a critical part of successfully using eHealth. Having the composite skills of eHealth literacy allows health consumers to achieve positive outcomes from using the Internet for health purposes. eHealth literacy has the potential to both protect consumers from harm and empower them to fully participate in informed health-related decision making. People with high levels of eHealth literacy are also more aware of the risk of encountering unreliable information on the Internet On the other hand, the extension of digital resources to the health domain in the form of eHealth literacy can also create new gaps between health consumers. eHealth literacy hinges not on the mere access to technology, but rather on the skill to apply the accessed knowledge. The efficiency of eHealth also heavily relies on the efficiency and ease of use regarding technology being used by the patient.

The population of elderly people surpassed the number of children for the first time in history in 2018. A more multi-faceted approach is necessary for this age group, because they are more susceptible to chronic disease, contraindications of medication, and other age-related setbacks like forgetfulness. Ehealth offers services that can be very helpful for all of these scenarios, making an elderly patient's quality of life substantially better with proper use.

== Data exchange ==
One of the factors hindering the widespread acceptance of e-health tools is the concern about privacy, particularly regarding EPRs (Electronic patient record). This main concern has to do with the confidentiality of the data, as well as non-confidential data that may be vulnerable to unauthorized access. Each medical practice has its own jargon and diagnostic tools, so to standardize the exchange of information, various coding schemes may be used in combination with international medical standards. Systems that deal with these transfers are often referred to as Health Information Exchange (HIE). Of the forms of e-health already mentioned, there are roughly two types; front-end data exchange and back-end exchange.

Front-end exchange typically involves the patient, while back-end exchange does not. A common example of a rather simple front-end exchange is a patient sending a photo taken by mobile phone of a healing wound and sending it via email to the family doctor for control. Such an action may avoid the cost of an expensive visit to the hospital.

A common example of a back-end exchange is when a patient on vacation visits a doctor who then may request access to the patient's health records, such as medicine prescriptions, x-ray photographs, or blood test results. Such an action may reveal allergies or other prior conditions that are relevant to the visit.

=== Thesaurus ===
Successful e-health initiatives such as e-Diabetes have shown that for data exchange to be facilitated either at the front-end or the back-end, a common thesaurus is needed for terms of reference. Various medical practices in chronic patient care (such as for diabetic patients) already have a well defined set of terms and actions, which makes standard communication exchange easier, whether the exchange is initiated by the patient or the caregiver.

In general, explanatory diagnostic information (such as the standard ICD-10) may be exchanged insecurely, and private information (such as personal information from the patient) must be secured. E-health manages both flows of information, while ensuring the quality of the data exchange.

== Early adopters ==
Patients living with long term conditions (also called chronic conditions) over time often acquire a high level of knowledge about the processes involved in their own care, and often develop a routine in coping with their condition. For these types of routine patients, front-end e-health solutions tend to be relatively easy to implement.

== E-mental health ==
E-mental health is frequently used to refer to internet based interventions and support for mental health conditions. However, it can also refer to the use of information and communication technologies that also includes the use of social media, landline and mobile phones. These services can range from providing information to offering peer support, computer-based programs, virtual applications, games, and real-time interaction with trained clinicians. Additionally, services can be delivered through telephones and interactive voice response (IVR).

Mental disorders, including alcohol and drug use disorders, mood disorders such as depression, dementia, schizophrenia, and anxiety disorders can all be addressed through e-mental health services. The majority of e-mental health interventions have focused on the treatment of depression and anxiety. There are also E-mental health programs available for other interventions such as smoking cessation, gambling, and post-disaster mental health.

=== Advantages and disadvantages ===
E-mental health has a number of advantages such as being low cost, easily accessible and providing anonymity to users. However, there are also a number of disadvantages such as concerns regarding treatment credibility, user privacy and confidentiality. Online security involves the implementation of appropriate safeguards to protect user privacy and confidentiality. This includes appropriate collection and handling of user data, the protection of data from unauthorized access and modification and the safe storage of data. Technical difficulties are another potential disadvantage. With almost all forms of technology, there will be unintended difficulties or malfunctions, which doesn't exclude tablets, computers, and wireless medical devices. Ehealth is also very dependent on the patient having functional Wi-Fi, which can be an issue that cannot be fixed without an expert.

E-mental health has been gaining momentum in academic research as well as practical arenas in a wide variety of disciplines such as psychology, clinical social work, family and marriage therapy, and mental health counseling. Testifying to this momentum, the E-Mental Health movement has its own international organization, the International Society for Mental Health Online. However, e-Mental health implementation into clinical practice and healthcare systems remains limited and fragmented.

=== Programs ===
There are at least five programs currently available to treat anxiety and depression. Several programs have been identified by the UK National Institute for Health and Care Excellence as cost effective for use in primary care. These include Fearfighter, a text based cognitive behavioral therapy program to treat people with phobias, and Beating the Blues, an interactive text, cartoon and video CBT program for anxiety and depression. Two programs have been supported for use in primary care by the Australian Government. The first is Anxiety Online, a text based program for the anxiety, depressive and eating disorders, and the second is THIS WAY UP, a set of interactive text, cartoon and video programs for the anxiety and depressive disorders. Another is iFightDepression a multilingual, free to use, web-based tool for self-management of less severe forms of depression, for use under guidance of a GP or psychotherapist.

There are a number of online programs relating to smoking cessation. QuitCoach is a personalised quit plan based on the users response to questions regarding giving up smoking and tailored individually each time the user logs into the site. Freedom From Smoking takes users through lessons that are grouped into modules that provide information and assignments to complete. The modules guide participants through steps such as preparing to quit smoking, stopping smoking and preventing relapse.

Other internet programs have been developed specifically as part of research into treatment for specific disorders. For example, an online self-directed therapy for problem gambling was developed to specifically test this as a method of treatment. All participants were given access to a website. The treatment group was provided with behavioural and cognitive strategies to reduce or quit gambling. This was presented in the form of a workbook which encouraged participants to self-monitor their gambling by maintaining an online log of gambling and gambling urges. Participants could also use a smartphone application to collect self-monitoring information. Finally participants could also choose to receive motivational email or text reminders of their progress and goals.

An internet based intervention was also developed for use after Hurricane Ike in 2009. During this study, 1,249 disaster-affected adults were randomly recruited to take part in the intervention. Participants were given a structured interview then invited to access the web intervention using a unique password. Access to the website was provided for a four-month period. As participants accessed the site they were randomly assigned to either the intervention. those assigned to the intervention were provided with modules consisting of information regarding effective coping strategies to manage mental health and health risk behaviour.

eHealth programs have been found to be effective in treating borderline personality disorder (BPD).

== Cybermedicine ==
Cybermedicine is the use of the Internet to deliver medical services, such as medical consultations and drug prescriptions. It is the successor to telemedicine, wherein doctors would consult and treat patients remotely via telephone or fax.

Cybermedicine is already being used in small projects where images are transmitted from a primary care setting to a medical specialist, who comments on the case and suggests which intervention might benefit the patient. A field that lends itself to this approach is dermatology, where images of an eruption are communicated to a hospital specialist who determines if referral is necessary.

A Cyber Doctor, known in the UK as a Cyber Physician, is a medical professional who does consultation via the internet, treating virtual patients, who may never meet face to face. This is a new area of medicine which has been utilized by the armed forces and teaching hospitals offering online consultation to patients before making their decision to travel for unique medical treatment only offered at a particular medical facility.

== Self-monitoring healthcare devices ==
Self-monitoring is the use of sensors or tools which are readily available to the general public to track and record personal data. The sensors are usually wearable devices and the tools are digitally available through mobile device applications. Self-monitoring devices were created for the purpose of allowing personal data to be instantly available to the individual to be analyzed. As of now, fitness and health monitoring are the most popular applications for self-monitoring devices. The biggest benefit to self-monitoring devices is the elimination of the necessity for third party hospitals to run tests, which are both expensive and lengthy. These devices are an important advancement in the field of personal health management. Self-monitoring devices, like fitness trackers, have also been shown to help manage chronic diseases, providing users with real-time data that supports ongoing care and better disease management.

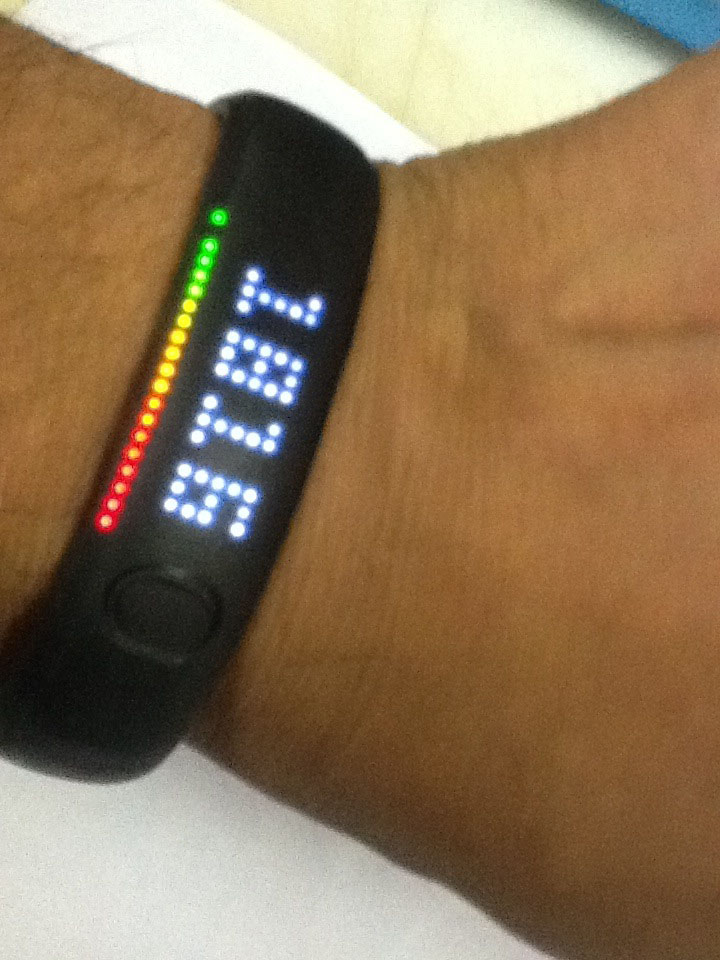
Nike FuelBand

Self-monitoring healthcare devices exist in many forms. An example is the Nike+ FuelBand, which is a modified version of the original pedometer. This device is wearable on the wrist and allows one to set a personal goal for a daily energy burn. It records the calories burned and the number of steps taken for each day while simultaneously functioning as a watch. To add to the ease of the user interface, it includes both numeric and visual indicators of whether or not the individual has achieved his or her daily goal. Finally, it is also synced to an iPhone app which allows for tracking and sharing of personal record and achievements.

Other monitoring devices have more medical relevance. A well-known device of this type is the blood glucose monitor. The use of this device is restricted to diabetic patients and allows users to measure the blood glucose levels in their body. It is extremely quantitative and the results are available instantaneously. However, this device is not as independent of a self-monitoring device as the Nike+ Fuelband because it requires some patient education before use. One needs to be able to make connections between the levels of glucose and the effect of diet and exercise. In addition, the users must also understand how the treatment should be adjusted based on the results. In other words, the results are not just static measurements.

The demand for self-monitoring health devices is skyrocketing, as wireless health technologies have become especially popular in the last few years. In fact, it is expected that by 2016, self-monitoring health devices will account for 80% of wireless medical devices. The key selling point for these devices is the mobility of information for consumers. The accessibility of mobile devices such as smartphones and tablets has increased significantly within the past decade. This has made it easier for users to access real-time information in a number of peripheral devices.

There are still many future improvements for self-monitoring healthcare devices. Although most of these wearable devices have been excellent at providing direct data to the individual user, the biggest task which remains at hand is how to effectively use this data. Although the blood glucose monitor allows the user to take action based on the results, measurements such as the pulse rate, EKG signals, and calories do not necessarily serve to actively guide an individual's personal healthcare management. Consumers are interested in qualitative feedback in addition to the quantitative measurements recorded by the devices. Integrating self-monitoring devices with healthcare providers can help close this gap by allowing healthcare professionals to track their patients' data remotely, which in turn allows for more personalized care and timely interventions.

== eHealth During COVID-19 ==
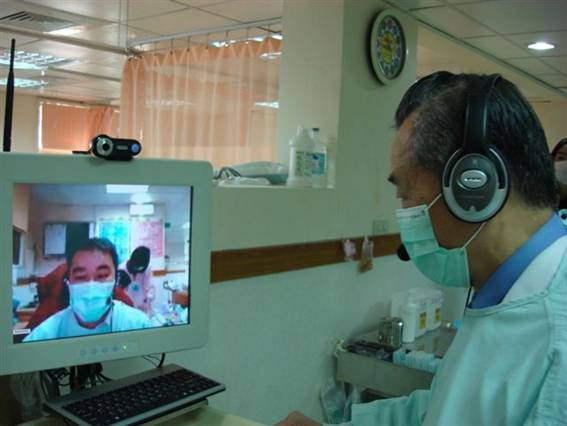
Online healthcare appointment via webcam

The pandemic that impacted the entire world made it extremely difficult for vast amounts of people to receive adequate healthcare in person. Elderly citizens and people with chronic health conditions were at more risk than the average healthy human, therefore they were more adversely affected than most. The switch from in-person to telehealth appointments and interventions was necessary to reduce the risks of spreading and/or contracting the disease. The forced use of telehealth during the pandemic highlighted its strengths and weaknesses, which accelerated the progression of this medium. The user feedback on eHealth during the COVID-19 pandemic was very positive, and consequently many patients and healthcare providers reported that they will continue to use this method of healthcare following the pandemic.

== In developing countries ==
eHealth in general, and telemedicine in particular, is a vital resource to remote regions of emerging and developing countries but is often difficult to establish because of the lack of communications infrastructure. For example, in Benin, hospitals often can become inaccessible due to flooding during the rainy season and across Africa, the low population density, along with severe weather conditions and the difficult financial situation in many African states, has meant that the majority of the African people are badly disadvantaged in medical care. Telemedicine in Nepal is becoming popular tool to improve health care delivery in order to combat difficult landscape. In many regions there is not only a significant lack of facilities and trained health professionals, but also no access to eHealth because there is also no internet access in remote villages, or even a reliable electricity supply.

Approximately 13 percent of people who live in Kenya have health insurance. A majority of the total health expenditure in sub-Saharan Africa was paid out-of-pocket, which forces millions into poverty yearly. A Kenyan service by the name of M-PESA may offer a solution to this problem. This mobile platform provides full transparency of patients needs and allows access to medical products and the ability to efficiently manage their funding.

Internet connectivity, and the benefits of eHealth, can be brought to these regions using satellite broadband technology, and satellite is often the only solution where terrestrial access may be limited, or poor quality, and one that can provide a fast connection over a vast coverage area.

== Evaluation ==
While eHealth has become an indispensable facet of healthcare in the past 5 years, there are still barriers preventing it from reaching its full potential. Knowledge of the socio-economic performance of eHealth is limited, and findings from evaluations are often challenging to transfer to other settings. Socio-economic evaluations of some narrow types of mHealth can rely on health economic methodologies, but larger scale eHealth may have too many variables, and tortuous, intangible cause and effect links may need a wider approach. There are no international guidelines for the usage of eHealth due to many variables such as ignorance on the matter, infrastructure issues, quality of healthcare professionals and lack of healthcare plans. It should also be stated that the effectiveness of eHealth is also dependent on the patient's condition. Some researchers believe that online healthcare may be most efficient as a supplement to in-person care.

== See also ==
- Personal science
- Human enhancement
- Digital health
- Quantified self
- Center for Telehealth and E-Health Law
- eHealthInsurance
- EUDRANET
- European Institute for Health Records
- Health 2.0
- Telehealth
- Seth Roberts
