= Quantified self =

Movement of people who track themselves with body-related data

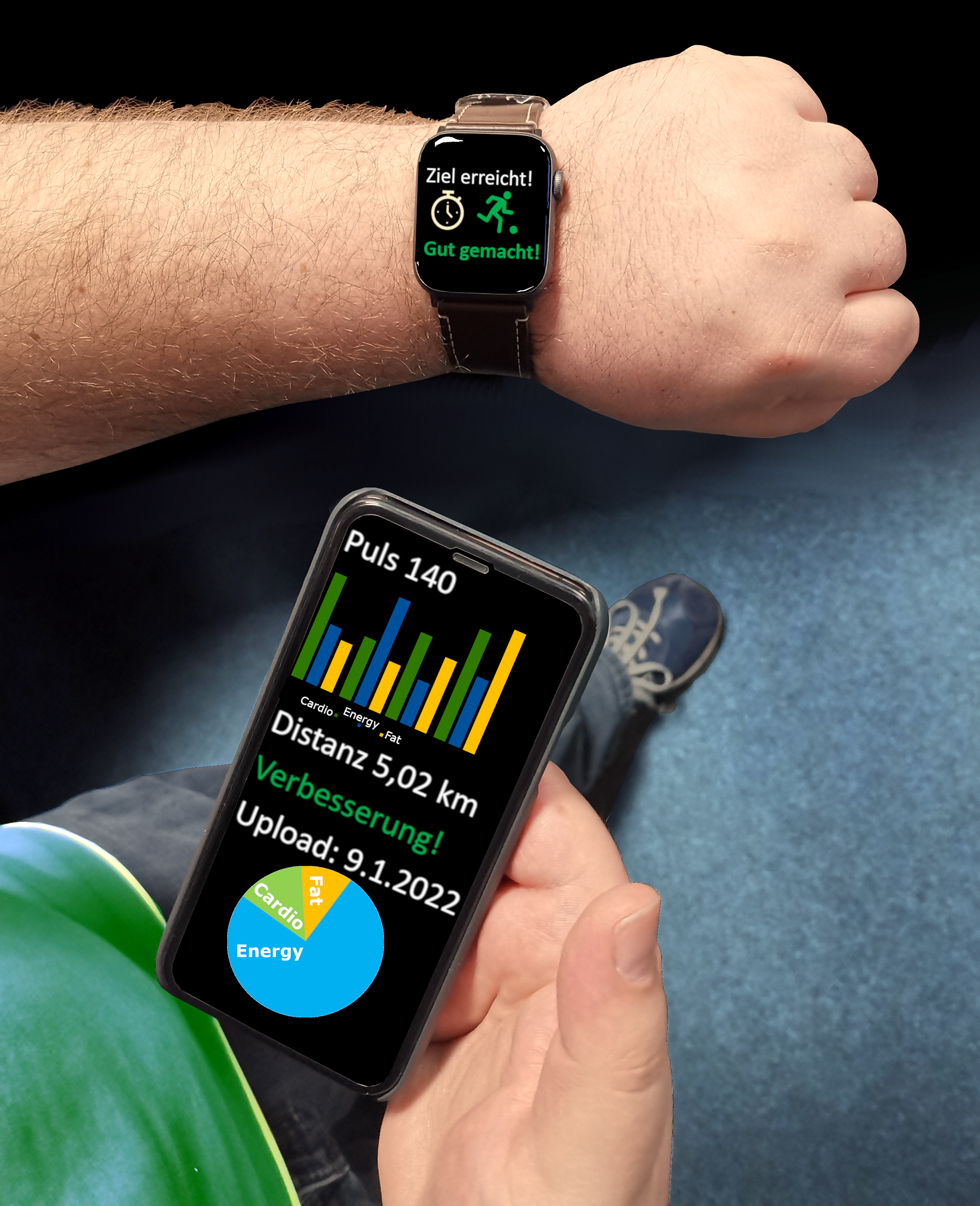
A smart watch being used with a mobile phone to gather data about the wearer

Quantified self is both the cultural phenomenon of self-tracking with technology and a community of users and makers of self-tracking tools who share an interest in "self-knowledge through numbers". Quantified self practices overlap with the practice of lifelogging and other trends that incorporate technology and data acquisition into daily life, often with the goal of improving physical, mental, and emotional performance. The widespread adoption in recent years of wearable fitness and sleep trackers such as the Fitbit or the Apple Watch, combined with the increased presence of Internet of things in healthcare and in exercise equipment, have made self-tracking accessible to a large segment of the population.

Other terms for using self-tracking data to improve daily functioning are auto-analytics, body hacking, self-quantifying, self-surveillance, sousveillance (recording of personal activity), and personal informatics.

== History ==
According to Riphagen et al., the history of the quantimetric self-tracking using wearable computers began in the 1970s:

"The history of self-tracking using wearable sensors in combination with wearable computing and wireless communication already exists for many years, and also appeared, in the form of sousveillance back in the 1970s [13, 12]"

Quantimetric self-sensing was proposed for the use of wearable computers to automatically sense and measure exercise and dietary intake in 2002:

"Sensors that measure biological signals, ... a personal data recorder that records ... Lifelong videocapture together with blood-sugar levels, ... correlate blood-sugar levels with activities such as eating, by capturing a food record of intake."

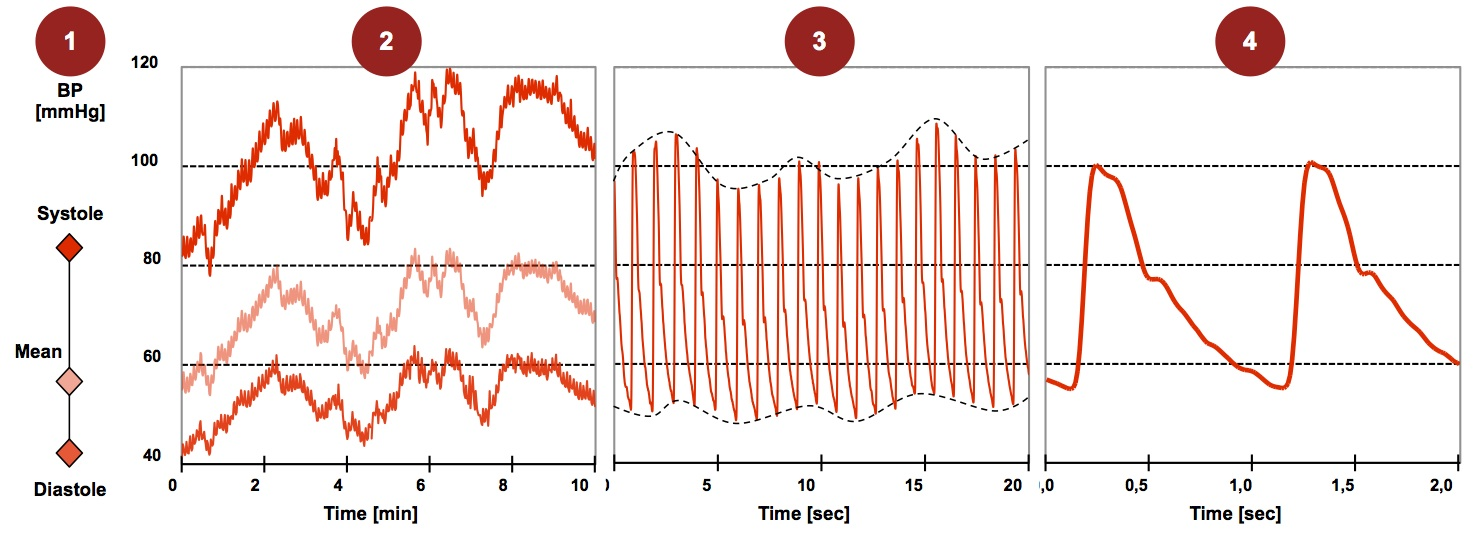
Blood pressure information

The terms "quantified self" and "self-tracking" are contemporary labels for common practice of using self-taken measurements and data collection.

The term quantified self appears to have been proposed in San Francisco by Wired magazine editors Gary Wolf and Kevin Kelly in 2007 as "a collaboration of users and tool makers who share an interest in self knowledge through self-tracking." In 2010, Wolf spoke about the movement at TED, and in May 2011, the first international conference was held in Mountain View, California. There are conferences in America and Europe. Gary Wolf said "Almost everything we do generates data." Wolf suggests that companies target advertising or recommend products use data from phones, tablets, computers, other technology, and credit cards. However, using the data they make can give people new ways to deal with medical problems, help sleep patterns, and improve diet.

Within the quantified self community, the concept of personal science has been developed. It is defined as: "the practice of exploring personally consequential questions by conducting self-directed N-of-1 studies using a structured empirical approach".

== Methodologies ==
Like any empirical study, the primary method is the collection and analysis of data. In many cases, data are collected automatically using wearable sensors, often worn on the wrist. In other cases, data may be logged manually, and some practitioners are combining digital tools for recording alongside more traditional journaling for an n-of-1 autoethnographic approach.

In 2024, a Wiki for collecting information about tools, methods and approaches used for quantified self, alongside quantified self-project descriptions, was co-created by researchers and practitioners, highlighting the diversity of approaches used, including the use of medical devices such as blood glucose monitors but also Do-It-Yourself tools such as "one-button trackers".

The data are typically analyzed using traditional techniques such as linear regression to establish correlations among the variables under investigation. As in every attempt to understand potentially high-dimensional data, visualization techniques can suggest hypotheses that may be tested more rigorously using formal methods. One simple example of a visualization method is to view the change in some variable over time.

The idea is not new, though technology has made it easier and simpler to gather and analyze personal data. Since these technologies have become smaller and cheaper to be put in smart phones or tablets, it is easier to take the quantitative methods used in science and business and apply them to the personal sphere.

Narratives constitute a symbiotic relationship with large bodies of data. Therefore, quantified self participants are encouraged to share their experiences of self-tracking at various conferences and meetings. A study into the motivations, goals and values of quantified self and personal science practitioners found that shared values and the social community aspects are a strong motivating factor. Since 2023, in-person conferences or online meetings have been recorded on the Quantified Self website.

== Applications ==
In 2013, the Wall Street Journal reported that new companies in the quantified self market were successful in fundraising despite difficulties in the healthcare industry. Many devices and services help with tracking physical activity, caloric intake, health patterns, sleep quality, posture, asthma and other factors involved in personal well-being. Corporate wellness programs, for example, will often encourage some form of tracking. Genetic testing and other services have also become popular.

In the field of education, the use of wearable devices in schools has been proposed so that that students can learn more about their own activities and related math and science.

A 2010 study of 125 Finnish trail runners in the journal Leisure Studies found that sharing self-collected exercise data online improved motivation by encouraging community support.

=== Quantified baby ===
Quantified baby is a branch of the quantified self movement that is concerned with collecting extensive data on a baby's daily activities, and using this data to make inferences about behavior and health. A number of software and hardware products exist to assist data collection by the parent or to collect data automatically for later analysis. Reactions to quantified baby are mixed.

Parents are often told by health professionals to record daily activities about their babies in the first few months, such as feeding times, sleeping times and diaper changes. This is useful for both the parent (used to maintain a schedule and ensure they remain organised) and for the health professional (to make sure the baby is on target and occasionally to assist in diagnosis).

For quantified self, knowledge is power, and knowledge about oneself easily translates as a tool for self-improvement. The aim for many is to use this tracking to ultimately become better parents. Some parents use sleep trackers because they worry about sudden infant death syndrome.

A number of apps exist that have been made for parents wanting to track their baby's daily activities. The most frequently tracked metrics are feeding, sleeping and diaper changes. Mood, activity, medical appointments and milestones are also sometimes covered. Other apps are specifically made for breastfeeding mothers, or those who are pumping their milk to build up a supply for their baby.

Quantified baby, as in quantified self, is associated with a combination of wearable sensors and wearable computing. The synergy of these is related to the concept of the Internet of things.

== Debates and criticism ==
The quantified self movement has faced some criticism related to the limitations it inherently contains or might pose to other domains. Within these debates, there are some discussions around the nature, responsibility, and outcome of the quantified self movement and its derivative practices. Generally, most bodies of criticism tackle the issue of data exploitation and data privacy but also health literacy skills in the practice of self-tracking. While most of the users engaging in self tracking practices are using the gathered data for self-knowledge and self-improvement, in some cases, self-tracking is pushed and forced by employers onto employees in certain workplace environments, health and life insurers or by substance addiction programs (drug and alcohol monitoring) in order to monitor the physical activity of the subject and analyze the data in order to gather conclusions. Usually the data gathered by this practice of self-tracking can be accessed by commercial, governmental, research and marketing agencies.

=== "Data fetishism" ===
Another recurrent line of debate revolves around "data fetishism". Data fetishism is a phenomenon evolving when active users of self-tracking devices become enticed by the satisfaction and sense of achievement and fulfillment that numerical data offer. Proponents of such lines of criticism tend to claim that data in this sense become simplistic, where complex phenomena become transcribed into reductionist data. This reductionist line of criticism generally incorporates fears and concerns with the ways in which ideas on health are redefined, as well as doctor-patient dynamics and the experience of self-hood among self-trackers. Because of such arguments, the quantified self movement has been criticized for providing predetermined ideals of health, well-being and self-awareness. Rather than increasing the personal skills for self-knowledge, it distances the user from the self by offering an inherently normative and reductionist framework.

=== Health literacy ===
An alternative line of criticism still linked to the reductionist discourse but still proposing a more hopeful solution is related the lack of health literacy among most of self-trackers. The European Health Literacy Survey Consortium Health defines health literacy as "[...] people's knowledge, motivations, and competencies to access, understand, appraise, and apply health information in order to make judgments and take decisions in everyday life concerning healthcare, disease prevention and health promotion to maintain or improve quality of life during the life course." Generally, people tend to focus mostly on the data collecting stage, while stages of data archiving, analysis and interpretation are often overlooked because of the skills necessary to conduct such processes, which explains the call for the improvement of health literacy skills among self-quantifiers.

The health literacy critique is different from the data-fetishist critique in its approach to data influence on the human life, health and experience. While the data-fetishist critical discourse ascribes a crucial power of influence to numbers and data, the health literacy critique views gathered data as useless and powerless without the human context and the analysis and reflection skills of the user that are needed to act on the numbers. Datum collection alone is not deterministic or normative, according to the health literacy critique. The "know thy numbers to know thyself" slogan of the quantified self movement is inconsistent, it has been claimed, in the sense that it does not fully acknowledge the need for auxiliary skills of health literacy to actually get to "know thyself". The solution proposed by proponents of the health literacy critique in order to improve the practice of self-tracking and its results is a focus on addressing individual and systemic barriers. The individual barriers are faced by elderly citizens when having to deal with contemporary technology or in cases where there is a need for culturally-sound practices while systemic barriers could be overcome when involving the participation of more health literacy experts and the organization of health literacy education.

=== Burden of tracking ===
Self-tracking can be burdensome in the sense that it takes time, and also that it can be experienced as a reminder that one is sick. A study exploring self-tracking of Parkinson's disease found recommendations for balanced self-tracking: focusing on positive aspects, using improved tools, and discussing self-tracking results with healthcare providers.

== See also ==
- Personal science – Science applied to one's own problems
- Self-experimentation – Research experiment conducted on oneself
- Seth Roberts – American psychology professor & blogger (1953–2014)
- eHealth – Healthcare services enhanced by digital technologies, workflows
- Experience sampling method – Longitudinal research methodology
- Fitness app – Mobile application used for fitness purposes
- Human enhancement – Natural, artificial, or technological alteration of the human body
  - Transhumanism – Philosophical movement
- N of 1 trial – Single patient clinical trial
- Real world data – Medical data derived from many sources
- Simple living – Simplified, minimalistic lifestyle
