= Center for Telehealth and E-Health Law =

Center for Telehealth & E-Health Law
- Abbreviation: CTeL
- Formation: 1995
- Type: non-profit organization

The Center for Telehealth & E-Health Law (CTeL), established in 1995 by a consortium including the Mayo Foundation, Cleveland Clinic Foundation, Texas Children's Hospital, and the Mid-West Rural Telemedicine Consortium, is a non-profit organization committed to overcoming legal and regulatory barriers to the utilization of telehealth and related e-health services. CTeL, based in Washington, D.C., specializes in compiling, analyzing and disseminating information on legal and regulatory issues information associated with telemedicine and digital health, including artificial intelligence. It also handles underlying issues such as licensure, privacy and security, mental and behavioral health, and reimbursement.

CTeL briefs public policymakers, sponsors and funds research reports, and provides testimony in support of telehealth and the advancement of digital health.

== AI Blue Ribbon Collaborative ==
CTeL offers a variety of services, including involvement in public policy, research, event coordination, education, and collaboration. Recently, CTeL launched regional chapters and an AI Blue Ribbon Collaborative. The AI Blue Ribbon Collaborative is an initiative that assembles a panel of experts to act as an independent resource for clinical and legal questions regarding the use of AI.

== CTeL Policy Research Fellowship ==
CTeL offers a Policy Research Fellowship. The CTeL Policy Research Fellowship is a multidisciplinary program designed for emerging leaders and scholars who aim to shape the future of telehealth through research and policy analysis. This fellowship aims to advance telehealth practices and policies on a national and global scale.
