= Bruce Allen (American football) =

American football executive (born 1956)

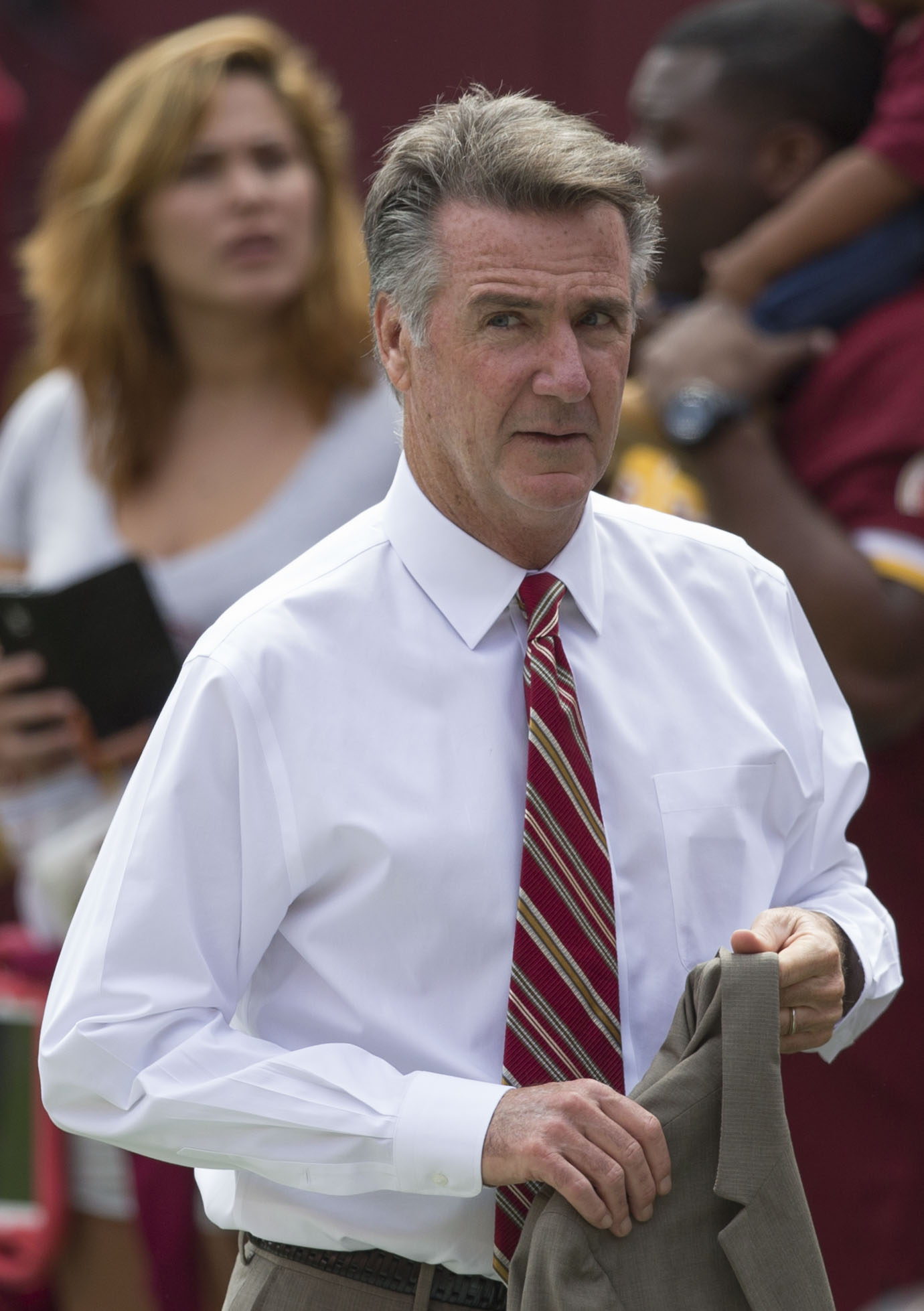
- Allen in 2015

Personal information
- Born: October 26, 1956 (age 70); Pasadena, California, U.S.

Career information
- High school: Langley (McLean, Virginia)
- College: Richmond (1974–1977)
- NFL draft: 1978: 12th round, 329th overall pick

Career history

Coaching
- Arizona State Sun Devils (1978) Graduate assistant; Occidental Tigers (1979) Head coach; Los Angeles Thunderbolts (1980) Head coach

Operations
- Montreal Alouettes (1982) Vice president of operations; Chicago Blitz (1983) General manager; Arizona Wranglers (1984) General manager; Oakland Raiders (1995–2003) Senior executive; Tampa Bay Buccaneers (2004–2008) General manager; Washington Redskins (2010–2013) Executive vice president/general manager; Washington Redskins (2014–2016) President/general manager; Washington Redskins (2017–2019) President

Awards and highlights
- Richmond Spiders Hall of Fame (2016); NFL Executive of the Year (2002); All-ECAC (1977)
- Executive profile at Pro Football Reference

Bruce Gerald Allen (born October 26, 1956) is an American former professional football executive. He served as general manager in the National Football League (NFL) for the Tampa Bay Buccaneers from 2004 to 2008 and the Washington Redskins from 2010 to 2019. He first joined the NFL as a senior executive with the Oakland Raiders in 1995.

Allen played college football as a punter for the Richmond Spiders and was selected by the Baltimore Colts in the 12th round of the 1978 NFL draft, but never played. Allen is the son of Pro Football Hall of Fame coach George Allen and younger brother of former Virginia governor and U.S. Senator George Allen.

== Early life and college career ==
Allen was born on October 26, 1956, in Pasadena, California. He is the son of Pro Football Hall of Fame coach George Allen and younger brother of former Virginia governor and U.S. Senator, George Allen. Allen attended Langley High School in McLean, Virginia, in the early 1970s before attending the University of Richmond, where he played college football for the Spiders from 1974 to 1977. In his junior season, he broke the school record for punting, averaging 42.9 yards a kick; those numbers resulted in him being named to that year's All-ECAC and All-South Independent teams. He was drafted by the Baltimore Colts in the 12th round (329th overall) of the 1978 NFL draft, but did not play for the team. Allen was inducted in the Spiders Hall of Fame in 2016.

== Coaching career ==
Allen began his coaching career in 1978 when was hired as a graduate assistant at Arizona State University to serve on the football coaching staff under head coach Frank Kush. In 1979, Allen was the head football coach at Occidental College, a small NCAA Division III school in Los Angeles, where he led them to a 2–6–1 record before resigning after the season to coach the Los Angeles Thunderbolts of the California Football League in 1980.

== Executive career ==
=== CFL ===
In 1982, Allen's father was named team president of the Montreal Alouettes of the Canadian Football League. The younger Allen joined the team as vice president of operations and was given oversight of the team's marketing, promotion, and finance departments. George Allen left the Alouettes after two months due to the team's financial troubles and the club folded not long after.

=== USFL ===
George Allen was named head coach of the United States Football League's Chicago Blitz on June 21, 1982 and Allen joined the team as general manager. On September 30, 1983, Blitz owner Edward Diethrich swapped franchises with Arizona Wranglers owner Jim Joseph. Both Allens and most of the Blitz players moved to the Wranglers for the 1984 season. Allen resigned on October 30, 1984, stating that he could "no longer promise our players a winning program" due to a pending merger with the Oklahoma Outlaws.

=== Player agent ===
In 1985, Allen founded GBA Sportsworld, an athlete representation and marketing company. His clients included David Fulcher, Craig Heyward, Ickey Woods, Tony Woods, Ed Simmons, Mike Utley, Joe Tofflemire, Darryl Clack, and Tom Gibson.

=== Oakland Raiders ===
Allen joined the Oakland Raiders organization as a senior executive in 1995, specializing in salary cap management and free agency negotiations. He won the George Young Executive of the Year award with the club during their AFC Championship year in 2002.

In 1995, Allen made the news by flying to Utah on behalf of the Raiders to offer a three-year, $1.5 million contract to standout BYU football player Eli Herring who was drafted in the sixth round. Herring had announced he would not play in the NFL due to his religious beliefs against working on Sundays, but the Raiders hoped he would eventually change his mind. However, Herring declined Allen's offer. Herring rejected the offer.

=== Tampa Bay Buccaneers ===
Following the 2003 season, the Tampa Bay Buccaneers gave general manager Rich McKay permission to leave the team as his relationship with Super Bowl XXXVII-winning coach Jon Gruden had deteriorated. The Glazer family, which owned and oversaw the Buccaneers, hired Allen to replace McKay, as Allen had previously worked with Gruden in Oakland. Allen immediately began looking for a more youthful team. This included releasing long-time Buccaneer John Lynch and allowing Warren Sapp to leave for free agency, along with drafting Auburn running back Cadillac Williams in the 2005 NFL draft.

The Buccaneers performance during Allen's tenure was mixed. His first year there, the team went 5–11. The next year however, they were 11–5 and won the NFC South division in 2005, but went 4–12 in 2006. The team rebounded to a 9–7 record and another NFC South title in 2007, after which Allen had his contract extended to 2011. Following a second 9–7 record in 2008 and missing the playoffs after four consecutive losses in December, however, both Allen and Gruden were fired.

=== Washington Redskins ===
On December 17, 2009, Allen was hired as the general manager of the Washington Redskins. Allen's father coached the Redskins to its first Super Bowl appearance in 1972. Shortly after Allen joined the Redskins, Jim Zorn and his staff were fired, allowing Mike Shanahan to be hired as head coach and executive vice president of football operations. While Shanahan had the final say in football decisions, he and Allen split the duties of general manager, working in an arrangement similar to how Bill Belichick and Scott Pioli operated with the New England Patriots at the time. For the uncapped season in 2010, the League had advised all teams to not explicitly use it as a method to create cap room in the future when the salary cap would return. Allen and the team failed to heed the warnings of the league and did so anyway. As a result, Washington suffered a US$36 million salary cap penalty split between the 2012 and 2013 seasons.

After Shanahan was fired following the 2013 season, Allen had final say on football operations, hiring Cincinnati Bengals offensive coordinator Jay Gruden to replace Shanahan as head coach. While general manager, Allen attempted to bridge the connection between the modern Redskins and the glory years of past, include hosting golf tournaments with former players and coaches, to bringing back the gold pants that his father's team had used in the 1970s.

In 2014, Allen was additionally given the title of team president. Allen abdicated his title of general manager after the Redskins hired Scot McCloughan to be their new one on January 7, 2015, later becoming the de facto general manager again upon the firing of McCloughan after the 2016 season. On October 7, 2019, Allen attempted to defend his tenure with the Redskins by saying "the culture is actually damn good". Allen's tenure with the team was met with heavy criticism and disapproval, with a popular "FireBruceAllen" hashtag campaign being used on social media throughout the latter half of the 2010s, before he was fired following a 3–13 season in 2019. The Redskins posted a record of 62–97–1 during his tenure with only two postseason appearances, going 0–2 in them.

In October 2021, emails between Allen and football coach and commentator Jon Gruden were leaked to The New York Times. According to the emails, Gruden sent several sexist, racist, and homophobic remarks to Allen throughout the 2010s. The two also exchanged topless photos of Washington cheerleaders. Gruden resigned as head coach of the Las Vegas Raiders following the report.

== Head coaching record ==
Year	Team	Overall	Conference	Standing
Occidental Tigers (Southern California Intercollegiate Athletic Conference) (1979)
1979	Occidental	2–6–1	1–4	6th
Total:		2–6–1		
