= Kernel (neurotechnology company) =

American neurotechnology company

HI, LLC
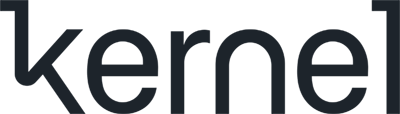
- Trade name: Kernel
- Type: Private
- Founded: 2016; 10 years ago
- Founder: Bryan Johnson
- Headquarters: Los Angeles, California, U.S.
- Website: kernel.com

HI, LLC, doing business as Kernel, is an American company that has developed a non-invasive neuroimaging technology. It is a privately held company headquartered in Los Angeles, California. The company was founded in 2016 by Bryan Johnson.

== History ==
Johnson founded Kernel in 2016 with a $54 million investment and began researching neuroprosthetics, devices implanted into the brain that mimic, substitute, or assist brain functions.

In May 2020, Kernel introduced two brain-activity monitoring devices, Flux and Flow. The Flow devices can measure electromagnetic activity from cortical sources, and cortical oxy-/deoxyhemoglobin concentration changes (a slow hemodynamic proxy for neural activity) using TD-fNIRS.

Kernel also introduced "Sound ID," a software that can tell what speech or song a person is listening to just from brain data. The company was featured in the 2020 documentary, I Am Human, about brain–machine interfaces. Kernel raised $53 million in 2020.

=== Kernel Flow ===
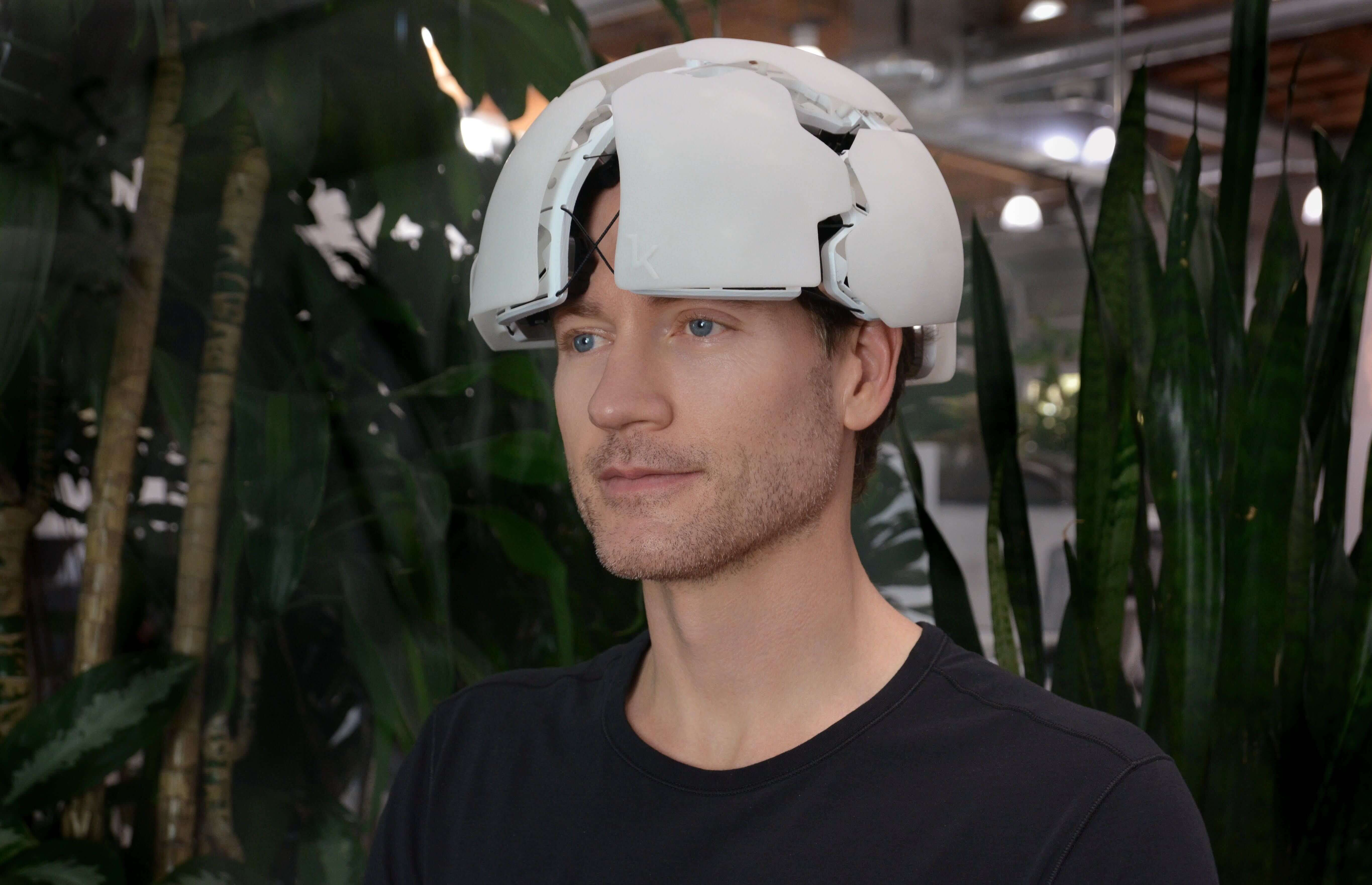
Johnson wearing Kernel's Flow helmet in 2021

Kernel Flow is a wearable time-domain functional near-infrared spectroscopy (TD-fNIRS) system. fNIRs uses infrared light to measure changes in the oxygenation of blood, which is a proxy for neural activity. Kernel Flow can achieve a 200 Hz sampling rate. The spatial resolution of f-NIRS is strongly limited by scattering, with most existing f-NIRS systems having resolutions > 2 cm.

== Operations ==
Johnson hopes to be able "to read and write the underlying functions of the brain."

As of 2019, the company is researching neurological diseases and dysfunctions such as Alzheimer's and Parkinson's diseases, depression and anxiety. Kernel also offers neuroscience as a service to scientists and businesses, conducting subject testing at their office.

Notable former employees include Kate Tolo, who went on to co-found several companies with Johnson.
