= Medical scribe =

Professional who charts physician-patient encounters in real time

A medical scribe is an allied health paraprofessional who specializes in charting physician-patient encounters in real time, such as during medical examinations. They also locate information and patients for physicians and complete forms needed for patient care. Depending on which area of practice the scribe works in, the position may also be called clinical scribe, ER scribe or ED scribe (in the emergency department), or just scribe (when the context is implicit). A scribe is trained in health information management and the use of health information technology to support it. A scribe can work on-site (at a hospital or clinic) or remotely from a HIPAA-secure facility. Medical scribes who work at an off-site location are known as virtual medical scribes.

== Role ==
A medical scribe's primary duties are to follow a physician through their work day and chart patient encounters in real-time using a medical office's electronic health record (EHR) and existing templates. Responsibilities will vary with the scribe's department rules. Medical scribes generate referral letters for physicians, book appointments and manage and sort medical documents within the EHR system, as well as performing some quasi-secretarial duties. Some scribes assist with e-prescribing (this is prohibited in some jurisdictions and allowed in others). Scribes also find information (such as medical records from other hospitals or test results) and people (such as on-call consultants). Medical scribes can be thought of as data care managers and clerical personal assistants, enabling physicians, medical assistants, and nurses to focus on patient in-take and care during clinic hours. Medical scribes, by handling data management tasks for physicians in real-time, free the physician to increase patient contact time, give more thought to complex cases, better manage patient flow through the department, and increase productivity to see more patients.

The introduction of electronic health records has revolutionized the practice of medicine. However, the complexity of some systems has resulted in providers spending more time documenting the encounter instead of speaking with and examining the patient. A tool which was intended to alleviate some problems of clinical documentation has caused many problems for the very people who were supposed to benefit from the technology: the providers. As a result, providers are experiencing burnout and dissatisfaction. An increasing body of research has shown the use of medical scribes is usually, but not always, associated with improved overall physician productivity, cost- and time-savings. Patients tolerate scribes well and no differences in patient satisfaction can be found when scribes are present. An in-depth study conducted by The Vancouver Clinic in Vancouver, WA from 2011-2012 found that medical scribes improved the quality of clinical documentation and allowed doctors to see extra patients, while noting the risks associated with scribe turnover and doctors' unfamiliarity with the scribe concept. Most physicians like working with scribes and many authors recommend that healthcare providers employ medical scribes to reduce time spent performing data entry and other administrative tasks, which can increase physician fatigue and dissatisfaction.

== ER scribe ==
An ER scribe works in the emergency department (ED) of a hospital. Their duties may include overseeing the documentation of each patient's visit to the ED and acting as the physician's personal assistant. A scribe might work with one physician per shift or might be shared between multiple providers, depending on the agency.

A prospective scribe is required to learn a large and extensive amount of medical terminology, as well as become familiar with human anatomy. They are also required to learn about health systems and healthcare worker roles, patient privacy, professionalism, communication, information technology, healthcare worker safety and infection control. Each program has their own training regimen and some are more structured than others. For example, some programs require that all new scribes take an official graded course prior to working. Other programs allow the scribe to start in the ED immediately, but only under supervision that is sometimes referred to as bedside training.

The first scribe programs were based in Reno, Nevada. Subsequently, in 1995, Dr. Elliott Trotter, M.D., a physician practicing in Fort Worth, Texas, discovered the Nevada program and decided to start a program at Harris Methodist Hospital. Dr. John Geesbreght, an ER physician at Harris Methodist Hospital, with approval from Texas Christian University (TCU) administration, recruited four pre-med TCU students to establish what is now ScribeAmerica. ScribeAmerica bought PhysAssist Scribes, which was previously the oldest medical scribe company in The United States, in 2019.

Medical scribe programs quickly expanded to other cities. Some of these programs have retained the original program paradigm; others have elected to create their own from scratch. Technology advances have seen the introduction of "portable tablets" within some hospitals, reducing the risk of transcription errors.

There are some programs that have expanded beyond the original model and its core subjects considerably, including more pertinent and up-to-date information. A few programs have included more advanced training topics and utilize standardized tests to certify preparedness to work in a particular clinical environment.

For each patient seen in the ED, a scribe may:

- Accompany the physician into the exam room
- Document the history of the patient's present illness
- Document the Review-of-Systems (ROS) and physical examination
- Enter vital signs and keep track of lab values
- Look up pertinent past medical records
- Keep track of and enter the results of imaging studies
- Prioritize the physician's time by bringing critical lab results to his/her attention
- Type progress and update notes
- Document the patient's discharge plan and any prescriptions

Scribe positions are often filled by college students pursuing careers in medicine, with some organizations providing assistance with college fees. Many of those college undergraduates plan to apply to programs in healthcare, such as medical school, PA school, and nursing programs. Pre-health students who work as scribes gain practical experience as well as networking connections from working alongside a healthcare team. These students are able to build relationships with medical practitioners who are usually willing to write letters of recommendation for professional school applications on the students' behalf. Some scribe organizations have opted to not hire college students pursuing healthcare careers, due to the subsequent high rate of attrition, while others give preference to students who are on healthcare career tracks. Also, due to this relationship between the doctor, scribe and professional school applications, some scribe programs limit the positions to seniors of undergraduate programs.

== Joint Commission guidelines ==
The Joint Commission released guidelines for the use of medical scribes in July 2012. The Joint Commission's guidelines explained: "A scribe is an unlicensed person hired to enter information into the EHR or chart at the direction of a physician or practitioner (Licensed Independent Practitioner, Advanced Practice Registered Nurse or Physician Assistant). It is the Joint Commission's stand that the scribe does not and may not act independently but can document the previously determined physician's or practitioner's dictation and/or activities. Scribes also assist the practitioners listed above in navigating the EMR and in locating information such as test results and lab results. They can support work flow and documentation for medical record coding. Scribes are used most frequently, but not exclusively, in emergency departments where they accompany the physician or practitioner and record information into the medical record, with the goal of allowing the physician or practitioner to spend more time with the patient and have accurate documentation. Scribes are sometimes used in other areas of the hospital or ambulatory facility. They can be employed by the healthcare organization, the physician or practitioner or be a contracted service." The American Health Information Management Association also published guidance in its November 2012 edition of Journal of AHIMA for physicians on the use of medical scribes, echoing and elaborating on The Joint Commission's guidance by explaining that "a scribe can be found in multiple settings including physician practices, hospitals, emergency departments, long-term care facilities, long-term acute care hospitals, public health clinics, and ambulatory care centers. They can be employed by a healthcare organization, physician, licensed independent practitioner, or work as a contracted service."

== Scribe programs ==
Hospitals are adding scribe programs to their campuses all over the world. There are three types of programs. Some smaller programs are in-house in the facility (run by the health system or office, scribes are direct employees of the facility). Other programs are in-house at a medical group that contracts with the facility (scribes are direct employees of the medical group), such as at EMA, Vituity (formerly CEP America), and CityMD. Aside from these, there are also independent medical scribe companies that contract with a hospital or doctor's group to provide services.

=== Training and certification ===
While most scribe companies provide their own individualized training to assure quality and consistency, there are also training programs that exist outside the curriculum provided by each company.

The American College of Medical Scribe Specialists (ACMSS) is the nation's only nonprofit professional society. ACMSS certifies medical scribes as either a Certified Medical Scribe Specialist or a Certified Medical Scribe Apprentice.

=== Scribe program economics ===
The decision about whether to commence a scribe program at a clinic, practice or facility, is usually either decided based on economic information, the impact on physicians or a combination of both. Gains for the facility can be realised by increasing physician productivity (patients per doctor per unit of time), increasing patient throughput (cost of opening treatment spaces and staffing them, compared to the number of patients that occupy that space per unit of time) and the per-patient revenue (which varies markedly depending on the health system and facility). Costs for the facility include start-up (implementation), training scribes (if undertaken in-house) and operational costs (scribe labor, support/management staff labor and equipment updates/replacement). Economic information regarding the impact of a scribe program has been summarised in a systematic review undertaken by Heaton et al. The cost of training program and training scribes in-house has been reported and there is a multicentre randomised study evaluating the impact of scribes on emergency physician productivity and patient throughput which demonstrates increased physician productivity and reduced patient length of stay in emergency rooms.

== Remote scribe ==
As the COVID-19 prevailed all over the world, enforcement and social distancing transformed the medical scribes into telescribes. Clinician used their own mobile phones or tablets to record the conversation and notes during patient visit which then sent to the scribe to transform into EHR. To overcome this, physicians shifted to the digital scribing. Digital scribing is the advancement in technology that works by the voice and converts the vocal message into written notes which makes the voice into meaningful text. With the ease of recording data this technology improved the quality of time between the patient and physician, increased healthcentre productivity and decreases lengthy training of the scribes as well as physicians.

There is little research available about the successful implementation of this technology and many areas still need research. It is observed that digital scribing reduces the overall cost of the hiring and training of a scribe other than upfront costs in initiating this system. So, there is a need to research to determine the time required to recover the invested cost after implementation of the system. It is considered that this system has the ability to replace medical scribes if the software used ensures validity and integrated with the EHR. The other limitation is that when patient visits a scribe, some information remains unclear like length of stay time in hospital, outside lab visit and text sent through the patient portal etc. All this information needs to be appropriately edited into the record otherwise no one can eliminate the necessity of a physical scribe at the clinic.

== Automated medical scribes ==
An automated medical scribe is a tool that uses artificial intelligence to perform the duties typically associated with a human medical scribe.

While human scribes physically accompany healthcare providers during patient visits, AI scribes typically operate in the background, usually on a provider's device.
