= Zero-knowledge service =

In cloud computing, the term zero-knowledge (or occasionally no-knowledge or zero-access) is a commonly used term for online services that store, transfer or manipulate data with a high level of confidentiality, where the data is only accessible to the data's owner (the client), and not to the service provider. However, unlike "end-to-end encryption", the term "zero-knowledge" does not imply any specific threat model or security notion, and its use is commonly frowned-upon by the security community.

The term "zero-knowledge" was popularized by backup service SpiderOak, which later switched to using the term "no knowledge", acknowledging that the previous terminology was not technically accurate.

== Disadvantages ==
Most cloud storage services keep a copy of the client's password on their servers, allowing clients who have lost their passwords to retrieve and decrypt their data using alternative means of authentication; but since zero-knowledge services do not store copies of clients' passwords, if a client loses their password then their data cannot be decrypted, making it practically unrecoverable.

Most of the most used cloud storage services, such as Google Drive, Dropbox, OneDrive or iCloud, are also able to furnish access requests from law enforcement agencies for similar reasons; zero-knowledge services, however, are unable to do so, since their systems are designed to make clients' data inaccessible without the client's explicit cooperation.
