= Consumer health informatics =

Consumer health informatics (CHI) is a sub-branch of health informatics that helps bridge the gap between patients and health resources. It is defined by the American Medical Informatics Association as "the field devoted to informatics from multiple consumer or patient views". The Consumer Health Informatics Working Group (CHIWG) of the International Medical Informatics Association (IMIA) define it as "the use of modern computers and telecommunications to support consumers in obtaining information, analyzing unique health care needs and helping them make decisions about their own health".

== Scope ==
CHI includes patient-focused informatics, health literacy, and consumer education. The focus of this field is to allow consumers to manage their own health, through the use of internet-based strategies and resources with consumer-friendly language. Currently, CHI It stands at the crossroads of other disciplines, such as nursing informatics, public health, health promotion, health education, library science, and communication science.

Consumer health informatics include technologies focused on patients as the primary users to health information. It includes: information resources, communications, remote monitoring, videoconferencing, and telepresence. The Kaiser model is an example of allowing patients to remotely communicate with their physicians or other healthcare professionals.

== See also ==
- e-patient
- Health 2.0
- Participatory medicine
