= The Shangri-La Diet =

2006 book by Seth Roberts

The Shangri-La Diet: The No Hunger Eat Anything Weight Loss Plan
- Author: Seth Roberts
- Language: English
- Subject: Dieting
- Genre: Non-fiction
- Publisher: Perigee Books
- Publication date: April 2006
- Publication place: United States
- Pages: 203 pp
- ISBN: 978-0-399-53316-7
- OCLC: 123498697
- Dewey Decimal: 613.2/5 22
- LC Class: RM222.2 .R5597 2007

The Shangri-La Diet is both the name of a book by the psychologist Seth Roberts, a professor at Tsinghua University and professor emeritus at UC Berkeley, and the name of the diet that the book advocates. The book discusses consuming 100–400 calories per day in a flavorless food such as extra-light olive oil or canola oil one hour outside of mealtimes as a method of appetite suppression leading to weight loss.

== Inspiration ==
As a graduate student, Roberts studied animal cognition. As a psychology professor, Roberts read a report by Israel Ramirez, a scientist at the Monell Chemical Senses Center, about the effect of saccharin on the growth and weight of rats. Based on this research, he developed a new theory of weight control. The theory is based mostly on self-experimentation data that led him to conclude a relationship with calories consumed and "flavor" programmed by the brain. A key insight came from the observation of subjects who were unfamiliar to drinking common soft drinks; they uniformly recoiled at the experience. He recommended eating foods with a low glycemic index like sushi. The result was a loss of significant weight.

In 2000, Roberts visited Paris. He noticed in himself a significant loss of appetite and speculated that it was due to experiencing unfamiliar flavors of soft drinks that were not available to him in the USA. He reasoned, postulated, and concluded that there was a very deep association of familiar "flavorful" flavors with the regulation of body weight and that what a person eats can alter the setpoint. The more familiar and "flavorful" the food, the greater the effect on the body's setpoint or self-regulating system. So, accordingly, eating flavorful junkfood that is very high in flavor will increase the setpoint while taking 100-400 "flavorless" calories per day between meals will reduce the body's setpoint. Seth Roberts focused entirely on the psychology of the association by the brain with calories and familiar flavors and that effect on the setpoint.

== Book summary ==
The book features short anecdotes from followers of the diet who had heard of it through Roberts' blog or The New York Times. Roberts' diet is based on the fundamental principle of a set point – the weight which, according to Roberts, a person's brain strives to maintain. When actual weight is below the set point, appetite increases; when actual weight is above the set point, appetite decreases. Furthermore, eating certain foods can raise or lower the set point. Foods that have a strong flavor-calorie relationship (such as fast food or donuts) raise the set point, whereas bland foods which are slowly digested (like extra light olive oil or fructose mixed with water) lower the set point. Roberts states that the diet is based upon connecting two unconnected fields: weight control and associative learning. Because of this, the research behind the diet is from multiple fields, ranging from Pavlovian psychology to physiology to rat psychology.

== About the diet ==
The diet calls for consuming 100–400 calories per day of flavorless food between normal meals (i.e. any foods with flavor). The flavorless food may be extra-light (not to be confused with extra-virgin) olive oil, canola oil or unflavored sugar water for a weight loss of about a pound per week. It must be consumed in a flavorless window, which is at least one hour after flavors have been consumed, and at least one hour before flavors will be consumed. The consumption of flavorless calories supposedly lowers the set point, and therefore lowers weight. For additional impact for enhanced loss of weight up to two pounds per week, he recommends eating bland food.

== Reception ==
Through word of mouth, the book became a New York Times bestseller in May, 2006. It was featured on Good Morning America, on which journalist Diane Sawyer tried a tablespoon of olive oil. It received additional coverage by The Times, ABC News, The New York Times, and The Washington Post.

Roberts was criticized by UCLA medical professor John Ford on the fact that it had not been subjected to scientific peer review. In an interview on the Canadian Broadcasting Corporation's Sunday Night program, nutritionist David Jenkins also criticized the lack of scientific research validating the diet. In the same program, Roberts responded, saying that the results are there for all to see and that "there was no need for a big study to demonstrate the obvious". Jenkins admitted that the diet can only be benign, saying, "It is both cheap and safe."

== See also ==
- List of diets
