= Single-subject research =

Group of research methods

Single-subject research is a group of research methods that are used extensively in the experimental analysis of behavior and applied behavior analysis with both human and non-human participants. This research strategy focuses on one participant and tracks their progress in the research topic over a period of time. Single-subject research allows researchers to track changes in an individual over a large stretch of time instead of observing different people at different stages. This type of research can provide critical data in several fields, specifically psychology. It is most commonly used in experimental and applied analysis of behaviors. This research has been heavily debated over the years. Some believe that this research method is not effective at all while others praise the data that can be collected from it. Principal methods in this type of research are: A-B-A-B designs, Multi-element designs, Multiple Baseline designs, Repeated acquisition designs, Brief experimental designs and Combined designs.

These methods form the heart of the data collection and analytic code of behavior analysis. Behavior analysis is data driven, inductive, and disinclined to hypothetico-deductive methods.

== Experimental questions ==
Experimental questions are decisive in determining the nature of the experimental design to be selected. There are four basic types of experimental questions: demonstration, comparison, parametric, and component. A demonstration is "Does A cause or influence B?". A comparison is "Does A1 or A2 cause or influence B more?". A parametric question is "How much of A will cause how much change or influence on B?". A component question is "Which part of A{1,2,3} - A1 or A2 or A3... - causes or influences B?" where A is composed of parts that can be separated and tested.

The A-B-A-B design is useful for demonstration questions.

== A-B-A-B ==
=== A-B-A-B ===
A-B-A-B designs begin with establishing a baseline (A #1) then introduce a new behavior or treatment (B #1). Then there is a return to the baseline (A #2) by removing B #1. B #2 is a return of the new behavior or treatment.

=== A-B ===
An AB design is a two-part or phase design composed of a baseline ("A" phase) with no changes and a treatment or intervention ("B") phase. If there is a change then the treatment may be said to have had an effect. However, it is subject to many possible competing hypotheses, making strong conclusions difficult. Variants on the AB design introduce ways to control for the competing hypotheses to allow for stronger conclusions.

=== Reversal or A-B-A ===
The reversal design is the most powerful of the single-subject research designs showing a strong reversal from baseline ("A") to treatment ("B") and back again. If the variable returns to baseline measure without a treatment then resumes its effects when reapplied, the researcher can have greater confidence in the efficacy of that treatment. However, many interventions cannot be reversed, some for ethical reasons (e.g., involving self-injurious behavior, smoking) and some for practical reasons (they cannot be unlearned, like a skill).

Further ethics notes: It may be unethical to end an experiment on a baseline measure if the treatment is self-sustaining and highly beneficial and/or related to health. Control condition participants may also deserve the benefits of research once all data has been collected. It is a researcher's ethical duty to maximize benefits and to ensure that all participants have access to those benefits when possible.

=== A-B-C ===
The A-B-C design is a variant that allows for the extension of research questions around component, parametric and comparative questions.

== Multielement ==
Multi-element designs sometimes referred to as alternating-treatment designs are used in order to ascertain the comparative effect of two treatments. Two treatments are alternated in rapid succession and correlated changes are plotted on a graph to facilitate comparison. Multi-element designs are typically used in Single-subject research to accurately test multiple independent variables at once.

== Multiple baseline ==
The multiple baseline design was first reported in 1960 as used in basic operant research. It was applied in the late 1960s to human experiments in response to practical and ethical issues that arose in withdrawing apparently successful treatments from human subjects. In it two or more (often three) behaviors, people or settings are plotted in a staggered graph where a change is made to one, but not the other two, and then to the second, but not the third behavior, person or setting. Differential changes that occur to each behavior, person or in each setting help to strengthen what is essentially an AB design with its problematic competing hypotheses.

Multiple baseline tests are used to determine the helpfulness of an intervention. By focusing daily data collection on one participant, researchers can prepare to expand their research. This research method yields a high amount of data that can be analyzed by researchers. This data can then be used to support a researchers hypothesis and/or give insight before moving on to a group research project.

== Repeated Acquisition ==
In addition to multiple baseline designs, a way to deal with problematic reversibility is the use of repeated acquisitions.

== Brief ==
A designed favored by applied settings researchers where logistical challenges, time and other limits make research difficult are variants of multi-element and A-B-A-B type designs.

== Combined ==
Combined Single-subject research is used to gain added knowledge on the research question and are used to make group research run better. The combined design has arisen from a need to obtain answers to more complex research questions. Combining two or more single-case designs, such as A-B-A-B and multiple baseline, may produce such answers.

== Multipleprobe ==
Popular in Verbal Behavior research, the multipleprobe research design has elements of the other research designs.

== Changing-Criterion ==
In a changing-criterion research design a criterion for reinforcement is changed across the experiment to demonstrate a functional relation between the reinforcement and the behavior.

== See also ==
- Single-subject design
- N of 1 trial
- Applied behavior analysis
- Verbal behavior
- B.F. Skinner

== Sources ==
- Kennedy, Craig H. (2005). Single-case designs for educational research. Boston: Pearson/A & B. ISBN 0-205-34023-7.
- HAINS, ANN HIGGINS. “Multi-Element Designs for Early Intervention Research.” Journal of Early Intervention, vol. 15, no. 2, 1991, pp. 185–192., https://doi.org/10.1177/105381519101500207.
