= Don't Die: The Man Who Wants to Live Forever =

2025 documentary film

- Film poster
- Directed by: Chris Smith
- Produced by: Daniel Koehler; Chris Smith; Ashlee Vance
- Starring: Bryan Johnson
- Cinematography: Chris Smith
- Edited by: Daniel Koehler; Paul Trewartha
- Music by: Nick Chuba; Matt Cohen; Leopold Ross
- Production company: Library Films
- Distributed by: Netflix
- Release date: January 1, 2025
- Running time: 88 minutes
- Country: United States
- Language: English

Don't Die: The Man Who Wants to Live Forever is a 2025 American documentary film directed by Chris Smith and centered on Bryan Johnson, the technology entrepreneur known for his anti-aging regimen and self-experimentation. Produced by Smith for Library Films alongside Ashlee Vance and Daniel Koehler, the film was released on Netflix on January 1, 2025.

== Synopsis ==
The film follows Johnson's effort to slow or reverse aging through his "Project Blueprint" regimen, including his diet, exercise routine, supplements, medical monitoring, experimental treatments, and multigenerational plasma exchange involving his father Richard and his son Talmage. It also examines the effect of that pursuit on his public image, family relationships, and the broader discourse around longevity science.

== Production ==
Smith said the project began after he saw a headline about Johnson spending $2 million a year in an attempt to become 18 again. He then spent about 12 months following Johnson, documenting both his longevity experiments and their effect on those around him, while also interviewing experts about attempts to extend healthy human life.

== Reception ==
=== Critical response ===
On the review aggregator website Rotten Tomatoes, 75% of 16 critics' reviews are positive, with an average rating of 5.9/10. Metacritic, which uses a weighted average, assigned the film a score of 55 out of 100, based on seven critics, indicating "mixed or average" reviews.

Reviewing the film for RogerEbert.com, Nell Minow wrote that it raised worthwhile questions about aging, prevention, and the limits of Johnson's self-experimentation. Brent Simon of The A.V. Club described it as entertaining but argued that it avoided a more ambitious thematic approach. Bob Strauss of the San Francisco Chronicle wrote that the documentary humanized Johnson, while Nick Schager of The Daily Beast said that although the film complicated Johnson's self-presentation, it still risked being overly sympathetic to its subject. William Bibbiani of TheWrap wrote that the documentary gave too much credence to Johnson's claims and was overly sympathetic to its subject.

=== Accolades ===
The film received a nomination for the Cinema for Peace Dove for Global Health, Technology and Human Enhancement at the 2025 Cinema for Peace Awards.
