= Braintree (company) =

American company

- Type: Division
- Industry: Payment service provider
- Founded: 2007
- Founder: Bryan Johnson
- Headquarters: Chicago, Illinois, United States
- Areas served: US, Europe, Canada, Hong Kong, Singapore, Malaysia, Australia, New Zealand
- Key people: Dan Schulman (president and CEO, PayPal)
- Number of employees: 500+ (2016)
- Parent: eBay (2013–2014); PayPal (2014–present)
- Website: braintreepayments.com

Braintree is an American company that primarily deals in mobile and web payment systems for e-commerce companies. The company was acquired by PayPal on September 26, 2013.

== History ==
Braintree was founded by Bryan Johnson in 2007. By 2011, the company ranked 47th on Inc. magazine's annual list of the 500 fastest-growing companies.

In that year, Bill Ready joined the company as CEO. Johnson remained chairman.

In 2012, Braintree acquired Venmo for $26.2 million. A year later, PayPal, then part of eBay, acquired Braintree for $800 million. In August 2015, PayPal acquired Chicago-based mobile commerce company Modest and rolled Modest's products into Braintree's offerings.

Braintree first expanded internationally in 2012, when it announced that it would begin providing services in Australia. The company began serving Europe and Canada in August 2013 and announced support in Hong Kong, Singapore, and Malaysia in 2015.

By late 2015, Braintree was processing nearly $50 billion in authorized payment volume, up from $12 billion at the time it was acquired by PayPal, and had 154 million cards on file, up from 56.5 million.

In 2016, Braintree announced that it would enable its European merchants to begin accepting purchases via UnionPay, China's state-run card network.

As of 2022, Braintree processes payments in 45 countries and regions.

== Products and services ==
Braintree provides businesses with the ability to accept online and in-app payments. On October 1, 2012, it launched instant signup, streamlining the signup process for US merchants to a few minutes.

Braintree announced the v.zero SDK in July 2014. It allows the automatic integration of the shopping cart with PayPal, among other payment types. GitHub and ParkWhiz are among the companies that launched with the v.zero SDK, which supports 'One Touch Payments'. It does not require those users to create an account on an e-commerce site or enter credit card details every time they want to buy something. The concept of One Touch is based on a prior product called Venmo Touch, which was developed in conjunction with Venmo, the payment service Braintree bought in August 2012.

In September 2014, the company announced a partnership with Coinbase to accept Bitcoin.

== Integration ==
Braintree provides client libraries and integration examples in Ruby, Python, PHP, Java, .NET, and Node.js; mobile libraries for iOS and Android; and Braintree.js for in-browser card encryption.

Braintree also works with most e-commerce and billing platforms, including BigCommerce, WooCommerce, and Magento.

== Credit card data portability ==
Braintree initiated the credit card data portability standard in 2010, which was accepted as an official action group of the DataPortability project. Credit card data portability is supported by an opt-in community of electronic payment processing providers that agree to provide credit card data and associated customer information to an existing merchant upon request in a payment card industry (PCI) compliant manner.

== See also ==
- Payment service provider
- List of online payment service providers
