= N-of-1 trial =

Single patient clinical trial

An N-of-1 (N=1) trial is a multiple crossover clinical trial, conducted in a single patient. A trial in which random allocation is used to determine the order in which an experimental and a control intervention are given to a single patient is an N-of-1 randomized controlled trial. Some N-of-1 trials involve randomized assignment and blinding, but the order of experimental and control interventions can also be fixed by the researcher.

This type of study has enabled practitioners to achieve experimental progress without the work of designing a group comparison study. This design, especially if including blinding and wash-out periods, can be effective in confirming causality. N-of-1 trials, if used in clinical practice to inform therapeutic decisions concerned with the patient participating in the trial, can be a source of evidence about individual treatment responses, fulfilling the promise of personalized medicine.

== Design ==
The N-of-1 trials can be designed in many ways. For example, Single-Patient Open Trials (SPOTs) are located somewhere in between the formal (explanatory) N-of-1 trials and the trial and error approach used in clinical practice and are characterized by at least one crossover period with washout in between. One of the most common procedures is the ABA withdrawal experimental design, where the patient problem is measured before a treatment is introduced (baseline) and then measured again during the treatment and finally when the treatment has terminated. If the problem vanished during the treatment it can be established that the treatment was effective. But the N=1 study can also be executed in an AB quasi experimental way; such type-2 N-of-1 studies can be effective for testing treatments for severe, rare diseases when the expected effect of the intervention exceeds the effect size of confounders. Another variation is non-concurrent experimental design where different points in time are compared with one another. The standard approach to therapy choice, the trial and error method, may also be included in the N-of-1 design. This experimental design also has a problem with causality, whereby statistical significance under a frequentist paradigm may be un-interpretable but other methods, such as clinical significance or Bayesian methods should be considered.

Many consider this framework to be a proof of concept or hypothesis generating process to inform subsequent, larger clinical trials.

== List of variation in N-of-1 trial ==
Design	Causality	Use
A-B	Quasi experiment	Often the only possible method
A-A^{1}-A	Experiment	Placebo design where A is no drug and A^{1} is a placebo
A-B-A	Experiment	Withdrawal design where effects of B phase can be established
A-B-A-B	Experiment	Withdrawal design where effects of B phase can be established
A-B-A-B-A-B	Experiment	Withdrawal design where effects of B phase can be established
A-B^{1}-B^{2}-B^{3}-B^{n}-A	Experiment	Establishing the effect of different versions of B phase

Quasi experiment means that causality cannot be definitively demonstrated. Experiment means that it can be demonstrated.

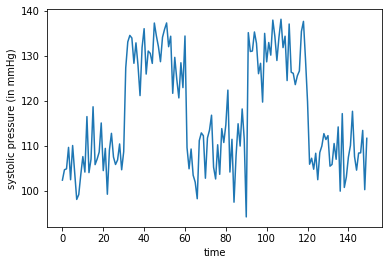
Plot of a synthetic dataset from an A-A^{1}-A N-of-1 trial: During day 1-30, day 61–90, and day 121–150, the participant is taking a drug developed to treat high blood pressure. They are taking a placebo in the remaining time. Normal systolic pressure is slightly below 120 (in mmHg).

== Examples ==
An N-of-1 trial is usually used to assess individual responses to treatments targeting chronic diseases. This design can be successfully implemented to determine optimal treatments for patients with diseases as diverse as osteoarthritis, chronic neuropathic pain and attention deficit hyperactivity disorder.

N-of-1 designs can also be observational and describe natural intra-individual changes in health-related behaviours or symptoms longitudinally. N-of-1 observational designs require complex statistical analysis of N-of-1 data however, a simple 10-step procedure is available. There has also been work to adapt causal inference counterfactual methods for using N-of-1 observational studies to design subsequent N-of-1 trials.

While N-of-1 trials are increasing, results of a recent systematic review found that statistical analyses in these studies would improve with more methodological and statistical rigor across all periods of the studies.

== The Quantified Self ==
With the cultural phenomenon of the quantified self a proliferation of personal experiments akin to N=1 is occurring, along with some detailed reports about them. This trend has been sparked in part by the growing ease of collecting data and analysing it, and also motivated by the ability of individuals to report such data easily.

A famous proponent and active experimenter was Seth Roberts, who reported on his self-experimental findings on his blog, and later published The Shangri-La Diet based on his conclusions from these self-experiments.

== Global networks ==
The International Collaborative Network for N-of-1 Trials and Single-Case Designs (ICN) is a global network for clinicians, researchers and consumers who have an interest in these methods. There are over 400 members of the ICN who are based in over 30 countries across the globe. The ICN was established in 2017 and is co-chaired by Jane Nikles and Suzanne McDonald.

== See also ==
- Applied behavior analysis – Application of respondent and operant conditioning to change behavior
- Anecdotal Evidence – Evidence relying on personal testimony
- B. F. Skinner – American psychologist and social philosopher (1904–1990)
- Single-subject design – Research design
- Crossover study – Research study in medicine
