= Responsible drug use =

Use of drugs in a responsible manner

Responsible drug use seeks to maximize the benefits and minimize the risks associated with psychoactive drug use. For illegal psychoactive drugs that are not diverted prescription controlled substances, some critics believe that illegal recreational drug use is inherently irresponsible, due to the unpredictable and unmonitored strength and purity of the drugs and the risks of addiction, infection, and other side effects.

Nevertheless, harm reduction advocates claim that the user can be responsible by employing the same general principles applicable to the use of alcohol: avoiding hazardous situations, excessive doses, and hazardous combinations of drugs; avoiding injection; and not using drugs at the same time as activities that may be unsafe without a sober state. Drug use can be thought of as an activity that is potentially beneficial but also potentially risky. Similar to other risky activities such as skydiving or mountain climbing, the varied risks of drug use can be minimized by using harm-reduction strategies such as education, caution, and common sense. These advocates also point out that government action (or inaction) makes responsible drug use more difficult by artificially increasing risks, such as by making drugs of known purity and strength unavailable due to prohibition.

== Harm reduction ==
A label on alcoholic drinks promoting zero alcohol during pregnancy

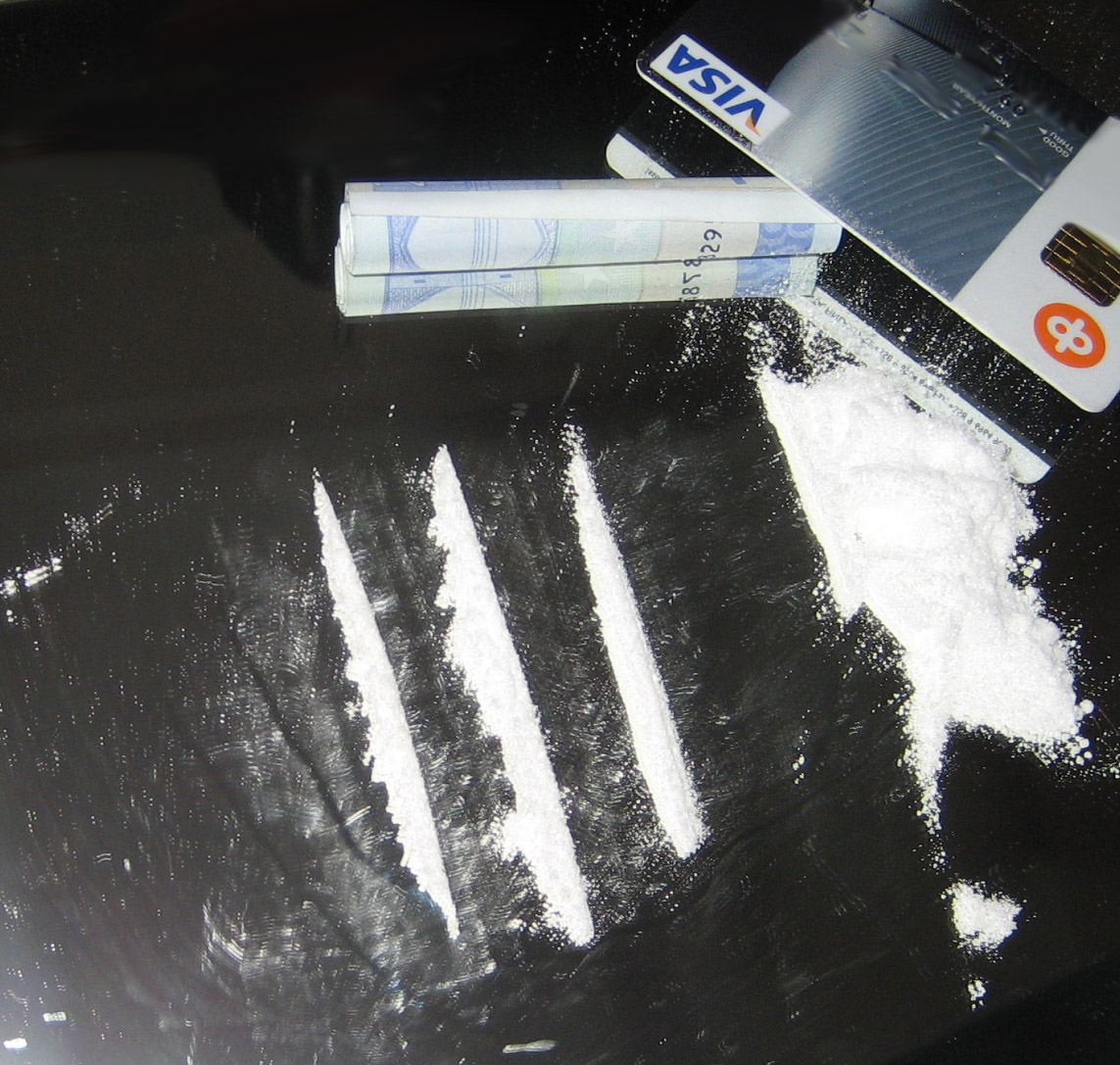
Contaminated currency such as banknotes frequently used for snorting should be avoided as they may spread hepatitis C.

Responsible drug use is emphasized as a primary prevention technique in harm-reduction drug policies. Harm-reduction policies were popularized in the late 1980s although they began in the 1970s counter-culture where cartoons were distributed to users explaining responsible drug use and consequences of irresponsible drug use.

Harm reduction as applied to drug use began as a philosophy in the 1980s aiming to minimize HIV transmission between intravenous drug users. It also focused on condom usage to prevent the transmission of HIV through sexual contact. Harm reduction worked so effectively that researchers and community policy makers adapted the theory to other diseases to which drug users were susceptible, such as Hepatitis C.

Professor Graham Foster, of St Mary's Hospital, London, said: "Sharing banknotes or straws is a significant risk factor that people need to be more aware of. Although the risk of contracting hepatitis C through snorting is lower than through sharing a needle, it is still there."

Harm reduction seeks to minimize the harms that can occur through the use of various drugs, whether legal (e.g. ethanol (alcohol), caffeine and nicotine), or illegal (e.g. heroin and cocaine). For example, people who inject drugs can minimize harm to both themselves and members of the community through proper injecting technique, using new sterile needles and syringes each time, utilizing sterile water, employing sterile micron filters to purify solutions, using antiseptic pads to prepare injection sites and clean drug mixing vials/containers, testing for contaminants, and through proper disposal of all injecting equipment.

Other harm reduction methods have been implemented with drugs such as crack cocaine. In some cities, peer health advocates (Weeks, 2006) have participated in passing out clean crack pipe mouthpiece tips to minimize the risk of Hepatitis A, B and C and HIV due to sharing pipes while lips and mouth contain open sores. Also, a study by Bonkovsky and Mehta reported that, just like shared needles, the sharing of straws used to "snort" cocaine can spread blood diseases such as Hepatitis C.

The responsible user therefore acts to minimize the spread of blood-borne viruses such as hepatitis C and HIV in the wider community and reduce their own risk exposure to drug-related harms.

=== Supervised injection sites (SiS) ===
The provision of supervised injection sites, also referred to as safe injection sites, operates under the premise of harm reduction by providing the injection drug user with a clean space and clean materials such as needles, sterile water, alcohol swabs, and other items used for safe injection.

Vancouver, British Columbia opened a SiS called Insite in its poorest neighbourhood, the Downtown Eastside. Insite was opened in 2003 and has dramatically reduced many harms associated with injection drug use. The research arm of the site, run by The Centre of Excellence for HIV/AIDS has found that SiS leads to increases in people entering detox and addiction treatment without increasing drug-related crime. As well, it reduces the littering of drug paraphernalia (e.g., used needles) on the street and reduces the number of people injecting in public areas. The program is attracting the highest-risk users, which has led to less needle-sharing in the Downtown Eastside community, and in the 453 overdoses which occurred at the facility, health care staff have saved every person.

Since the drug policy of the Netherlands considers substance use a social and health-related issue and not a legal one, the government has opened clinics where drug users may consume their substances in a safe, clean environment. Users are given access to clean needles and other paraphernalia, monitored by health officials and are given the ability to seek help from drug addiction.

Due to the project's initial success in reducing mortality ratios and viral spread amongst injection drug users, other projects have been started in Switzerland, Germany, Spain, Australia, Canada and Norway. France, Denmark and Portugal also opened multiple drug consumption facilities.

== Principles ==
Duncan and Gold argue that to use controlled and other drugs responsibly, a person must adhere to a list of principles. They and others argue that drug users ought to proceed by:

- understanding and educating oneself on the effects, risks, side effects and legal status of the drug they are taking
- measuring accurate dosages, and take other precautions to reduce the risk of overdose when taking drugs where an overdose is possible
- if possible, drug checking all substances before use to determine their purity and strength
- attempting to gain the most pure and high-quality drugs, laced with no cutting agent at best such as by buying on darknet markets
- using drugs only in relaxed and responsible social situations as altered consciousness can be inappropriate in potentially dangerous or unknown settings
- avoiding driving, operating heavy machinery, or otherwise situate themselves directly or indirectly responsible for the safety or care of another person while intoxicated and discouraging persons from operating a motor vehicle while intoxicated
- having a trip sitter (or "copilot") when taking hallucinogenic drugs
- having a hallucinogen antidote, or trip killer, available to stop bad trips with hallucinogenic drugs
- taking a small dose first when taking a new drug ("start low and go slow")
- taking the smallest dose of a recreational drug that will produce the desired effects
- using recreational drugs in moderation, setting reasonable limits on the consumption and not allowing drug use to overshadow other aspects of their life (i.e. financial and social responsibilities)
- avoiding mixing or combining drugs, especially unknown drugs and drugs with known dangerous interactions
- not trusting someone else with the responsibility for your health and safety
- knowing basic first-aid techniques and taking responsibility for applying them appropriately in cases of drug emergencies
- avoiding the injection of drugs; if injection cannot be avoided, then by using proper supplies like sterile needles, micron filters, and sterile water
- recognizing that one's own drug-taking behavior and attitudes in the presence of others will influence others, especially children
- abstaining from drug use when inappropriate for reasons of health and physical fitness such as during pregnancy
- respecting an individual's decision concerning drug use
- providing alternatives of acceptable social-recreational behaviors within a group for others and avoiding drug use to become the only motivation or focus of the social situation
- understanding the individuality of response
- being aware of the complex influences of set and setting on psychoactive drug experiences and acting accordingly

Some proposed ethical guidelines include:

- never tricking or trying to persuade anyone to use a drug
- encourage drug-free lifestyle to people with certain physical and mental conditions, including but not limited to: autism, cardiovascular and lung diseases, musculoskeletal and spinal diseases, epilepsy, cerebral palsy, schizophrenia; as well as genetical conditions, such as Down syndrome and Fragile X syndrome
- being morally conscious of the source of the drugs that a person is using

Duncan and Gold suggested that responsible drug use involves three areas of responsibility:

- Situation: concerns over the possible situations in which drugs might be used legally, such as the avoidance of hazardous situations; not using when alone; nor using due to coercion or when the use of drugs itself is the sole reason for use.
- Health: the avoidance of excessive doses or hazardous combinations of drugs; awareness of possible health consequences of drug use; avoiding drug-using behaviors that can potentially lead to addiction; and not using a drug recreationally during periods of excessive stress.
- Safety: using the smallest dose necessary to achieve the desired effects; using only in relaxed settings with supportive companions; avoiding the use of drugs by injection; and not using drugs while performing complex tasks or those where the drug might impair one's ability to function safely.

== Criticism and counterarguments ==
=== Health and social consequences ===
Drug use and users are often not considered socially acceptable; they are often marginalized socially and economically.

Drug use may affect work performance; however, drug testing should not be necessary if this is so, as a user's work performance would be observably deficient, and be grounds in itself for dismissal. In the case of discriminate use of substituted amphetamines and other stimulants, work capacity actually increases, which in itself raises additional ethical considerations.

=== Illegality ===
Illegality causes supply problems, and artificially raises prices far above the production and transportation costs. Purity and potency of many drugs is difficult to assess, as the drugs are illegal. Unscrupulous and unregulated middlemen are drawn by profit into the industry of these valuable commodities, directly affecting the users ability to obtain and use the drugs safely and forcing the user to take avoidable risks. Drug dosing with varying purity is problematic. Profit motivation rewards illegal sellers who dilute substances with a cutting agent; when a user, expecting a low dose, procures "uncut" drugs, an overdose can result.

The morality of buying certain illegal drugs is also questioned given that the trade in cocaine, for instance, has been estimated to cause 20,000 deaths a year in Colombia alone. Increasing Western demand for cocaine causes several hundred thousand people to be displaced from their homes every year, indigenous people are enslaved to produce cocaine and people are killed by the land mines drug cartels place to protect their coca crops. However, the majority of deaths currently caused by the illegal drug trade can only take place in a situation in which the drugs are illegal and some critics blame prohibition of drugs and not their consumption for the violence surrounding them. The illegality of drugs in itself may also cause social and economic consequences for those using them, and legal regulation of drug production and distribution could alleviate these and other dangers of illegal drug use.

=== At festivals ===
As drugs are very prevalent in festival culture more and more consider taking measures for responsible usage there. Some music festival organizers have chosen to provide services meant to inform about responsible drug use and drug checking for the disposal of dangerously laced ones. As a result, some have reported a significant reduction of the workload of festival's medics, welfare team and police officers.

== Organizations ==
Many organizations exist to promote responsible drug use and harm reduction throughout the world.

Some, such as Students for Sensible Drug Policy or Drug Policy Alliance, are primarily activist groups concerned with drug policy reform, promoting scientific research on drugs, and opposing stigma and misinformation about drug use and drug users. Others exist primarily as drug testing services for drug users (e.g. Energy Control or DrugsData), or as supervised injection services (e.g. Insite), or as informational sources (e.g. Bluelight or Erowid). Governments have begun to address responsible drug use within their respective jurisdictions. The U.S. Department of Health and Human Services addresses harm reduction through the Substance Abuse and Mental Health Services Administration as a part of the department's Overdose Prevention Strategy.

- Bluelight
- Erowid
- DanceSafe
- Drug Policy Alliance
- Harm Reduction International
- Insite
- Students for Sensible Drug Policy

== See also ==
- Cognitive liberty
- Counterfeit drug
- Drug checking
- Drug education
- Drug harmfulness
- Drug liberalization
- Drug policy
- Entheogen
- Harm reduction
- Psychonautics
- PsychonautWiki
- Reagent testing
- Straight edge
- Trip killer
