= Risks of psychedelic drugs =

Medical and social risks of drug use

Psychedelic drugs are a class of substances known to induce altered states of consciousness and perceptual changes. Scientific literature and public health reports identify a range of risks and adverse events associated with their use in both clinical and non-clinical settings. These risks vary by substance, dosage, and environment, and include toxicological complications (such as hyperthermia or cardiac risks), acute psychological reactions (bad trips), persistent mental health effects (including hallucinogen-induced psychotic disorder and hallucinogen persisting perception disorder), and social risks (including exploitation).

== Toxicological risks ==
Classic serotonergic psychedelics (psilocybin, LSD) are not physically addictive and have low physiological toxicity, but physical risks exist. MDMA can cause hyperthermia, arrhythmias, or serotonin syndrome. Ayahuasca, which contains an MAOI, can cause hypertensive crises or serotonin toxicity if combined with certain medications. Ibogaine carries known cardiac risks, including QT interval prolongation, and has been linked to fatal arrhythmias.

Ketamine, a dissociative anesthetic, has potential for dependence and abuse. Chronic, heavy ketamine use can cause severe urinary tract damage, known as "ketamine bladder syndrome," which has required bladder removal in some cases. Liver injury and cognitive impairments are also associated with chronic use.

Unregulated products on the black market pose significant risks. In 2024, a multi-state outbreak was linked to "Diamond Shruumz" branded chocolates. As of October 2024, at least 180 illnesses, 73 hospitalizations, and three suspected deaths were associated with the products. Lab tests found the products, advertised as containing psilocybin, in fact contained muscimol, 4-acetoxy-DMT, and pregabalin.

== Acute psychological reactions ==
A common risk of psychedelic use is acute adverse psychological reactions, known as "bad trips" or "challenging psychedelic experiences". These experiences can involve intense feelings of anxiety, panic, paranoia, and confusion. A 2023 Canadian national survey found 52% of respondents had experienced a challenging psychedelic trip. A 2016 study on psilocybin users found 39% rated their "bad trip" as among their most difficult life experiences, and 7.6% sought professional treatment for subsequent psychological symptoms. Common beliefs during "bad trips" include feeling overwhelmed, feeling afraid you will die, thinking you are in hell, fearing the trip will never end or that you will lose your mind, and believing other people are trying to harm you.

Many still attribute benefits to their "challenging psychedelic experiences", although these experiences of extreme fear can be dangerous if the user is not in a safe and contained environment. Because people's reality-testing capacities are compromised during psychedelic experiences, acute reactions can lead to dangerous and even life-threatening behavior. Indirect physical risks from impairment include falls, accidents, and drowning. In June 2023, a U.S. Army soldier experiencing a psilocybin-induced hallucination in Washington state opened fire at a music festival, killing two people and wounding three. Accidental deaths have also occurred from falls or wandering into danger. The 2023 death of actor Matthew Perry was attributed to ketamine-related drowning.

Emergency department (ED) visits related to hallucinogen use in California increased 69% between 2016 and 2021. Psilocybin exposure cases reported to U.S. poison control centers tripled in adults from 2019 to 2023. A 2023 survey by Rocky Mountain Poison & Drug Safety found 6% of respondents reported contemplating self-harm or harming others following a difficult episode.

== Persistent mental health effects ==
Assessing persistent mental health effects of psychedelic drugs raises some challenges. Public perception can be swayed by either very positive or very negative personal testimonials, which are probably outliers to the average user's experience. In addition, people with pre-existing mental or physical health problems may misattribute symptoms to a psychedelic drug experience. Nonetheless, emerging data does suggest somewhere between 9% and 30% of psychedelic drug users report some difficulties or challenges after taking psychedelic drugs, which they attribute to the drug. These difficulties can be transient, lasting just a few days, or chronic, lasting years. Symptoms can range from very mild to very severe, and in extreme cases can lead to suicidal ideation. A study of U.S. military veterans found 59% reported an adverse event, and 18% sought therapy for persistent psychological issues.

A 2023 study of 608 individuals with "extended difficulties" after a psychedelic experience found one-third reported persistence of symptoms for over one year, and one-sixth for over three years. Common issues included anxiety, derealization, existential confusion and social isolation. An international survey found 14% of respondents felt more anxious for an extended period following the ingestion of psychedelic drugs. Some people who experience very challenging psychedelic experiences (or 'bad trips') feel traumatized afterwards, and a few receive a diagnosis of PTSD. People can revisit trauma during psychedelic experiences, which can lead to retraumatization or destabilization, especially if they had no previous recollection of the early trauma and are left wondering if it really happened.

Hallucinogen persisting perception disorder (HPPD), characterized by persistent visual distortions, is a documented risk. A 2011 online survey found 4.2% of users reported lingering disturbances severe enough to consider seeking treatment, although other studies suggest it is much rarer. A 2020 global drug survey found 6% of LSD or psilocybin users had visual or cognitive distortions lasting more than one month, although not all users are disturbed by these symptoms.

Hallucinogen-induced psychotic disorder (HIPD) is a risk of serotonergic psychedelics. HIPD is a type of substance-induced psychosis. It occurs when hallucinations, delusions, paranoia, or a reduced ability to communicate occur after the drug has run its course. Psychedelics may precipitate psychotic breaks in predisposed individuals. The risk of psychedelic-induced psychosis has been found to be 0.002 to 0.6% in the general population in different studies and 3.8% in people with pre-existing schizophrenia or psychosis. While clinical trials and retreat centers typically screen out people with personal or family histories of psychosis or bipolar disorder, there are still cases of people having psychotic reactions to psychedelic drugs who had no previous history of psychosis. Those with substance-induced psychosis are more likely to have bipolar disorder or schizophrenia. Atypical antipsychotics are the recommended treatment for hallucinogen-induced psychotic disorder.

== Exploitation and social risks ==
Psychedelics can induce heightened suggestibility, creating vulnerability to harm or exploitation by others. In one survey of over 2000 people who had taken psychedelics, 13% said they had someone force sexual advances on them while they were under the influence. In another survey of 1221 users, 8% reported that they or someone they knew was the victim of inappropriate sexual contact by a psychedelic sitter, guide, or practitioner. In a 2015 incident in Canada, an unlicensed therapist named Richard Yensen inappropriately spooned a patient, Meaghan Buisson, during an MDMA-assisted therapy trial. After the trial, they entered a sexual relationship and Buisson later alleged misconduct and sexual assault. The trial incident, which included video evidence, led Health Canada to temporarily halt the trials. An investigation by New York magazine, "Cover Story: Power Trip," documented numerous allegations of sexual misconduct in psychedelic therapy.

Historically, some cults have used psychedelics for control. The Manson Family in the 1960s used LSD to 'brainwash' members. The Family cult in Australia administered LSD to children as part of indoctrination. Aum Shinrikyo in Japan administered large quantities of LSD for member initiation rites.

== Mitigation of risks ==
Some of these risks emerge because psychedelic drugs are illegal in most parts of the world. The unregulated environment resulting from this illegality leads to a lack of transparency regarding drug purity and composition, and the credentials of those facilitating the drugs' use. The associated stigma and fear of legal consequences can also cause fear during the psychedelic experience or a reluctance to report harm after it.

Risks of adverse events are lower in legal, medical, clinical settings, and some psychedelic research centres report hardly any serious adverse events. However, a 2022 systematic review found adverse effects were not systematically assessed in many studies. An investigation into Esketamine (a Ketamine derivative) trials found 40% of serious adverse events and 39% of non-serious adverse events were omitted from published reports.

Harm reduction strategies include education on preparation, dose, and the importance of a safe setting with a sober sitter. Screening for psychiatric history, especially psychosis or bipolar disorder, is advised.

Challenging psychedelic experiences and post-psychedelic difficulties appear to be more likely to occur if people take psychedelics on their own or without psychological guidance, if they are under 25, if they take a high dose or multiple drugs together, if they have a pre-existing psychological condition, and if they have a neurotic personality type which struggles with surrendering to experiences. Good preparation before the experience and support afterwards (including professional support) reduces risks.

Public health messaging is important to balance over-optimistic or over-pessimistic media narratives. In October 2025, the UK government launched a campaign warning about the dangers of ketamine. Clinical trial administrators are being called upon to improve adverse event monitoring and transparency. Support services have also emerged including psychedelic support hotline, clinics specialising in post-psychedelic crises, and peer support groups for people experiencing post-psychedelic difficulties.

== See also ==
- Challenging Psychedelic Experiences Project
- Psychedelic syndrome
