= Huson =

Huson is a surname. Notable people with the surname include:

- Dave Huson (born 1951), Jersey soccer player
- Hobart Huson, American writer
- Jeff Huson (born 1964), American baseball player
- Paul Huson (born 1942), English writer

== See also ==
- Henry H. Huson House and Water Tower, house in Plymouth, Wisconsin, United States
