= CPEP =

CPEP may refer to:

- Center for Preservation Education and Planning, a collaboration with the United States' National Trust for Historic Preservation
- Challenging Psychedelic Experiences Project, a research project on difficult psychedelic experiences or "bad trips"
- Colombo Harbour Expansion Project, a port expansion project in Sri Lanka
- Comité-directeur de la Caisse de Pension des Employés Privés, the largest private-sector pension fund of Luxembourg
- Committee on Printed and Electronic Publications, a committee at the International Union of Pure and Applied Chemistry
- Communist Party of East Pakistan, a political party in Pakistan
- Contemporary Physics Education Project at the University of Michigan
- Comprehensive Psychiatric Emergency Program, a standard of Psychiatric Emergency rooms
- Computer Professional Education Program, an education program at the Australian Computer Society
