= Drug education =

Provision of information for proper usage of drugs

Drug education is the planned provision of information, guidelines, resources, and skills relevant to living in a world where psychoactive substances are widely available and commonly used for a variety of both medical and non-medical purposes, some of which may lead to harms such as overdose, injury, infectious disease (such as HIV or hepatitis C), or addiction. The two primary approaches to drug education are harm-reduction education and abstinence-based education.

== Abstinence-based drug education ==
Abstinence-based drug education began with the anti-alcohol "temperance education" programmes of the Woman's Christian Temperance Union in the United States and Canada in the late 19th century. In many respects, the WCTU's progressive education agenda set the template for much of what has been done since in the name of drug education.

Abstinence-based education programs aim to inform adolescents of illicit drug use in an effort to prevent illegal drug use while highlighting the dangers of problematic substance use and strongly emphasizing abstinence.

Many studies have found that school-based abstinence education programs such as D.A.R.E. did not lead to a reduction in substance use, and one study discovered that suburban students who went through the D.A.R.E. program were actually significantly more likely to engage in drug use.

The Australian Government has implemented a range of drug education programs through the National Drug Education Strategy (NDES) by providing schools with effective drug education programs. The program aims to manage drug related issues and incidents within schools. The Australian Government Department of Health's Positive Choices portal, released in response to a National Ice Taskforce report, facilitates access to interactive evidence-based drug education resources and prevention programs for school communities. It builds on existing drug education resources developed by researchers at the National Drug and Alcohol Research Centre such as the Climate Schools (now called OurFutures ) programs that have been proven to reduce alcohol and drug related harms and increase student well-being.

In addition to government-funded programs, a number of not-for-profit organisations such as Life Education Australia provide drug education programs to adolescents. These preventative programs aim to deliver a progressive approach that will motivate and encourage young people to make positive decisions in life. Emphasis within these programs is also placed in focusing on deterring peer pressure as a means of empowering adolescents and promoting autonomy. This approach reaches 750,000 primary and secondary students in Australia each year.

The prevalence of abstinence-based programs declined throughout the early 21st-century following an uptick in substance use and the rise of the opioid epidemic. School-based drug education programs have declined alongside it. In a 2021 survey, only 60% of American 12-17 year-olds reported seeing drug and alcohol preventing messaging in school.

=== D.A.R.E. ===
D.A.R.E. (Drug Abuse Resistance Education) is a program in the United States implemented in 5th grade school classrooms to educate students on the effects of drugs and temptations they may encounter, particularly in later education. The police officers who administer the program can also serve as community models for students. There is no scientific evidence that preventive drug education such as D.A.R.E. is effective, and some evidence that it may actually increase substance use rates in suburban teenagers.

== Harm reduction-based education ==
Harm reduction education emerged as an alternative to abstinence-based education in the late 20th-century and early 21st-century. Rather than encouraging complete abstinence and aiming to completely eradicate drug use in society, harm reduction education accepts that drug use is inevitable in modern society. It aims to reduce the harms associated with drug use by providing individuals with comprehensive information about the nature of substance use. Harm reduction education aims to improve health, social, and economic measurements rather than aiming primarily to reduce the rate of drug consumption.

In the late 1990s and early 2000s, websites dedicated to harm reduction education such as the educational database Erowid and the harm reduction forum Bluelight emerged. Erowid hosts information about hundreds of psychoactive plants and substances, while Bluelight is an online forum on which users discuss harm reduction and drug use. Both sites collectively host about 100,000 experience reports.

By the early 2020s, many organizations such as the US government's SAMHSA had shifted from abstinence-based education to harm reduction-based education.

== Effectiveness ==
A systematic review of abstinence-based school drug education published in 2003 found mixed results on its effectiveness.

Many studies conducted in the early 2000s found that school-based abstinence education programs such as D.A.R.E. did not lead to a reduction in substance use, and one study concluded that suburban students who went through the D.A.R.E. program were actually significantly more likely to engage in drug use.

A 2012 study published in the journal of Drugs: Education, Prevention and Policy came to the conclusion that students aged 13 to 15 who completed a drug and alcohol prevention program were less likely to develop a drug or alcohol problem.

== Drug education campaigns and programs ==
Drug education can also occur through public campaigns rather than education programs. Examples include advertising campaigns focused on raising awareness such as the UK Government's FRANK campaign or the US "media campaign". In efforts to prevent substance abuse, drug education may counter-productively perpetuate myths and stereotypes about psychoactive substances and people who use them.

Indirect drug education programs such as the UK government's Positive Futures Program may utilize activities such as sports and the arts to indirectly steer young people away from drug use. These programs aim to engage young people by relating to them and putting them in contact with positive role models (coaches/trained youth workers). After building a trusting relationship with a young person, these role models can gradually change attitudes towards drug use and steer the young person back into education, training and employment. This approach reaches young people who have dropped out of mainstream education. It also benefits local communities by reducing crime and anti-social behaviour.

== Future improvements ==
Past research into drug education has indicated that effective drug education must involve engaging, interactive learning strategies that stimulate higher-order thinking, promote learning and be transferable to real life circumstances.

Studies on school-based programs indicated that professional training and support may be required to increase the effectiveness of teaching staff and the uniform implementation of drug curriculum.

A study in 2017 on youth-targeted harm reduction education found that effective harm reduction programming must utilize relatable and meaningful approaches and be connected to youth's lived experience.

== See also ==
- Alcohol education
- Harm reduction
- PsychonautWiki
- Responsible drug use
