= Bad trip =

Unpleasant experience triggered by psychoactive drugs

A bad trip (also known as acute intoxication from hallucinogens, psychedelic crisis, or emergence phenomenon) is an acute adverse psychological reaction to the effects of psychoactive substances, namely psychedelics. There is no clear definition of what constitutes a bad trip. Additionally, knowledge on the cause of bad trips and who may be vulnerable to such experiences are limited. Existing studies report that possible adverse reactions include anxiety, panic, depersonalization, ego dissolution, paranoia, as well as physiological symptoms such as dizziness and heart palpitations. However, most studies indicate that the set and setting of substance use influence how people respond. According to the California Legislature's 1969 substance abuse guide, the term "freak-out" was used to refer to a bad trip during the 1960s.

Bad trips can be exacerbated by the inexperience or irresponsibility of the user or the lack of proper preparation and environment for the trip, and are often reflective of unresolved psychological tensions triggered during the course of the experience. In clinical research settings, precautions including the screening and preparation of participants, the training of the session monitors who will be present during the experience, and the selection of appropriate physical setting can minimize the likelihood of psychological distress. Researchers have suggested that the presence of professional "trip sitters" (i.e., session monitors) may significantly reduce the negative experiences associated with a bad trip. In most cases in which anxiety arises during a supervised psychedelic experience, reassurance from the session monitor is adequate to resolve it; however, if distress becomes intense it can be treated pharmacologically, for example with the benzodiazepine diazepam.

The psychiatrist Stanislav Grof wrote that unpleasant psychedelic experiences are not necessarily unhealthy or undesirable, arguing that they may have the potential for psychological healing and lead to breakthrough and resolution of unresolved psychic issues. Drawing on narrative theory, the authors of a 2021 study of 50 users of psychedelics found that many described bad trips as having been sources of insight or even turning points in life.

While some users report benefits, a challenging psychedelic experience can lead to long-term negative consequences, particularly if the individual lacks proper support. A portion of users report being psychologically traumatized afterwards, and some have been diagnosed with PTSD following a particularly difficult trip. In one survey, 9% of users reported difficulties lasting at least 24 hours after the trip itself. In another survey of 608 people who all reported post-psychedelic difficulties, one-third of the dataset said the difficulties lasted longer than a year, and one-fifth said the difficulties lasted longer than three years. The most commonly-reported post-psychedelic difficulties in this study were anxiety, feeling traumatized by the experience or uncovering earlier trauma, social isolation, derealization/depersonalization, visual distortions, and existential confusion. Most people recover from these difficulties with the help of accurate information, social support, and therapy.

== Signs and symptoms ==
With proper screening, preparation, and support in a regulated setting symptoms are usually benign. A bad trip on psilocybin, for instance, often features intense anxiety, confusion, agitation, and psychosis. They manifest as a range of feelings, such as anxiety, paranoia, the unshakeable sense of one's inevitable and imminent personal demise or states of unrelieved terror that they believe will persist after the substance's effects have worn off. As of 2011, exact data on the frequency of bad trips are not available.

== Treatment ==
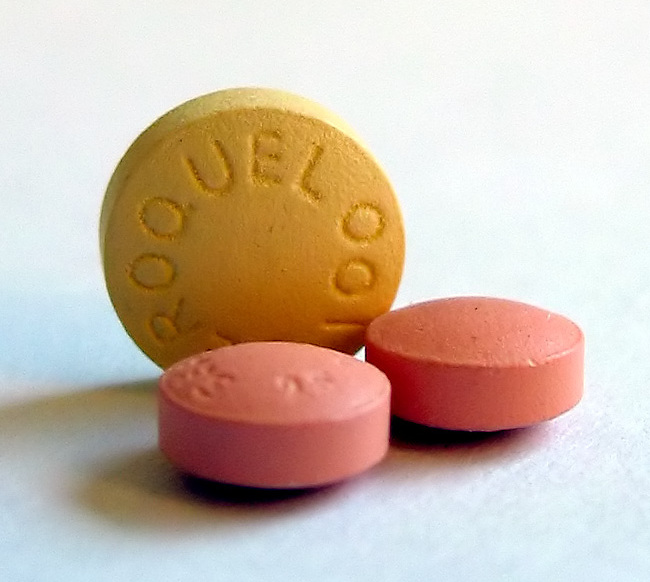
Seroquel (quetiapine) is an antipsychotic used as a trip killer.

Medical treatment consists of supportive therapy and minimization of external stimuli. In some cases, sedation is used when necessary to control self-destructive behavior, or when hyperthermia occurs. A trip killer such as alprazolam, diazepam, quetiapine, or trazodone is the most frequently used treatment. Other benzodiazepines such as lorazepam are also effective. Benzodiazepines decrease fear and anxiety, but will not subdue hallucinations. Antipsychotics such as quetiapine, olanzapine, risperidone, and haloperidol can reduce or stop hallucinations. Haloperidol is effective against acute intoxication caused by LSD and other tryptamines, amphetamines, ketamine, and phencyclidine.

== Perspectives ==
=== Stanislav Grof ===
Psychiatrist Stanislav Grof once said in an interview:

There is a tremendous danger of confusing the inner world with the outer world, so you'll be dealing with your inner realities but at the same time you are not even aware of what's happening, You perceive a sort of distortion of the world out there. So you can end up in a situation where you're weakening the resistances, your conscious is becoming more aware, but you're not really in touch with it properly, you're not really fully experiencing what's there, not seeing it for what it is. You get kind of deluded and caught into this.

In a 1975 book, Grof suggested that painful and difficult experiences during a trip could be a result of the mind reliving experiences associated with birth, and that experiences of imprisonment, eschatological terror, or suffering far beyond anything imaginable in a normal state, if seen through to conclusion, often resolve into emotional, intellectual and spiritual breakthroughs. From this perspective, Grof suggests that interrupting a bad trip, while initially seen as beneficial, could potentially trap the tripper in unresolved psychological states. Grof also suggests that many cathartic experiences within psychedelic states, while not necessarily crises, may be the effects of consciousness entering a perinatal space.

=== Rick Strassman ===
Professor of psychiatry Rick Strassman is critical of reframing the experience of bad trips as one of "challenging experiences".

== History ==
The earliest known psychedelic bad trip is John Raleigh Briggs's experience with a small dose of peyote published in 1887.

== See also ==
- Altered state of consciousness
- Challenging Psychedelic Experiences Project
- Ego death
- Existential crisis
- Hallucinogen
- Hallucinogen-induced psychotic disorder
- Hallucinogen persisting perception disorder
- Harm reduction
- Near-death experience
- Out-of-body experience
- Overdose
- Posttraumatic growth
- Posttraumatic stress disorder
- Psychedelic experience
- Psychedelic syndrome
- Psychedelic therapy
- Psychedelic drug
- Risks of psychedelic drugs
- Psychonautics
- Psychosis
- Recreational drug use
- Responsible drug use
- Sensory deprivation
- Set and setting
- Spiritual crisis
- Substance-induced psychosis
- Trip killer
