= Aubri Esters =

American activist (1985–2020)

- Born: May 11, 1985; Beverly, Massachusetts, US
- Died: June 4, 2020 (aged 35); Boston, Massachusetts, US
- Cause of death: Drug overdose
- Education: Massachusetts College of Art and Design
- Years active: 2006–2020
- Organization: SIFMA Now!
- Movement: Harm reduction

Aubri Esters (May 11, 1985 – June 4, 2020) was an American activist for the rights of drug users.

== Early life ==
Esters was born in Beverly, Massachusetts, to mental health counselor Laura Pelkus-Esters and clinical psychologist Joshua Peter Esters.

In her late teens, Esters transitioned and legally changed her name to Aubri. Coming out as a transgender woman caused Esters to lose close relationships, but drove her passion for activism. Esters' sister, Cheraya, who is also queer, credits Esters with giving her the safety and strength to come out.

Esters lived with fibromyalgia and a heart condition. She used a walker.

Esters was a drummer. She studied interrelated media at MassArt.

When she was 18, Esters began using drugs. After a couple of years, Esters was spending up to $300 daily on her drug use and suffered from abscesses. Esters experienced homelessness and said she benefited from services available at Long Island. For over a decade, Esters used methadone to treat chaotic opioid use.

== Activism ==
Esters spoke about herself as a "person who happens to use drugs." She taught medical practitioners and politicians about the challenges of life on the streets and the discrimination and abuse she and other people who use drugs faced. Esters always carried Narcan and saved many people's lives from drug overdose. Esters lost friends to fatal overdose, many of which she witnessed. She urged the state to recognize thousands of lives "wasted" due to preventable overdose.

After learning about the use of fentanyl test strips in Canada, she helped bring them to harm reduction organizations in Boston.

In 2016, Esters was on the winning team of a hackathon seeking methods to prevent drug addiction and deaths. Esters' team presented the idea of a mobile van that would visit neighborhoods known for drug-use in Boston. Staff would distribute sterile needles and provide counseling and two-days worth of Suboxone.

Before she died, Esters was planning to work with Miriam Harris, an addiction medicine fellow at Boston Medical Center, on a study that would determine how the COVID-19 pandemic has impacted people who use drugs.

Esters was an organizer with the Boston Homeless Solidarity Committee (BHSC).

Esters advocated for people who use drugs in policy conversations with local government officials. She cofounded SIF MA, a group that promoted safe consumption sites. In 2018, she was a representative on the Massachusetts Harm Reduction Commission, where she urged the state to launch a pilot for supervised injection sites. The pilot gained support from the Massachusetts Medical Society.

In 2019, at a Harm Reduction Commission meeting, Esters interrupted Boston mayor Marty Walsh and said "I'm sorry, this is personal, my people are dying!"

In 2019, Esters spoke to the Massachusetts Legislature about safe injection sites.

== Death ==
On June 4, 2020, Esters was found dead, after her mother could not get ahold of her and requested a wellness check be carried out by law enforcement at Esters' apartment in Mass and Cass, near BMC. Esters died days after returning from spending three months with her mother in Florida. Months prior to her death, Esters said isolation in the COVID-19 pandemic was killing people who use drugs. Jess Tilley, executive director of New England Users Union, said of Esters, "We've lost one of our strongest champions in her prime." Boston mayor Marty Walsh publicly shared sadness over Esters' death, and credited Esters with changing his perspective on policies regarding substance use.

=== Posthumous dedications ===
On June 18, 2020, Congresswoman Ayanna Pressley introduced a congressional record statement remembering and honoring the life of Aubri Esters. "Aubri's Law", a bill that would permit the creation of supervised injection facilities in Massachusetts, was named for Esters.
