= World Federation Against Drugs =

Anti-drugs group

The World Federation Against Drugs (WFAD) is a group of individuals and non-governmental organizations from different parts of the world (139 organizations in 47 countries in July 2015). The 1st World Forum Against Drugs was hosted in Sweden in 2008 by a group of Swedish non-Government organizations. An outcome of the first forum was the founding of WFAD in 2009 and to organize the 2nd World Forum Against Drugs in 2010. The start of WFAD had, in 2009, moral support from the US President George W Bush

The aim of WFAD is to work toward a "drug-free" world. The members of WFAD believe that illicit drug use is threatening the existence of stable families, communities and government institutions throughout the world. WFAD has its head office in Stockholm. WFAD opposes legalization of cannabis and other recreational drugs, and opposes injection rooms for heroin addicts. WFAD advocates that nations adhere to the Single Convention on Narcotic Drugs 1961.

The WFAD organized, in 2012, the World Forum Against Drugs One of many key speakers at the 3rd World Forums Against Drugs was R. Gil Kerlikowske, U.S. President Barack Obama's "drug czar". At the 3rd World Forum Against Drugs in Stockholm May 2012 was a declaration "for a humane and balanced drug policy" signed by him as representative of the U.S. Government along with representatives of Italy, the Russian Federation, Sweden and the United Kingdom.

WFAD continue to organize international conferences about drug policy.

== Opposition to harm reduction measures ==
In 2008, the World Federation Against Drugs stated that "some organizations and local governments actively advocate the legalization of drugs and promote policies such as "harm reduction" that accept drug use and do not help people who use substances to become free from substance use. This undermines the international efforts to limit the supply of and demand for drugs." The Federation states that harm reduction efforts often end up being "drug legalization or other inappropriate relaxation efforts, a policy approach that violates the UN Conventions."
