= Erowid =

Nonprofit educational organization

Erowid Center
- Formation: 1995 (31 years ago)
- Founders: Fire Erowid; Earth Erowid
- Founded at: United States
- Type: 501(c)(3)
- Tax ID no.: 20-3256212
- Purpose: Drug information and drug education
- Region served: Worldwide
- Members: c. 2,000
- Key people: Fire Erowid, (Executive Director); Earth Erowid, (Technical Director)
- Affiliations: Bluelight.org; Multidisciplinary Association for Psychedelic Studies
- Website: erowid.org
- Remarks: Over 90,000 unique visitors per day

Erowid, also called Erowid Center, is a non-profit educational organization that provides information about psychoactive plants and chemicals.

Erowid documents legal and illegal substances, including their intended and adverse effects. Information on Erowid's website is gathered from diverse sources including published literature, experts in related fields, and the experiences of the general public. Erowid acts as a publisher of new information as well as a library for the collection of documents and images published elsewhere.

== History ==
Erowid was founded in April 1995 as a small business with their website being published six months later. The name "Erowid" was chosen to reflect the organization's stated philosophy of education. Using Proto-Indo-European linguistic roots, "Erowid" roughly translates into "Earth Wisdom" (*h₁er-, *weyd-).

In 2005, the 501(c)(3) non-profit educational organization, "Erowid Center", was formed. The organization is supported by donations, and its website is free of advertisements. Although its primary focus is on the website, Erowid Center also provides research and data for other harm reduction, health, and educational organizations. The organization is based in Northern California.

Fire Erowid and Earth Erowid are the sobriquets of the two creators of the site. Both work full-time on the project, along with speaking at conferences, producing original research, and contributing to entheogenic research. According to the site, the creators' vision includes a "world where people treat psychoactives with respect and awareness; where people work together to collect and share knowledge in ways that strengthen their understanding of themselves, and provide insight into the complex choices faced by individuals and societies alike."

Erowid Center's mission is to provide and facilitate access to objective, accurate, and non-judgmental information about psychoactive plants, chemicals, technologies, and related issues. According to one study, "Erowid is a trusted resource for drug information—both positive and negative," and Erowid has been extensively cited worldwide by book authors, scientific and medical journals, newspapers, magazines, filmmakers, radio and TV shows, Ph.D. students, web sites, and other media producers.

== Projects ==
=== Online library ===
The library contains over 63,000 documents related to over 737 psychoactive substances, including images, research summaries and abstracts, FAQs, media articles, experience reports, information on chemistry, dosage, effects, law, health, traditional and spiritual use, and drug testing. As of July 2014, over 17 million people visit the site each year.

The site generally contains more detail in the pages listed under plants and chemicals than in other sections. It does not have comprehensive information about the specific effects of most pharmaceuticals. Such information may appear elsewhere on the site, where one can read about people's individual reactions to various drugs.

=== Experience Vaults ===
Erowid allows site visitors to submit descriptions of their own personal experiences with psychoactive substances for review and possible publication. The site states that they welcome all perspectives regarding personal psychoactive experience, including positive, negative, and neutral. Their collection consists of more than 30,000 edited, reviewed, and published reports, as well as stating that they have another 55,000 unpublished reports undergoing review. Many of their reports are collected from Bluelight.org, and the two organizations have collaborated to categorize and publish trip reports.

=== DrugsData ===
Erowid also runs DrugsData (formerly EcstasyData), an independent laboratory drug checking program co-sponsored by IsomerDesign and DanceSafe.

Launched in July 2001 under the name EcstasyData, its purpose was to collect ecstasy pill samples sent anonymously by the public, in order to manage, review, and publicly report laboratory test results from a variety of organizations As the site evolved into DrugsData, the service expanded to testing samples of most recreational drugs, and publicly report the sample's chemical composition as well as what it was sold as.

As of April 10, 2024, DrugsData's service is on administrative pause until further notice, by order of the DEA. DrugsData has published test results for over 20,000 samples throughout its 23 years of service.

Testing costs have sometimes been covered by project funding (when available) and at other times are covered by those who submit tablets for testing. Multiple published studies use EcstasyData.org as a primary source of data.

Tablets of street ecstasy can be anonymously submitted to a DEA licensed laboratory for testing and then photos of the tablets and GC/MS test results are published on the project's website.

=== Erowid Extracts ===
Erowid Extracts, the bi-annual members' newsletter of Erowid, has been published each year since 2001. It provides updates on the organization's activities, results of surveys conducted on Erowid.org, experience reports, new articles on various aspects of psychedelic and psychoactive plants and drugs, and information about psychedelic culture and events. New issues of Erowid Extracts are sent to members, but past issues are available on the Erowid website.

=== Psychoactive Reference Library ===
Erowid and The Multidisciplinary Association for Psychedelic Studies (MAPS) collaborated on two large reference database projects. Erowid has provided expertise and work developing and coordinating the construction of an online psychoactive drug reference library, and MAPS has published a similar collection

=== Document archiving ===
Erowid Center also archives and provides access to thousands of older texts in their online and physical libraries. By collecting and making these texts available, they attempt to promote an understanding of the changing contexts surrounding the use of psychoactive drugs. Major archiving projects include the Albert Hofmann collection, the Myron Stolaroff Collection, documents from Alexander Shulgin, and a complete archived snapshot of The Hive.

== Reception ==
Due to the subject matter presented on Erowid.org, the site has drawn praise and criticism from both the media and medical officials. Edward Boyer, an emergency-room physician and toxicologist, while admitting that Erowid has a plethora of useful information, once argued the site may cause more harm than good to potential drug users.

Anthropologist Nicolas Langlitz argued that Erowid also sometimes serves as a mechanism of postmarket surveillance or pharmacovigilance in the realm of illicit and experimental substances.

== See also ==
- The Hive (website)
- Drug rehabilitation
- PsychonautWiki
- Responsible drug use
