= Trip sitter =

Person who remains sober to ensure the safety of a drug user

A trip sitter—sometimes known as a sober sitter, spotter, or co-pilot—is a term used by recreational or spiritual drug users to describe a person who remains sober to ensure the safety of the drug user while they are under the influence of a drug; they are especially common with first-time experiences or when using hallucinogens such as psychedelics, dissociatives, and deliriants. This practice can be seen as a means of harm reduction.

A trip sitter is sometimes called a psychedelic guide or guide, although this term is more often used to describe someone who takes an active role in guiding a drug user's experiences; a sitter merely stands by to discourage bad trips and handle emergencies, but otherwise does not take on an active role. Guides are more common among spiritual users of entheogens. Psychedelic guides were strongly encouraged by Timothy Leary and the other authors of The Psychedelic Experience: A Manual Based on the Tibetan Book of the Dead.^{[7]} Trip sitters are also mentioned in the Responsible Drug User's Oath.

Some sources recommend a sitter be present when certain drugs are used, regardless of the user's experience or comfort with the substance. A sitter may be necessary for users of Salvia divinorum for example because the drug can sometimes cause both disorientation and a desire to move about.

While the presence of a responsible, knowledgeable trip sitter or guide will reduce the risks of drug use, it is not a guarantee that a bad trip will not occur, nor that the drug user will remain free of physical or mental harm.

== Who trip-sits ==
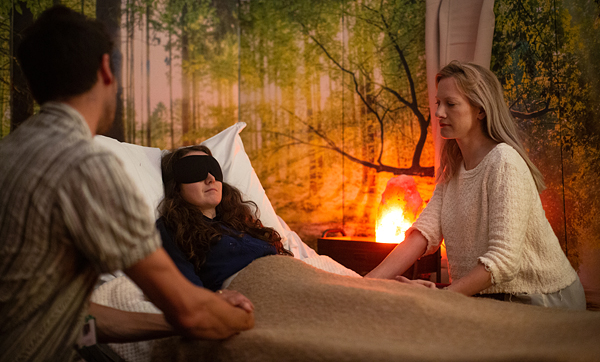
Professional trip sitters in a psychedelic research environment

In some cases, a trip sitter may be a medical professional, such as the nurses used in psychedelic research or a therapist who performs psychedelic psychotherapy. Sometimes, a tripper will ask another, more experienced user to sit for them. However, the most common trip sitter is a friend or family member whom the drug user trusts.^{[1]}

Although an ideal sitter is one who is both personally experienced with the substance being used, as well as one trained to deal with any potential psychological or medical crisis that may arise, arguably the most important qualities may be the willingness to help, the responsibility needed to stay sober enough to be fully present, and the ability to be relaxed, accepting, and not interfere with the experience beyond the wishes of the user. A sitter should be willing to research the substance in question, and understand when to call for professional medical assistance.^{[1]}

Especially when using a short-acting substance such as smoked DMT or Salvia divinorum, it may be possible for two people to take turns, with one being the sitter while the other takes the psychedelic.

== Common duties ==
A responsible trip sitter assists a drug user before, during, and after their experience; it is their responsibility to help the user by making sure they drink enough water, assisting them in moving around when needed, and generally doing whatever necessary to ensure their comfort throughout the trip.^{[1]}^{[2]}

=== Before use ===
The responsible trip sitter will thoroughly research the substance which will be ingested (as well as the users) in order to answer all potential questions the user may have, and to prepare for any potential crisis situations it may cause. They may have first hand experience of the drug beforehand, but this is not required, with a number of sitters choosing to the culture but not the chemical. The sitter will discuss this research in detail with the user; it is also considered important to talk to the user about any ground rules for the session, how to handle any emergencies that may arise, and what, if any, guidance will be wanted during the trip.^{[1]}^{[2]} A trip sitter will also frequently help a drug user create a healthy set and setting for the experience. They do this by making sure the user's surroundings are comfortable and orderly, adjusting lighting, temperature, and music (if any) to suit the desired tone of the trip, and overall doing whatever they can to maximize the user's openness to the experience and minimize their fear.^{[1]}^{[2]}^{[7]}

=== During the psychedelic experience ===
A sitter typically remains present for the entire experience. In some cases, they may actively guide the experience of the user by adjusting their environment or through guided meditation or visualization. In other cases, they stay uninvolved except when the user has questions, fears, or needs for which the sitter can provide (such as making sure the user drinks enough water). Assistance in facing fears may be especially necessary if the experience turns into a bad trip.^{[1]}^{[2]}^{[4]}^{[5]}^{[7]} In order to maintain the immediate well-being of the drug user, it is important for the sitter to know what situations they can or cannot handle on their own, and when to call for professional medical assistance.^{[6]} The sitter may administer antipsychotic and benzodiazepine trip killers to stop the trip if necessary.

Although the sitter may be called upon to intervene during a difficult situation, bad trip, or medical crisis, the mere presence of a caring sitter is often enough to keep a user comfortable and even enable deeper exploration of the drug's effects.^{[1]} The experience of being present during an especially powerful experience, such as when the user reaches new insight into themselves or their beliefs about the nature of the universe, is reportedly quite rewarding.^{[7]}

=== After the trip ===
A sitter may help the drug user to integrate or understand their experiences when the experience is complete. Just as they did before, and during the trip, they may reassure the user about any fears or worries that have occurred. This discussion may take place immediately after the drug's effects have worn off, or they may wait until a later date.^{[1]}^{[2]}

== Online services ==
The chatroom TripSit, where volunteers offer guidance to people having bad drug experiences, attempts to fulfill a similar function.

== See also ==
- Designated driver
- Hallucinogen
- Altered state of consciousness
- Recreational drug use
- Psychedelic therapy
- Psychonautics
- Sensory deprivation
- Spotter
- Responsible drug use
- Drug harmfulness
- Drug overdose
- Supervised injection site
- Crisis hotline
- Trip killer
