= Challenging Psychedelic Experiences Project =

- Founder: Jules Evans
- Established: September 2022
- Website: challengingpsychedelicexperiences.com ecstaticintegration.org

The Challenging Psychedelic Experiences Project (CPEP) is a research project studying challenging experiences (also known colloquially as "bad trips") with psychedelic drugs. One of the aims of the project is harm reduction.

== History ==
The founder and director of the project is researcher and journalist Jules Evans. When he was 18 years old in the 1990s, Evans had a very bad LSD trip that resulted in mental health difficulties that lasted for years, which later inspired him to found the project. Evans also runs an online peer support group for people who have had difficult psychedelic experiences as well as a prominent newsletter called Ecstatic Integration.

The Challenging Psychedelic Experiences Project was founded in 2022. It is funded by various private donors.

== Reception ==
Though aiming to help prevent and manage challenging psychedelic experiences, Evans has also been critiqued for making unsubstantiated allegations about the Multidisciplinary Association for Psychedelic Studies (MAPS) and has been described by some critics as an "entrepreneur of psychedelic negativity".

== See also ==
- Bad trip
- Risks of psychedelic drugs
