= The Hive (website) =

Defunct clandestine chemistry forum

The Hive was a website that served as an information-sharing forum for individuals and groups interested in the practical synthesis, chemistry, biology, politics, and legal aspects of mind or body-altering drugs. Participants ranged from pure theorists to self-declared organized crime chemists as well as forensic chemists, who used the Hive to keep abreast of developments in clandestine chemistry. At its peak, the Hive had thousands of participants from all over the world.

== History ==
Although it had been in operation since 1997, The Hive gained broader awareness in 2001 when a Dateline NBC special "The 'X' Files" aired. This investigation into the use and production of MDMA featured the Hive and its founder, who operated under the pseudonym 'Strike' (Hobart Huson). Strike was the founder and site designer of the Hive as well as the author of several popular books (Total Synthesis I and II, and Sources) instructing readers how to synthesize a variety of amphetamines (specifically MDMA), obtain equipment and chemicals, and avoid prosecution. He remained anonymous until Dateline's investigation and interviews revealed that Hobart Huson (owner of the Strike-recommended laboratory supplier "Science Alliance") was the man behind Strike. The NBC program showed Huson/Strike at his office/chemical warehouse, complete with a stuffed bee sitting by his computer. The program led to Huson's arrest and imprisonment, but also spurred the site's growth. A person by the username 'Rhodium' and a small group of dedicated individuals actually ran the Hive and its sister site Rhodium.ws for most of the sites' lifespans.

While The Hive was a public forum for asking questions and exchanging information, Rhodium.ws hosted a collection of drug synthesis information in more condensed and organized form, much of it derived from messages posted on the Hive. It also had a large collection of articles from academic journals, plus considerable general-purpose information on practical chemistry. Rhodium's site was also taken offline shortly after the Hive. Most of the archive is hosted by Erowid. Scattered across the net are more than 1.73 gigabytes of files that were once part of Rhodium's archive.

The Hive was closed in 2004 due to hosting issues. In 2015 the site was made accessible again as a complete archive at Erowid, but the forum pages however are now broken as of late 2016. The Hive now has a successor, "Thevespiary", which hosts a multitude of drug-related articles, synthesis guides, and drug-related news as well as pharmaceutical information.

== See also ==
- Dark-net market
- Erowid
