= Bluelight (web forum) =

Web forum and research portal

Bluelight.org
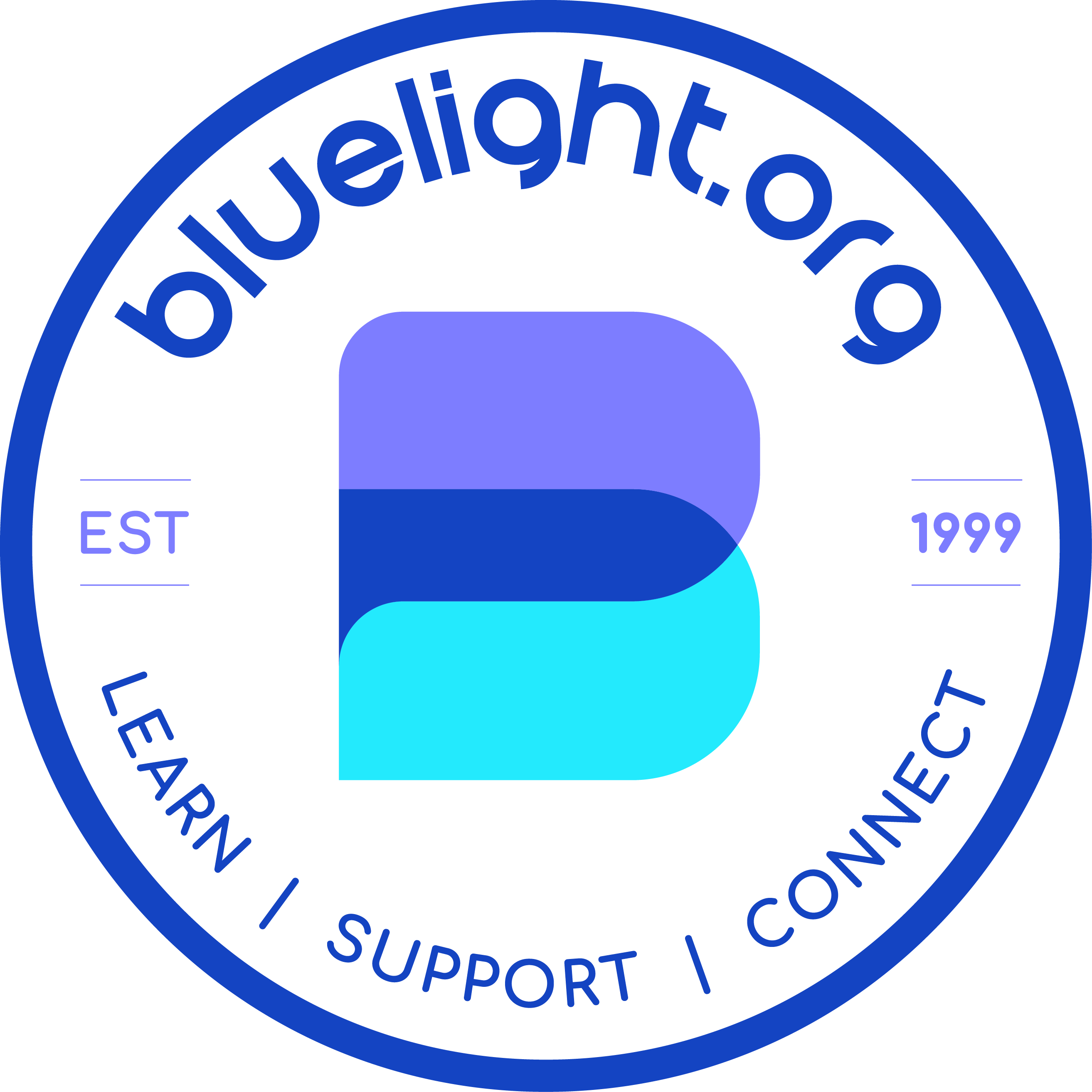
- Nickname: Bluelight
- Predecessor: MDMA Clearinghouse
- Formation: 1997; 29 years ago
- Legal status: Non-profit organisation
- Purpose: Harm reduction, peer support, academic research, mental health, drug education, substance dependence recovery
- Headquarters: Melbourne, Australia
- Region served: International
- Members: 487,000+ (October 2025)
- Official language: English
- Executive Director: Monica J. Barratt
- Parent organization: Bluelight Communities Ltd.
- Affiliations: Multidisciplinary Association for Psychedelic Studies; Erowid; TripSit; PillReports.net
- Volunteers: 50+
- Website: www.bluelight.org
- Formerly called: Bluelight.ru, Bluelight.nu

Bluelight is a web-forum, research portal, online community, and non-profit organisation dedicated to harm reduction in drug use. Its userbase includes current and former substance users, academic researchers, drug policy activists, and mental health advocates. It is believed to be the largest online international drug discussion website in the world. As of November 2025, the website claims over 475,900 registered members, the Discord community claims over 11,900 members, and additional members utilise other platforms such as Telegram.

Bluelight has been utilised by academic researchers as a primary source of data in numerous publications. Researchers also utilise the site to advertise research studies, recruit study participants, and better understand the world of substance use. Research groups and organisations that have partnered with Bluelight to recruit study participants include Imperial College London, Johns Hopkins University, Health Canada, Karlstad University, Curtin University, Macquarie University, Columbia University, University of Pennsylvania, University of Michigan, Toronto Metropolitan University (then known as Ryerson University), and MAPS.

Researchers have found that the most common reasons for substance users to visit Bluelight.org and similar online communities are to learn "how to use drugs safely" and "how to help others use drugs safely."

Bluelight neither condemns or condones drug use, instead advocating for the principle of responsible drug use; educating and allowing individuals to make informed decisions regarding their drug use, providing information on local drug misuse services, and providing them with other drug harm reduction resources and public safety notices.

== History ==
Bluelight.org was originally formed in 1997 as a message board on bluelight.net called the MDMA Clearinghouse. The board was created as a side project by the owner of West Palm Beach design company Bluelight Designs. 200–300 users joined the site between 1998 and 1999, but the site's servers were heavily limited and could only store a few threads at a time; this led to the creation of 'The New Bluelight' forum in May 1999 and the registration of the bluelight.nu domain in June 1999.

The site began to explode in popularity in the early 2000s with the rise of MDMA in the club scene, amassing nearly 7,000 members by the year 2000 and 59,000 by the start of 2006.

The site switched to the bluelight.ru domain in October 2005, and switched again to bluelight.org in January 2014.

In 2022, Bluelight established communities on various social media platforms such as Discord and Telegram, whereas it had previously solely existed as a webforum.

In early 2024, Bluelight was re-structured and the forum became a subsidiary of the newly formed Australian non-profit organisation & registered charity Bluelight Communities Ltd.

== Partnerships ==
In the early 2000s, Bluelight worked with reagent test supplier EZ-Test to promote the sale of drug checking kits.

In 2007, Bluelight partnered with the Multidisciplinary Association for Psychedelic Studies (MAPS), a non-profit organisation working to raise awareness and understanding of psychedelic drugs through education, clinical research, and advocacy. MAPS utilised Bluelight to recruit participants for its first MDMA-assisted psychotherapy trial for PTSD. In 2013, the official MAPS forums were migrated to Bluelight.

Bluelight's other partners include Erowid, a non-profit organisation dedicated to education surrounding psychoactive drugs; TripSit, a harm reduction education website; Pill Reports, a web-based database for drug checking results that was initially formed as an offshoot of the site; and the Global Drug Survey, an independent research organisation focused on collecting data about substance use.

== Notable users ==
- Alan Woods – funded the site's maintenance costs from 1999 until his death in 2008
- Hamilton Morris
- John McAfee – created an infamous series of troll posts about the stimulant MDPV

== See also ==
- Drug checking
- Drug liberalisation
- Needle and syringe programmes
- PsychonautWiki
- Reagent testing
- Supervised injection site
- Trip report
