= Supply reduction =

Supply reduction is one approach to social problems such as drug addiction. Other approaches are demand reduction and harm reduction.

In the case of illegal drugs, supply reduction efforts generally involves attempts to disrupt the manufacturing and distribution supply chains for these drugs, by both civilian law enforcement and sometimes military forces. This approach, sometimes characterized as the "war on drugs", has been the dominant approach to drugs policy since the 1960s.

There is little or no evidence showing that supply reduction methods can be successful as a means to reduce the supply of illicit drugs. For example, the retail price of cocaine in the US in 2007 was less than half the price in 1984, despite massive investments by the US government in supply reduction strategies. Some analysts have argued that the abject failure of supply reduction in the US actually contributed to a significant and lasting reduction in crime and violence beginning in the 1990s, when cocaine prices hit record lows.

In contrast, a systematic review documents moderate and growing evidence that retail greater availability is associated with greater relapse to smoked tobacco.

== See also ==
- Drug policy
- Harm reduction
- Illegal drug trade
- Supply and demand
- War on drugs#Interdiction
