= DanceSafe =

Organization

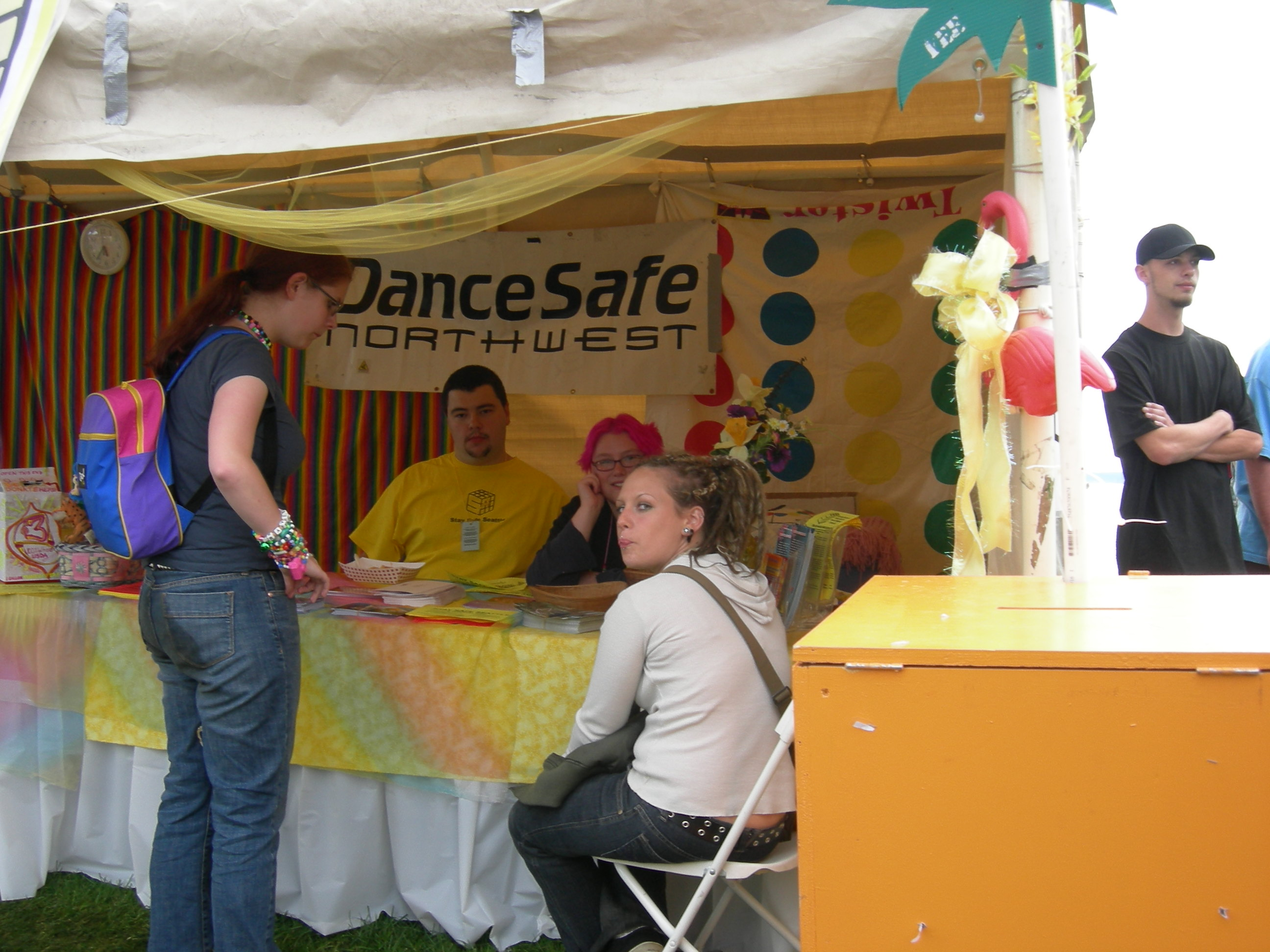
- DanceSafe booth at Seattle Hempfest 2007
- Formation: 1998
- Key people: Monique Chavez, Mikayla Hellwich, Steven Richmond, Wendy Maffie, Rhana Hashemi, Danielle Herrera
- Main organ: ,
- Website: https://www.dancesafe.org/

DanceSafe is a nationally and remotely based nonprofit organization founded in 1998 by then 30 year old Emanuel Sferios. They have 17 local chapters in the US and Canada. DanceSafe volunteers set up tables at music festivals, raves, and other events to distribute non-biased educational literature focused on harm reduction for safe and responsible drug use, including testing kits so that users may obtain more information about the contents of their pills. They also offer on site peer counseling, health and safety tools (condoms, water, earplugs) and patrols for events that assist in keeping patrons safe.

Sferios has resigned in 2001. Tim Santamour served as Executive Director from 2001 to 2004. Bryan Oley served as Board President and from 2001–2009, Nathan Messer as Executive Director from 2009–2012, Melissa "Missi" Wooldridge from 2012–2016, Mitchell Gomez from 2016-5/2025, interim Executive Director Jessica Breemen from 5/2025-12/2025, and is currently headed by interim Executive Director Mikayla Hellwich. DanceSafe currently has a six-member Board of Directors including President Sarah Windels, Vice President Taylor Ashley Crowe, Treasurer Daniel Tarockoff, Secretary Neil Gehani, and Community Relations Officer Brandyn Vandal. The Board of Directors oversees the operations, strategic planning, and fiscal responsibilities of the organization.

Emanuel Sferios, the founder of DanceSafe, claims that his organization has saved lives by preventing young people from taking the more dangerous adulterated pills and by educating them.

On March 31, 2017, DanceSafe was part of a coalition of drug safety organisations hosting the first-ever International Drug Checking Day to raise awareness of safer drug use. The initiative was aimed at recreational users, with a particular emphasis on the nightlife community, and aims to promote harm reduction—accepting that people will choose to take drugs, and providing them with tools to minimize the risks.

== Laboratory adulterant screening ==
Since 1999, DanceSafe has manufactured and sold consumer drug checking kits as part of their harm reduction services for users. DanceSafe also offers on-site pill testing services at harm reduction booths at electronic music events in the United States and Canada. DanceSafe coordinates with event promoters before offering on-site testing services, since some provisions of the so-called Rave Act laws hold organizers and venue owners liable for drug use at their events.

DanceSafe's consumer laboratory pill analysis program was taken over by the Erowid Center in 2001, who now offers drug analysis services for pills and other psychoactive substances through DrugsData (formerly EctstasyData). Erowid is an educational non-profit that receives additional support from several organizations, including DanceSafe. Lab fees for testing vary depending on the form of the substance (powder, pharmaceutical tablet, or street table) and include DEA-approved disposal of substances. The project accepts donations to support drug checking and pill-testing. All testing results since the beginning of the program in 1998 are available for review on DrugData.org.

== Harm Reduction ==
In addition to the work at raves and other events, DanceSafe ran an online harm-reduction 'booth' from 2001–2010. The Booth's administrator was Bryan Oley. In 2013, Dancesafe co-hosted the 8th International Club Health conference in San Francisco that included Academic, law enforcement, Harm Reduction and Health agencies from over 17 countries across the world.
