= Henry H. Huson House and Water Tower =

Historic house in Wisconsin, United States

- U.S. National Register of Historic Places
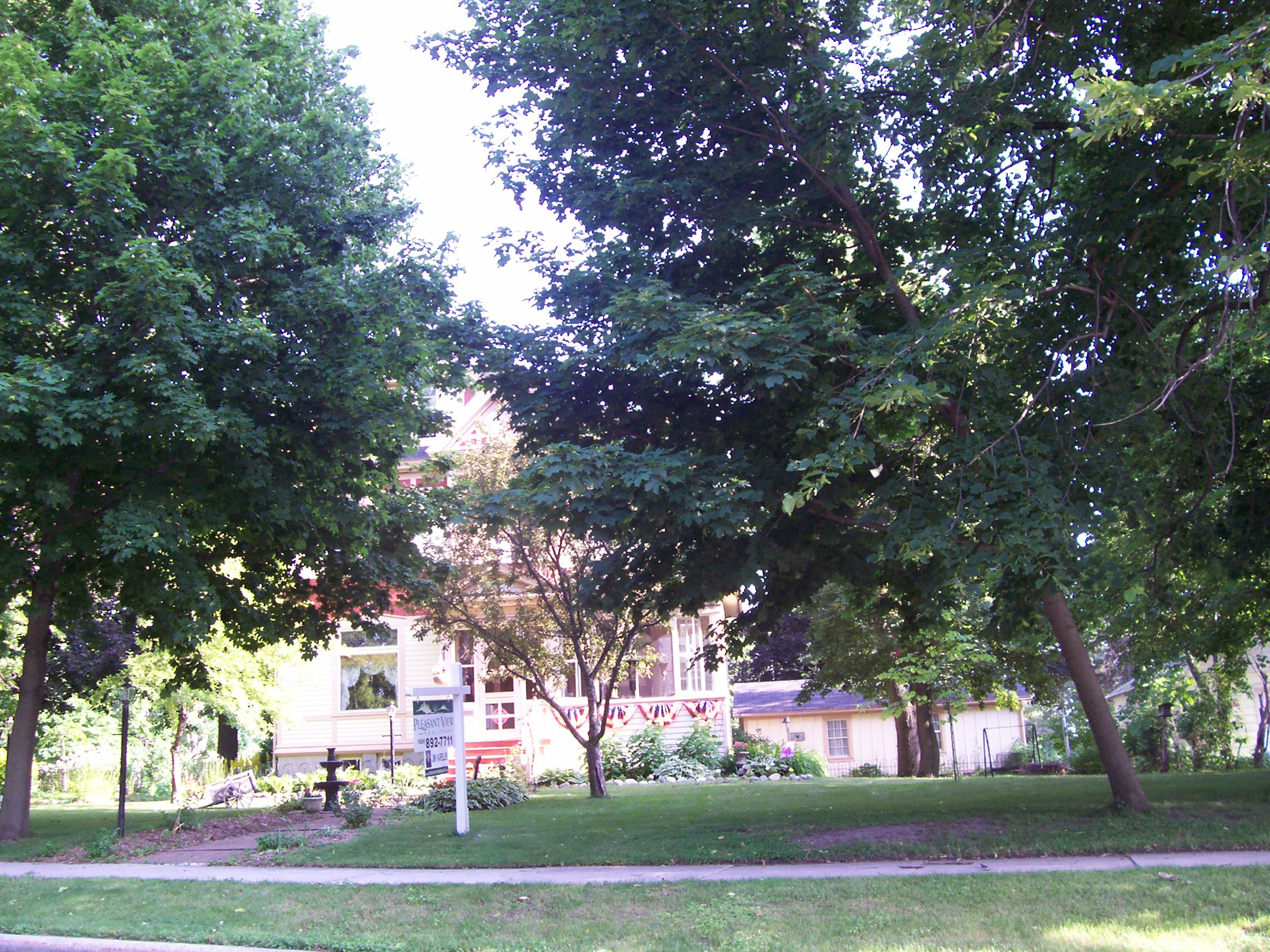
- Henry H. Huson House

- Location within Wisconsin Location within the United States
- Location: 405 Collins St., Plymouth, Wisconsin
- Coordinates: 43°44′44″N 87°58′34″W
- Built: 1870
- NRHP reference No.: 80000196
- Added to NRHP: November 28, 1980

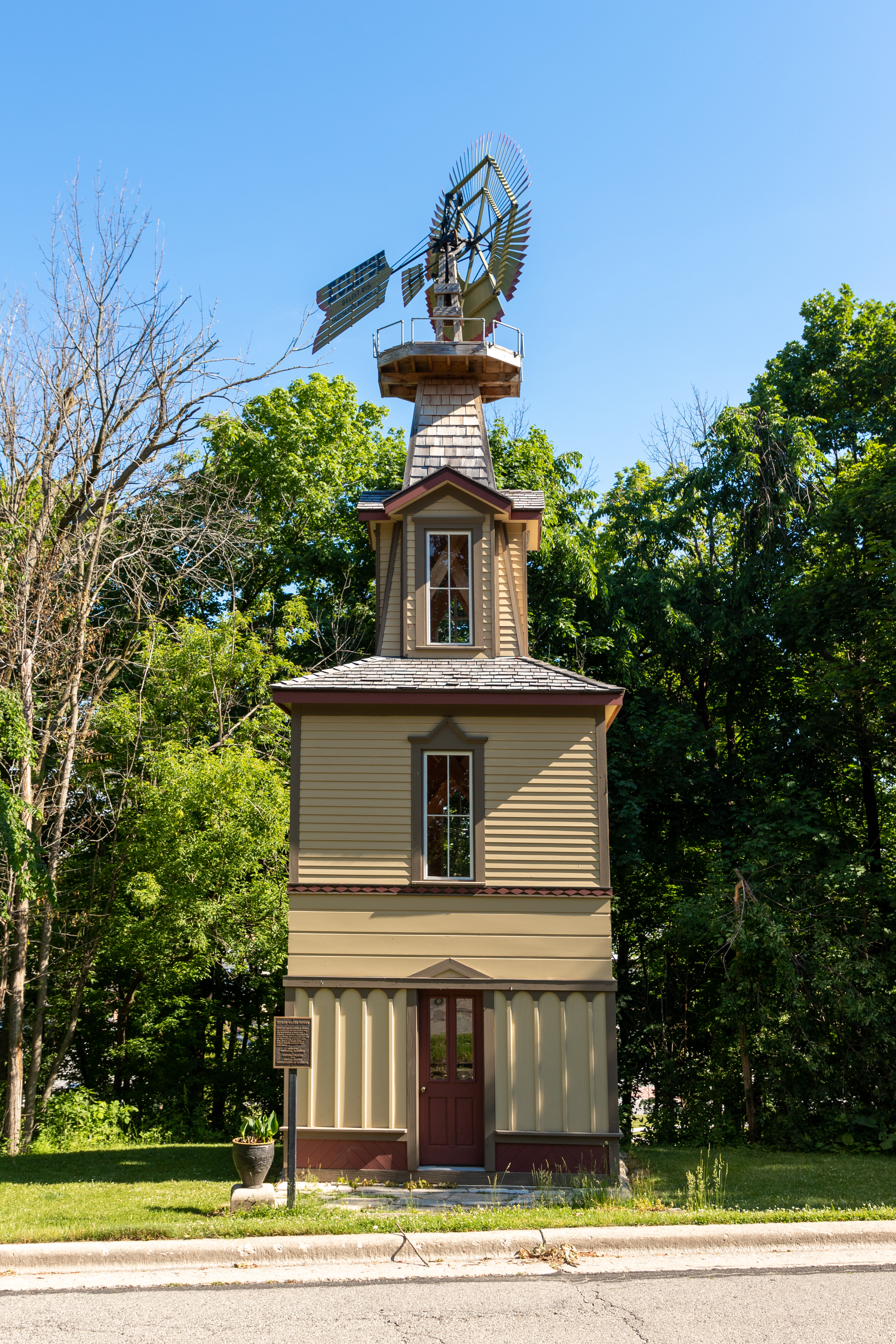
Huson Water Tower

The Henry H. Huson House and Water Tower are two historic structures located in Plymouth, Wisconsin. They were both listed on the National Register of Historic Places on November 28, 1980.

== Description and history ==
There is a locally landmarked Victorian house operated as a Bed & Breakfast named Gilbert Huson House which appears to be a different house nearby, perhaps adjacent. The history of the Gilbert Huson House mentions: "In 1988, the Gilbert Huson House was designated a Sheboygan County Landmark. The home operated as Yankee Hill Bed and Breakfast in conjunction with the Henry Huson House until we purchased it in 2003. We renamed it after its original owner, Gilbert L. Huson."

== Water tower ==
The water tower was built across the street from the Henry H. Huson residence in 1885. The private water tower was powered by a windmill. It was operated for about 15 years until Plymouth installed their traditional municipal water system.
