= Demand reduction =

Efforts to reduce demand for illegal drugs

Demand reduction refers to efforts aimed at reducing the public desire for illegal and illicit drugs. The drug policy is in contrast to the reduction of drug supply, but the two policies are often implemented together. Some discussions of demand reduction make a distinction between policies that address single issues (such as public "knowledge-of-harms") or are short-term interventions(in-school programs), and those that approach drug demand as a complex issue with multiple social risk factors. Some economists such as Milton Friedman argue that due to the law of supply and demand, reducing demand is the only effective way to reduce drug use long-term. It is questionable, however, whether demand reduction programs actually reduce demand.

== Implementation examples ==
In September 2011, Canada implemented new color graphic depictions of the consequences of smoking, mandating that they cover 75% of the front and back of each carton, health information messages on the inside of the pack, and toxic emissions statements. Each tobacco product features one such image from a series, which includes people dying in hospitals, rotting mouths, and dissected body parts depicting tumors, along with simple bold messages stating that cigarettes cause cancer, mouth disease, impotence, and harm babies. International research supports the efficacy of such warning messages.

Other examples of demand reduction programs include D.A.R.E., the state of Montana's Not Even Once, and the drug policy of Sweden.

== See also ==
- Arguments for and against drug prohibition
- Drug policy
- Drug policy of the Soviet Union
- Harm reduction
- Self-medication
- Supply and demand
