= Set and setting =

Mindset and location of a drug experience

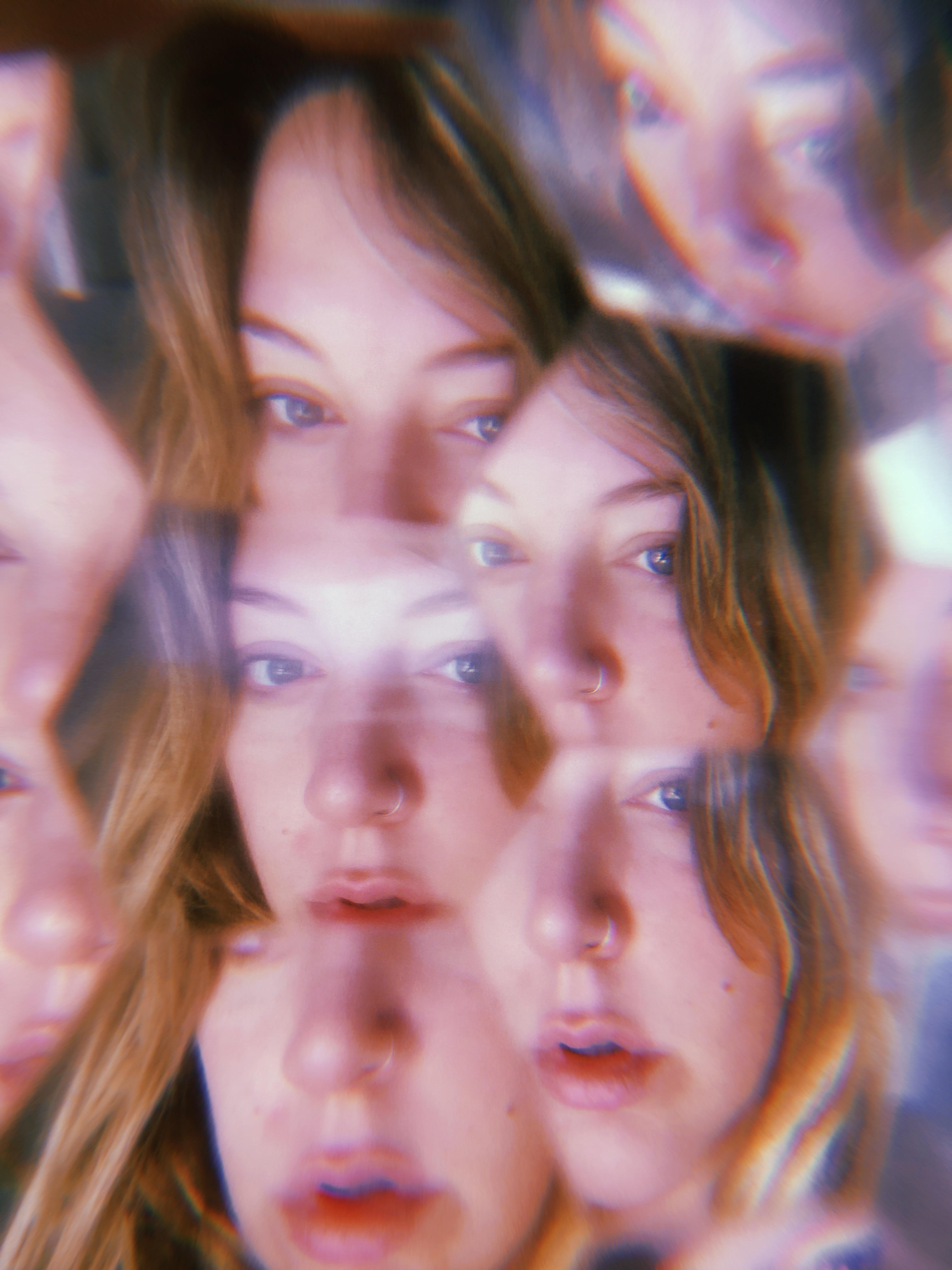
The "set" and "setting" are critical to avoid a "bad trip"

Set and setting, when referring to a psychedelic drug experience or the use of other psychoactive substances, means one's mindset (shortened to "set") and the physical and social environment (the "setting") in which the user has the experience. Set and setting are factors that can condition the effects of psychoactive substances: "Set" refers to the mental state a person brings to the experience, like thoughts, mood and expectations; "setting" to the physical and social environment. This is especially relevant for psychedelic experiences in either a therapeutic or recreational context.

== History ==
According to the 2018 book How to Change Your Mind by Michael Pollan, the concept of set and setting was observed by the "Johnny Appleseed" of LSD, Al Hubbard, visiting mushroom ceremonies in Mexico. The terms were used at least as early as 1958 by Ludwig von Bertalanffy and popularized by Timothy Leary in 1961, and became widely accepted by researchers in psychedelic therapy. Norman Zinberg also extensively discussed this in Drug, Set, and Setting: The Basis for Controlled Intoxicant Use (1984).

Due to the importance of setting in early psychedelic therapy, Hubbard introduced a "treatment space decorated to feel more like a home than a hospital", which came to be known as a "Hubbard Room".

In 1966, Timothy Leary conducted a series of experiments with dimethyltryptamine (DMT) with controlled set and setting. The aim was to see whether DMT, which had then been mostly thought of as a terror-inducing drug, could produce pleasant experiences under a supportive set and setting. It was found that it could.

Set and setting has also been investigated from a religious perspective.

The concept of set and setting has more recently been extended beyond psychedelics. Zinberg "sought to integrate the ideas of set and setting into a theory of harm reduction which examined not only psychedelic use but also drugs such as alcohol, cocaine, and heroin" and, more recently, the concept has been used to understand the circumstances of opioid overdoses.

In the essay Dopo il Rinascimento psichedelico (After the psychedelic Renaissance), Italian writer Vanni Santoni has suggested the existence of a third factor influencing any psychedelic experience besides set and setting: "framing", that is to say the historical and socio-political context.

== Practice ==
Social support networks have shown to be particularly important in the outcome of the psychedelic experience. They are able to control or guide the course of the experience, both consciously and subconsciously. A relaxed, curious person in a warm, comfortable and safe place is more likely to have a pleasant experience. Stress, fear, a disagreeable material, social, and cultural environment, including situations of racism or discrimination, may result in an unpleasant experience (bad trip). In case of a bad trip, a trip killer may be used to abort the trip.

Of course, the drug dose does not produce the transcendent experience. It merely acts as a chemical key – it opens the mind, frees the nervous system of its ordinary patterns and structures. The nature of the experience depends almost entirely on set and setting. Set denotes the preparation of the individual, including his personality structure and his mood at the time. Setting is physical – the weather, the room's atmosphere; social – feelings of persons present towards one another; and cultural – prevailing views as to what is real. It is for this reason that manuals or guide-books are necessary. Their purpose is to enable a person to understand the new realities of the expanded consciousness, to serve as road maps for new interior territories which modern science has made accessible.

— Timothy Leary, The Psychedelic Experience: A Manual Based on the Tibetan Book of the Dead

Research has shown that a curated music playlist can be part of a favourable setting. Set and setting are critical in the design of psychiatric facilities and modalities of psychedelic-assisted psychotherapies.

Some scientists have suggested that the principle of intentional setting may be relevant beyond the acute experience itself, as recent research has drawn attention to the post-acute period of increased neuroplasticity following the dosing session, sometimes referred to as the "psychedelic afterglow". A small 2026 multimodal study found that psychological insight measured the day after a high-dose psilocybin session mediated the relationship between acute brain entropy and improvements in well-being one month later, suggesting that the post-acute window may be of relevance to long-term outcomes. Preclinical work in rodents has shown that a single dose of psilocybin induces rapid dendritic spine remodeling in the frontal cortex that emerges within 24 hours and persists for weeks. Human neuroimaging has found desynchronization of cortical networks lasting up to three weeks after a single high-dose session, together offering a potential neurobiological substrate for the relevance of this integration window.

== See also ==
- Altered state of consciousness
- Counterculture of the 1960s
- Out-of-body experience
- Responsible drug use
- Sensory deprivation
- Trip killer - A substance used to abort psychedelic trips
- Trip sitter
