= Hobart Huson =

American writer and website developer

Hobart Huson, also known as Strike, is the founder and site designer of online forum The Hive and author of several popular books such as Total Synthesis I and II, and Sources, in which he details methods of synthesizing a variety of amphetamines, obtaining equipment and chemicals, and avoiding prosecution for said activity. From his books, it is clear that MDMA was the drug he found to be most compelling (although he asserts in Total Synthesis II that MDA is preferable to MDMA): in the book, he describes it as "the most benign drug [I have] ever encountered."

Huson posted on The Hive under the pseudonym Strike and was considered something of an expert on the topic of underground drug synthesis. His true identity was revealed following a ten-month investigation by NBC show Dateline. A special episode of Dateline called "The "X" Files" aired in 2001, after which he was arrested and imprisoned for various drug charges pertaining to the manufacture of MDMA.

Despite Huson's arrest, popularity for The Hive continued to grow until it went offline in 2004. At its peak, the Hive had thousands of participants from all over the world.

Additionally, Huson operated Science Alliance, a Texas-based company that sold chemicals. In September 2003 Huson started an eight-year term in Federal Correctional Institution, Bastrop for drug related charges related to his business. He was released on June 20, 2009. He was also charged with one count of the sale of chemicals and equipment to produce dangerous drugs, stemming from a multi-agency drug bust of G3 Custom Fabrications on June 22, 2000, in Flagstaff, Arizona.

== Books ==
- Total Synthesis. Panda Ink; 1 edition (April 1997) ISBN 978-0-9658291-0-6
- Total Synthesis II. Panda Ink; 1 edition (August 1998) ISBN 978-0-9658291-2-0
- Sources. Panda Ink; 1 edition (March 1998) ISBN 978-0-9658291-1-3
