= Harm reduction =

Public health policies which lessen negative aspects of problematic activities

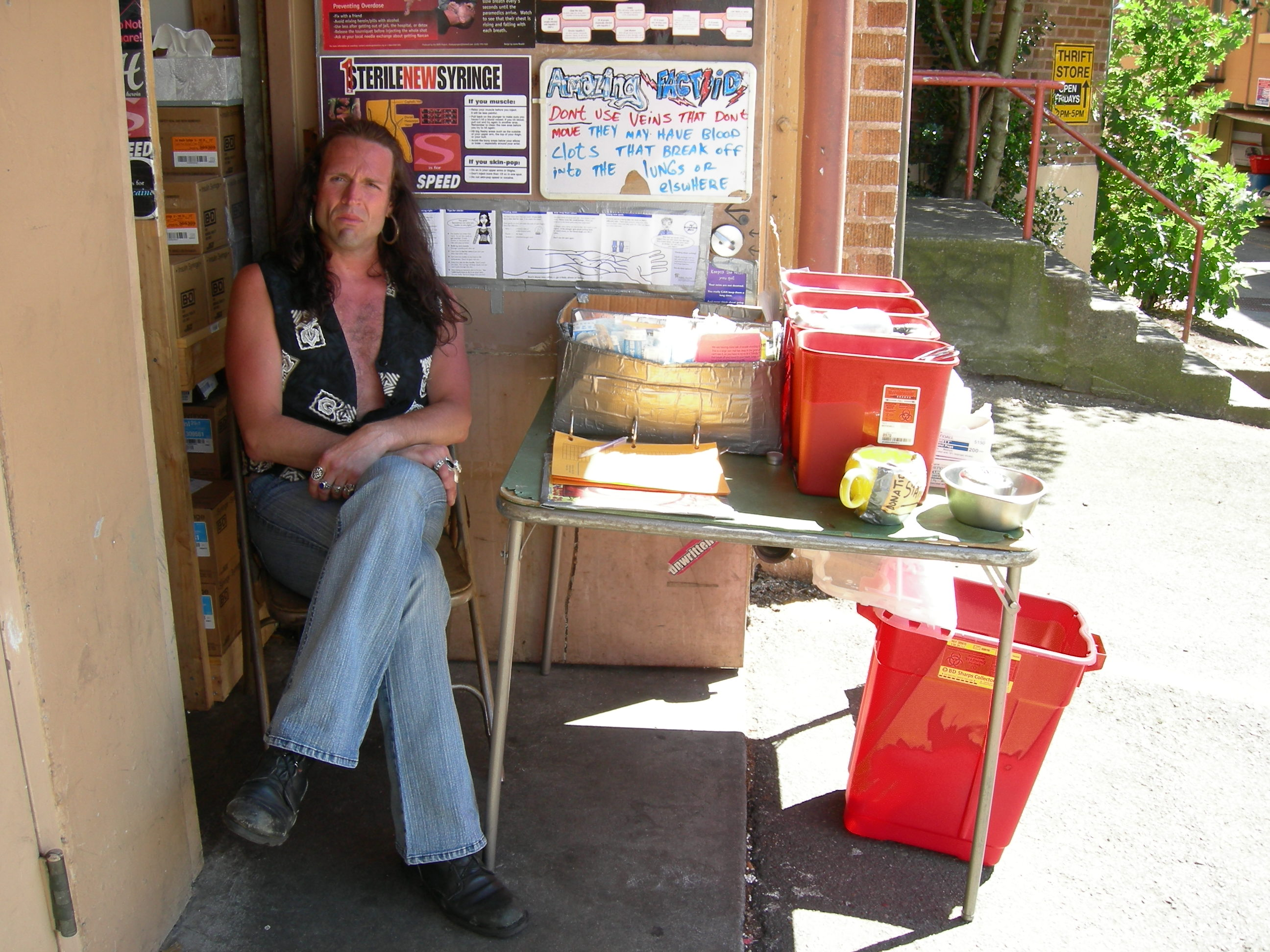
Needle exchange programs provide people who inject substances with new needles and injection equipment to reduce the harm (e.g., HIV infection) from needle drug use.

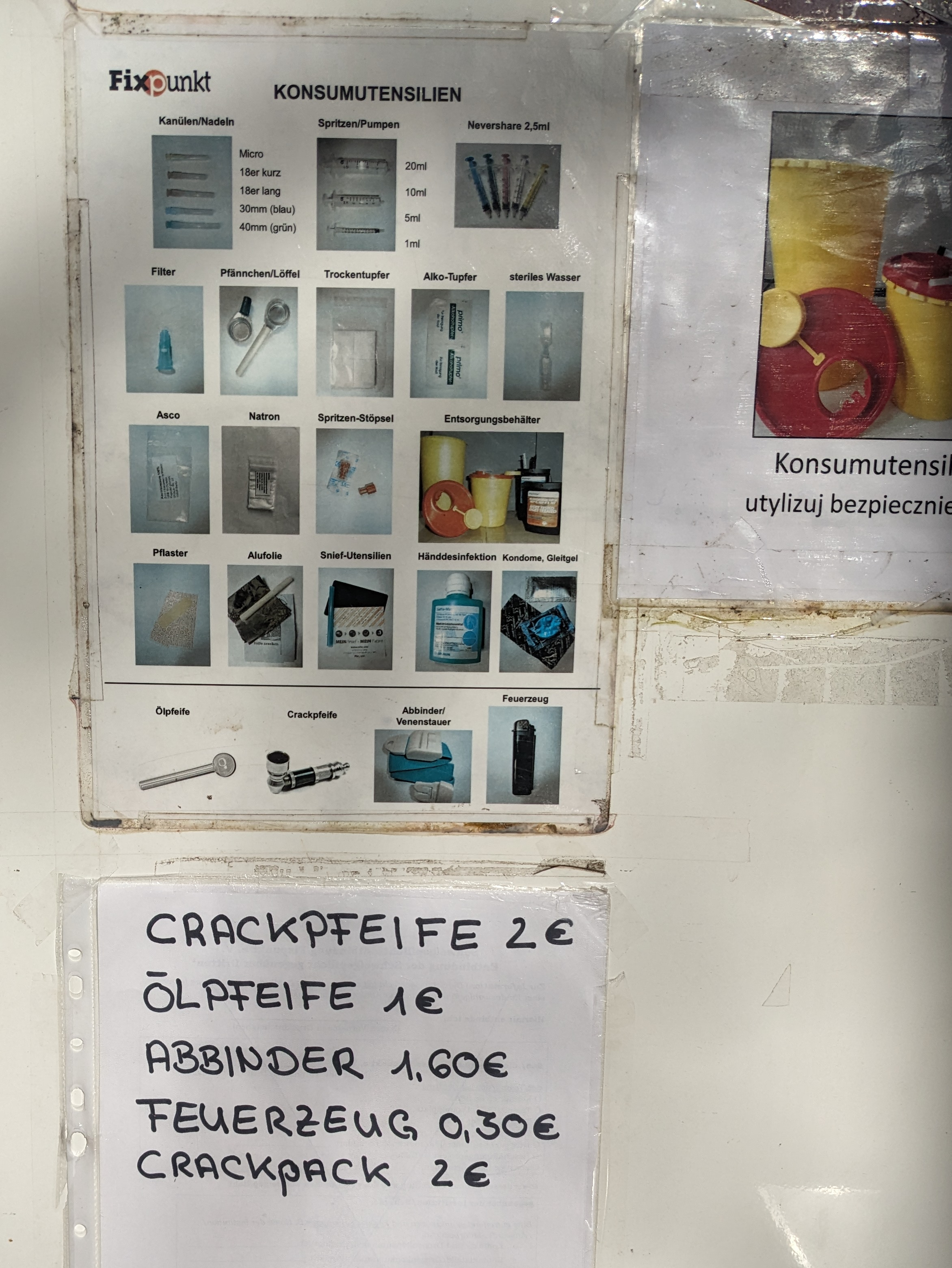
Drug paraphernalia available from a harm reduction NGO at a mobile supervised injection site in Berlin, Germany

Harm reduction, or harm minimization, refers to a range of intentional practices and public health policies designed to lessen the negative social and/or physical consequences associated with various human behaviors, both legal and illegal. Harm reduction is used to encourage healthy behaviors that can decrease the negative consequences for those facing life challenges like homelessness and food insecurity, or engaging in harm-prone behaviors such as recreational drug use and high-risk sexual activity. Harm reduction initiatives recognize that people can make positive changes to protect themselves and others, without requiring abstinence.

Harm reduction is most commonly applied to approaches that reduce adverse consequences from drug use, and harm reduction programs now operate across a range of services and in different regions of the world. As of 2020, some 86 countries had one or more programs using a harm reduction approach to substance use, primarily aimed at reducing blood-borne infections resulting from use of contaminated injecting equipment.

Needle-exchange programmes, or syringe service programmes, reduce the likelihood of people who use heroin and other substances sharing the syringes and using them more than once. Syringe-sharing often leads to the spread of infections such as HIV or hepatitis C, which can easily spread from person to person through the reuse of syringes contaminated with infected blood. Needle and syringe programmes (NSP) and Opioid Agonist Therapy (OAT) outlets in some settings offer basic primary health care. Supervised injection sites are legally sanctioned, medically supervised facilities designed to provide a safe, hygienic, and stress-free environment for people who use substances. The facilities provide sterile injection equipment, information about substances and basic health care, treatment referrals, and access to medical staff.

Opioid agonist therapy (OAT) is the medical procedure of using a harm-reducing opioid that produces significantly less euphoria, such as methadone or buprenorphine to reduce opioid cravings in people who use illegal opioids, such as heroin; buprenorphine and methadone are taken under medical supervision. Another approach is heroin assisted treatment, in which medical prescriptions for pharmaceutical heroin (diacetylmorphine) are provided to people who are dependent on heroin.

Media campaigns inform drivers of the dangers of driving drunk. Most people who recreationally consume alcohol are now aware of these dangers and safe ride techniques like 'designated drivers' and free taxicab programmes are reducing the number of drunk-driving crashes. Many schools now provide safer sex education to teen and pre-teen students, who may engage in sexual activity. Since some adolescents are going to have sex, a harm-reductionist approach supports a sexual education which emphasizes the use of protective devices like condoms and dental dams to protect against unwanted pregnancy and the transmission of STIs. Since 1999, some countries have legalized or decriminalized prostitution, such as Germany (2002) and New Zealand (2003).

Many street-level harm-reduction strategies have succeeded in reducing HIV transmission in people who inject substances and sex-workers. HIV education, HIV testing, condom use, and safer-sex negotiation greatly decreases the risk of acquiring and transmitting HIV.

== Principles and ethical foundations ==
Across its applications, harm reduction prioritizes reducing adverse consequences without requiring elimination of the underlying behavior. In drug policy, this orientation is commonly described as pragmatic: it begins from the continued existence of drug use and regards reductions in harm as worthwhile outcomes even when abstinence is not achieved. Ethical defenses have also drawn on consequentialist and rights-based reasoning. Consequentialist arguments emphasize reductions in illness, death, and social costs, while rights-based arguments appeal to autonomy and opposition to paternalism. The harm can be distinguished in physical harms, dependence and social harms including health care costs and community outcomes.

Social justice approaches broaden the analysis of harm beyond individual behavior to include poverty, homelessness, criminalization, violence, stigma, and barriers to health care. From this perspective, harm reduction may respond to structural inequities as well as immediate individual risk. Relational and participatory approaches emphasize that people who use drugs possess knowledge relevant to effective services and should participate in their design and governance. User-led organizations and peer practices have been important within this tradition.

Ethical analysis of harm-reduction research has also used communitarian approaches, emphasizing social relationships and responsibilities alongside individual rights. Recent nursing-ethics scholarship has connected harm reduction with trauma-informed care, critical pedagogy, and epistemic justice, arguing that safety, trust, collaboration, and recognition of lived experience are ethical features of the encounter rather than merely means of achieving better outcomes.

== Substance use ==
In the case of recreational substance use, harm reduction is put forward as a useful perspective alongside the more conventional approaches of demand and supply reduction. Many advocates argue that prohibitionist laws criminalise people for suffering from a disease and cause harm for example, by obliging people who use substances to obtain substances of unknown purity from unreliable criminal sources at high prices, thereby increasing the risk of overdose and death. The web forum Bluelight allows users to share information and first-hand experience reports about various psychoactive substances and harm reduction practices. The website Erowid collects and publishes information and first-hand experience reports about all kinds of substances to educate people who use or may use substances.

While the vast majority of harm reduction initiatives are educational campaigns or facilities that aim to reduce substance-related harm, a unique social enterprise was launched in Denmark in September 2013 to reduce the financial burden of illicit substance use for people with a drug dependence. Michael Lodberg Olsen, who was previously involved with the establishment of a substance consumption facility in Denmark, announced the founding of the Illegal magazine that will be sold by people who use substances in Copenhagen and the district of Vesterbro, who will be able to direct the profits from sales towards drug procurement. Olsen explained: "No one has solved the problem of drug addiction, so is it not better that people find the money to buy their drugs this way than through crime and prostitution?"

=== Substances ===
==== Depressants ====
===== Alcohol =====
Traditionally, homeless shelters ban alcohol. In 1997, as the result of an inquest into the deaths of two people experiencing homelessness who recreationally used alcohol two years earlier, Toronto's Seaton House became the first homeless shelter in Canada to operate a "wet shelter" on a "managed alcohol" principle in which clients are served a glass of wine once an hour unless staff determine that they are too inebriated to continue. Previously, people experiencing homelessness who consumed excessive amounts of alcohol opted to stay on the streets, often seeking alcohol from unsafe sources such as mouthwash, rubbing alcohol or industrial products which, in turn, resulted in frequent use of emergency medical facilities. The programme has been duplicated in other Canadian cities, and a study of Ottawa's "wet shelter" found that emergency room visit and police encounters by clients were cut by half. The study, published in the Canadian Medical Association Journal in 2006, found that serving people experiencing long-term homelessness and who consume excessive amounts of alcohol controlled doses of alcohol also reduced their overall alcohol consumption. Researchers found that programme participants cut their alcohol use from an average of 46 drinks a day when they entered the programme to an average of 8 drinks and that their visits to emergency rooms dropped from 13.5 to an average of 8 per month, while encounters with the police fall from 18.1 to an average of 8.8.

Downtown Emergency Service Center (DESC), in Seattle, Washington, operates several Housing First programmes which utilize the harm reduction model. University of Washington researchers, partnering with DESC, found that providing housing and support services for homeless alcoholics costs taxpayers less than leaving them on the street, where taxpayer money goes towards police and emergency health care. Results of the study funded by the Substance Abuse Policy Research Program (SAPRP) of the Robert Wood Johnson Foundation appeared in the Journal of the American Medical Association in April 2009. This first controlled assessment in the U.S. of the effectiveness of Housing First, specifically targeting chronically homeless alcoholics, showed that the programme saved taxpayers more than $4 million over the first year of operation. During the first six months, the study reported an average cost-savings of 53 percent (even after considering the cost of administering the housing's 95 residents)—nearly $2,500 per month per person in health and social services, compared to the per month costs of a wait-list control group of 39 homeless people. Further, despite the fact residents are not required to be abstinent or in treatment for alcohol use, stable housing also results in reduced drinking among people experiencing homelessness who recreationally use alcohol.

====== Alcohol-related programmes ======
A high amount of media coverage exists informing people of the dangers of driving drunk. Most people who recreationally consume alcohol are now aware of these dangers and safe ride techniques like 'designated drivers' and free taxicab programmes are reducing the number of drunk-driving crashes. Many cities have free-ride-home programmes during holidays involving high amounts of alcohol use, and some bars and clubs will provide a visibly drunk patron with a free cab ride.

In New South Wales groups of licensees have formed local liquor accords and collectively developed, implemented and promoted a range of harm minimisation programmes including the aforementioned 'designated driver' and 'late night patron transport' schemes. Many of the transport schemes are free of charge to patrons, to encourage them to avoid drink-driving and at the same time reduce the impact of noisy patrons loitering around late night venues.

Moderation Management is a programme which helps drinkers to cut back on their consumption of alcohol by encouraging safe drinking behaviour.

Harm reduction in alcohol dependency could be instituted by use of naltrexone.

===== Opioids =====
====== Heroin maintenance programmes (HAT) ======
Providing medical prescriptions for pharmaceutical heroin (diacetylmorphine) to heroin-dependent people has been employed in some countries to address problems associated with the illicit use of the drug, as potential benefits exist for the individual and broader society. Evidence has indicated that this form of treatment can greatly improve the health and social circumstances of participants, while also reducing costs incurred by criminalisation, incarceration and health interventions.

In Switzerland, heroin assisted treatment is an established programme of the national health system. Several dozen centres exist throughout the country and heroin-dependent people can administer heroin in a controlled environment at these locations. The Swiss heroin maintenance programme is generally regarded as a successful and valuable component of the country's overall approach to minimising the harms caused by illicit drug use. In a 2008 national referendum, a majority of 68 per cent voted in favour of continuing the Swiss programme.

The Netherlands has studied medically supervised heroin maintenance. A German study of long-term heroin addicts demonstrated that diamorphine was significantly more effective than methadone in keeping patients in treatment and in improving their health and social situation. Many participants were able to find employment, some even started a family after years of homelessness and delinquency. Since then, treatment had continued in the cities that participated in the pilot study, until heroin maintenance was permanently included into the national health system in May 2009. As of 2021, the country offers heroin-assisted treatment by prescribing medical-grade heroin is typically prescribed in combination with methadone and psychosocial counseling.

A heroin maintenance programme has existed in the United Kingdom (UK) since the 1920s, as drug addiction was seen as an individual health problem. Addiction to opiates was rare in the 1920s and was mostly limited to either middle-class people who had easy access due to their profession, or people who had become addicted as a side effect of medical treatment. In the 1950s and 1960s a small number of doctors contributed to an alarming increase in the number of people who are experiencing addiction in the U.K. through excessive prescribing—the U.K. switched to more restrictive drug legislation as a result. However, the British government is again moving towards a consideration of heroin prescription as a legitimate component of the National Health Service (NHS). Evidence has shown that methadone maintenance is not appropriate for all people who are dependent on opioids and that heroin is a viable maintenance drug that has shown equal or better rates of success.

A committee appointed by the Norwegian government completed an evaluation of research reports on heroin maintenance treatment that were available internationally. In 2011 the committee concluded that the presence of numerous uncertainties and knowledge gaps regarding the effects of heroin treatment meant that it could not recommend the introduction of heroin maintenance treatment in Norway.

Critics of heroin maintenance programmes object to the high costs of providing heroin to people who use it. The British heroin study cost the British government £15,000 per participant per year, roughly equivalent to average person who uses heroin's expense of £15,600 per year. Drug Free Australia contrast these ongoing maintenance costs with Sweden's investment in, and commitment to, a drug-free society where a policy of compulsory rehabilitation of people who are experiencing drug addiction is integral, which has yielded to one of the lowest reported illicit drug use levels in the developed world, a model in which successfully rehabilitated people who use substances present no further maintenance costs to their community, as well as reduced ongoing health care costs.

King's Health Partners notes that the cost of providing free heroin for a year is about one-third of the cost of placing the person in prison for a year.

====== Naloxone distribution ======
Naloxone is a drug used to counter an overdose from the effect of opioids; for example, a heroin or morphine overdose. Naloxone displaces the opioid molecules from the brain's receptors and reverses the respiratory depression caused by an overdose within two to eight minutes. The World Health Organization (WHO) includes naloxone on their "List of Essential Medicines", and recommends its availability and utilization for the reversal of opioid overdoses.

Formal programs in which the opioid inverse agonist drug naloxone is distributed have been trialled and implemented. Established programs distribute naloxone, as per WHO's minimum standards, to people who use substances and their peers, family members, police, prisons, and others. These treatment programs and harm reduction centres operate in Afghanistan, Australia, Canada, China, Germany, Georgia, Kazakhstan, Norway, Russia, Spain, Tajikistan, the United Kingdom (UK), the United States (US), Vietnam, India, Thailand, Kyrgyzstan, Denmark and Estonia. Many reviews of the literature support the effectiveness of naloxone based interventions in reducing overdose deaths where it is available at the time of the overdose event. This effectiveness has been explained in a Realist Evaluation which explained the effectiveness through bystander effect, social identity theory, and skills training such that universal access to training supports social identity and in-group norms (of people who use drugs), which supports the conditions for the success of a peer-to-peer distribution model of naloxone-based interventions. Stigma and stigmatising attitudes reduced the effectiveness of naloxone based interventions.

====== Medication assisted treatment (MAT): Opioid agonist therapy (OAT) and Opioid substitution therapy (OST) ======
Medication assisted treatment (MAT) is the prescription of legal, prescribed opioids or other drugs, often long-acting, to diminish the use of illegal opioids. Many types of MAT exist, including opioid agonist therapy (OAT) where a safer opioid agonist is employed or opioid substitution therapy (OST) which employs partial opioid agonists. However, MAT, OAT, OST are often used synonymously.

Opioid agonist therapy (OAT) involves the use of a full opioid agonist treatment like methadone and is generally taken daily at a clinic. Opioid substitution therapy (OST) involves the use of the partial agonist buprenorphine or a combination of buprenorphine/naloxone (brand name Suboxone). Oral/sublingual formulations of buprenorphine incorporate the opioid antagonist naloxone to prevent people from crushing the tablets and injecting them. Unlike methadone treatment, buprenorphine therapy can be prescribed month-to-month and obtained at a traditional pharmacy rather than a clinic.

The driving principle behind OAT/OST is the program's capacity to facilitate a resumption of stability in the person's life, while they experience reduced symptoms of withdrawal symptoms and less intense drug cravings; however, a strong euphoric effect is not experienced as a result of the treatment drug.

In some countries, such as Switzerland, Austria, and Slovenia, patients are treated with slow-release morphine when methadone is deemed inappropriate due to the individual's circumstances. In Germany, dihydrocodeine has been used off-label in OAT for many years, however it is no longer frequently prescribed for this purpose. Extended-release dihydrocodeine is again in current use in Austria for this reason. Research into the usefulness of piritramide, extended-release hydromorphone (including polymer implants lasting up to 90 days), dihydroetorphine and other substances for OAT is at various stages in a number of countries. In 2020 in Vancouver, Canada, health authorities began vending machine dispensing of hydromorphone tablets as a response to elevated rates of fatal overdose from street drugs contaminated with fentanyl and fentanyl analogues.

In some countries (not the US, UK, Canada, or Australia), regulations enforce a limited time period for people on OAT/OST programs that conclude when a stable economic and psychosocial situation is achieved. (Patients with HIV/AIDS or hepatitis C are usually excluded from this requirement.) In practice, 40–65% of patients maintain complete abstinence from opioids while receiving opioid agonist therapy, and 70–95% are able to reduce their use significantly, while experiencing a concurrent elimination or reduction in medical (improper diluents, non-sterile injecting equipment), psychosocial (mental health, relationships), and legal (arrest and imprisonment) issues that can arise from the use of illicit opioids.

OAT/OST outlets in some settings also offer basic primary health care. These are known as 'targeted primary health care outlet'—as these outlets primarily target people who inject drugs and/or 'low-threshold health care outlet'—as these reduce common barriers clients often face when they try to access health care from the conventional health care outlets. For accessing sterile injecting equipment clients frequently visit NSP outlets, and for receiving pharmacotherapy (e.g. methadone, buprenorphine) they visit OST clinics; these frequent visits are used opportunistically to offer much needed health care. These targeted outlets have the potential to mitigate clients' perceived barriers to access to healthcare delivered in traditional settings. The provision of accessible, acceptable and opportunistic services which are responsive to the needs of this population is valuable, facilitating a reduced reliance on inappropriate and cost-ineffective emergency department care.

===== Cannabis =====
Specific harms associated with cannabis include increased crash-rate while driving under intoxication, dependence, psychosis, detrimental psychosocial outcomes for adolescents who use substances, and respiratory disease. Some safer cannabis usage campaigns including the UKCIA (United Kingdom Cannabis Internet Activists) encourage methods of consumption shown to cause less physical damage to a person's body, including oral (eating) consumption, vaporization, the usage of bongs which cool and to some extent filters the smoke, and smoking the cannabis without mixing it with tobacco.

The fact that cannabis possession carries prison sentences in most developed countries is also pointed out as a problem by European Monitoring Centre for Drugs and Drug Addiction (EMCDDA), as the consequences of a conviction for otherwise law-abiding people who use substances arguably is more harmful than any harm from the substance itself. For example, by adversely affecting employment opportunities, impacting civil rights, and straining personal relationships. Some people like Ethan Nadelmann of the Drug Policy Alliance have suggested that organized marijuana legalization would encourage safe use and reveal the factual adverse effects from exposure to this herb's individual chemicals.

The way the laws concerning cannabis are enforced is also very selective, even discriminatory. Statistics show that the socially disadvantaged, immigrants and ethnic minorities have significantly higher arrest rates. Drug decriminalisation, such as allowing the possession of small amounts of cannabis and possibly its cultivation for personal use, would alleviate these harms. Where decriminalisation has been implemented, such as in several states in Australia and United States, as well as in Portugal and the Netherlands no, or only very small adverse effects have been shown on population cannabis usage rate. The lack of evidence of increased use indicates that such a policy shift does not have adverse effects on cannabis-related harm while, at the same time, decreasing enforcement costs.

In the last few years certain strains of the cannabis plant with higher concentrations of THC and drug tourism have challenged the former policy in the Netherlands and led to a more restrictive approach; for example, a ban on selling cannabis to tourists in coffeeshops suggested to start late 2011. Sale and possession of cannabis is still illegal in Portugal and possession of cannabis is a federal crime in the United States.

==== Psychedelics ====
The Zendo Project conducted by the Multidisciplinary Association for Psychedelic Studies uses principles from psychedelic therapy to provide safe places and emotional support for people having difficult experiences on psychedelic drugs at select festivals such as Burning Man, Boom Festival, and Lightning in a Bottle without medical or law enforcement intervention.

==== Stimulants ====
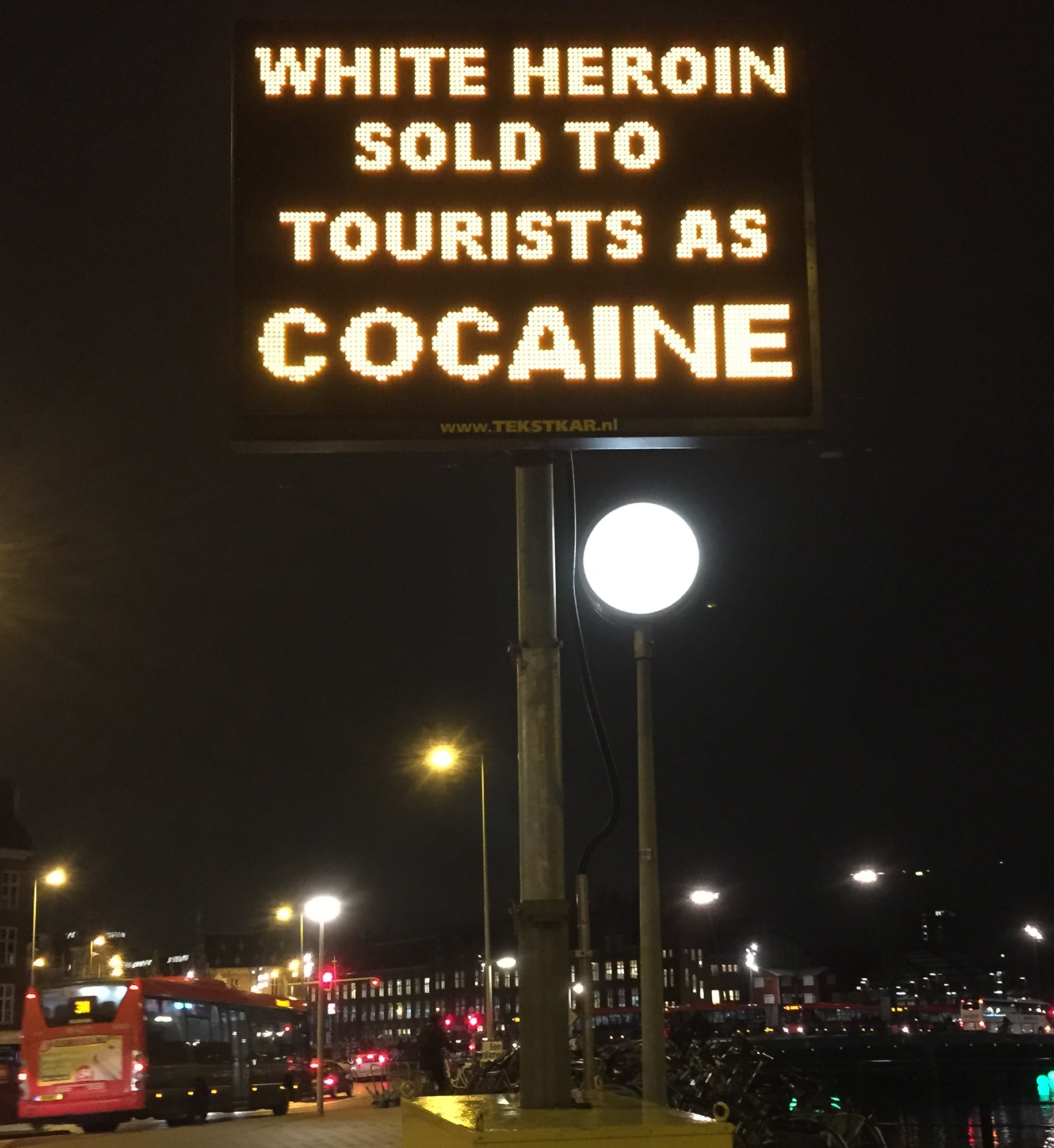
Warning sign in Amsterdam after 3 tourists died after taking white heroin that was sold as cocaine

The United Nations Office on Drugs and Crime states, "While medical models of treatment for individuals with alcohol or opioid use disorders are well accepted and implemented worldwide, in most countries there is no parallel, long-term medical model of treatment for individuals with stimulant use disorders." The neglect of stimulant-users has been widely considered to be related to the popularity of stimulants among systemically-oppressed groups, such as methamphetamine use among gay men and transgender people, and crack cocaine use among Black people. The crack epidemic in the United States demonstrates a discrepancy between sentencing lengths of crack cocaine and heroin users, with crack users imprisoned for longer periods of time than heroin users. In 2012, 88% of imprisonments from crack cocaine were of African American people.

Stimulant users have increasingly been at risk for opioid overdose since 2006, due to the nonconsensual presence of fentanyl in their substances.

===== Tobacco =====
Tobacco harm reduction describes actions taken to lower the health risks associated with using tobacco, especially combustible forms, without abstaining completely from tobacco and nicotine. Some of these measures include switching to safer (lower tar) cigarettes, switching to snus or dipping tobacco, or using a non-tobacco nicotine delivery systems. In recent years, the growing use of electronic cigarettes (or vaping) for smoking cessation, whose long-term safety remains uncertain, has sparked an ongoing controversy among medical and public health between those who seek to restrict and discourage all use until more is known and those who see them as a useful approach for harm reduction, whose risks are most unlikely to equal those of smoking tobacco. "Their usefulness in tobacco harm reduction as a substitute for tobacco products is unclear", but in an effort to decrease tobacco related death and disease, they have a potential to be part of the strategy.

=== Routes of administration ===
==== Needle exchange programmes (NEP) ====
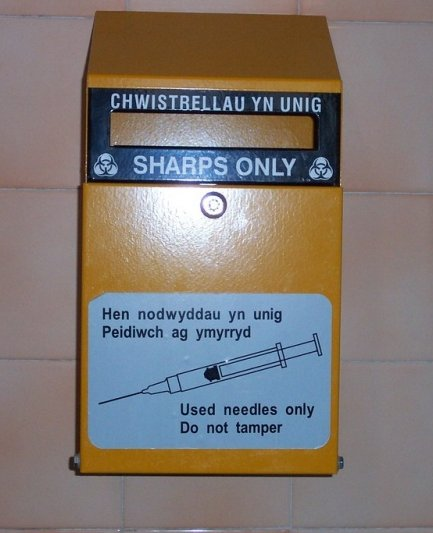
A bin allowing for safe disposal of needles in a public toilet in Caernarfon, Wales

The use of some illicit drugs can involve hypodermic needles. In some areas (notably in many parts of the US), these are available solely by prescription. Where availability is limited, people who use heroin and other substances frequently share the syringes and use them more than once or participate in unsafe practices such as blood flashing. As a result, infections such as HIV or hepatitis C can spread from person to person through the reuse of syringes contaminated with infected blood. The principles of harm reduction propose that syringes should be easily available or at least available through a needle and syringe programmes (NSP). Where syringes are provided in sufficient quantities, rates of HIV are much lower than in places where supply is restricted. In many countries people who use substances are supplied equipment free of charge, others require payment or an exchange of dirty needles for clean ones, hence the name.

A 2010 review found insufficient evidence that NSP prevents transmission of the hepatitis C virus, tentative evidence that it prevents transmission of HIV and sufficient evidence that it reduces self-reported injecting risk behaviour. It has been shown in the many evaluations of needle-exchange programmes that in areas where clean syringes are more available, illegal drug use is no higher than in other areas. Needle exchange programmes have reduced HIV incidence by 33% in New Haven and 70% in New York City.

The Melbourne, Australia inner-city suburbs of Richmond and Abbotsford are locations in which the use and dealing of heroin has been concentrated for a protracted time period. Research organisation the Burnet Institute completed the 2013 'North Richmond Public Injecting Impact Study' in collaboration with the Yarra Drug and Health Forum, City of Yarra and North Richmond Community Health Centre and recommended 24-hour access to sterile injecting equipment due to the ongoing "widespread, frequent and highly visible" nature of illicit drug use in the areas. During the period between 2010 and 2012 a four-fold increase in the levels of inappropriately discarded injecting equipment was documented for the two suburbs. In the local government area the City of Yarra, of which Richmond and Abbotsford are parts of, 1550 syringes were collected each month from public syringe disposal bins in 2012. Furthermore, ambulance callouts for heroin overdoses were 1.5 times higher than for other Melbourne areas in the period between 2011 and 2012 (a total of 336 overdoses), and drug-related arrests in North Richmond were also three times higher than the state average. The Burnet Institute's researchers interviewed health workers, residents and local traders, in addition to observing the drug scene in the most frequented North Richmond public injecting locations.

On 28 May 2013, the Burnet Institute stated in the media that it recommends 24-hour access to sterile injecting equipment in the Melbourne suburb of Footscray after the area's drug culture continues to grow after more than ten years of intense law enforcement efforts. The institute's research concluded that public injecting behaviour is frequent in the area and inappropriately discarding injecting paraphernalia has been found in carparks, parks, footpaths and drives. Furthermore, people who inject drugs have broken open syringe disposal bins to reuse discarded injecting equipment.

The British public body, the National Institute for Health and Care Excellence (NICE), introduced a new recommendation in early April 2014 due to an increase in the presentation of the number of young people who inject steroids at UK needle exchanges. NICE previously published needle exchange guidelines in 2009, in which needle and syringe services are not advised for people under the age of 18 years, but the organisation's director Professor Mike Kelly explained that a "completely different group" of people were presenting at programs. In the updated guidance, NICE recommended the provision of specialist services for "rapidly increasing numbers of steroid users", and that needles should be provided to people under the age of 18—a first for NICE—following reports of 15-year-old steroid injectors seeking to develop their muscles.

===== Supervised injection sites (SIS) =====
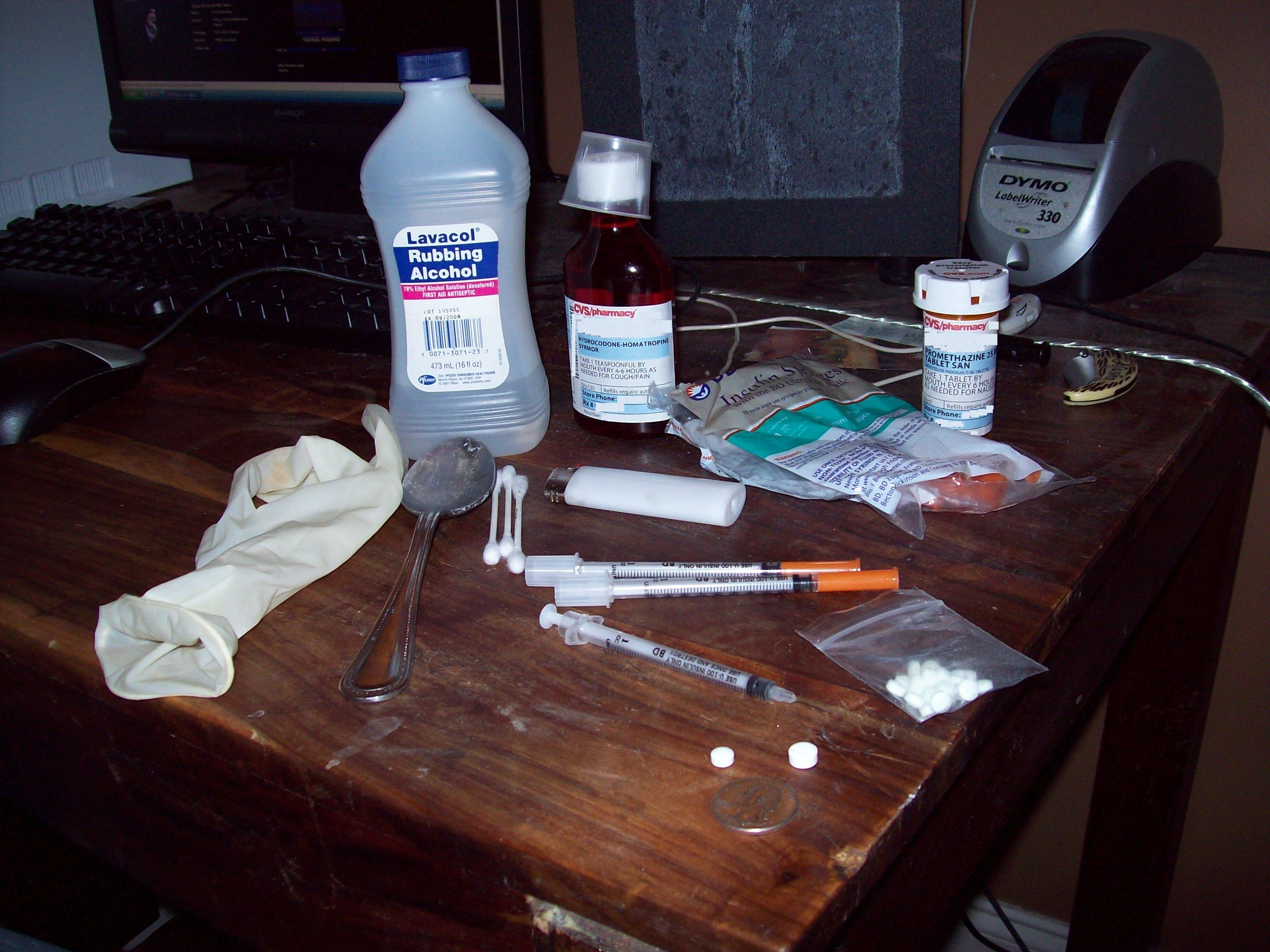
A clandestine kit containing materials to inject drugs

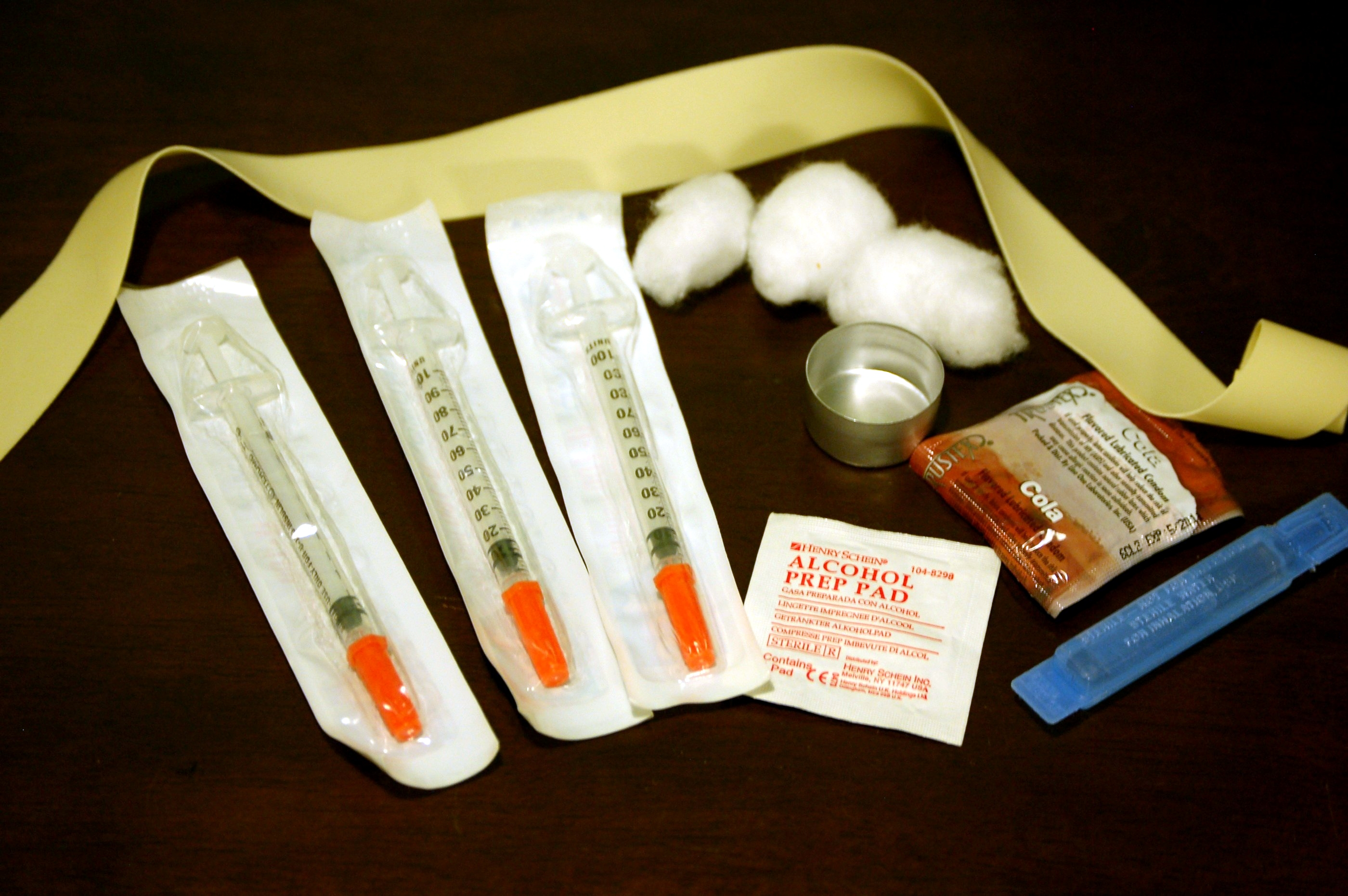
Injection kit obtained from a needle-exchange programme

Supervised injection sites (SIS), or Drug consumption rooms (DCR), are legally sanctioned, medically supervised facilities designed to address public nuisance associated with drug use and provide a hygienic and stress-free environment for drug consumers.

The facilities provide sterile injection equipment, information about drugs and basic health care, treatment referrals, and access to medical staff. Some offer counseling, hygienic and other services of use to itinerant and impoverished individuals. Most programmes prohibit the sale or purchase of illegal drugs. Many require identification cards. Some restrict access to local residents and apply other admission criteria, such as they have to be people who inject substances, but generally in Europe they do not exclude people with substance use disorders who consume their substances through other means.

The Netherlands had the first staffed injection room, although they did not operate under explicit legal support until 1996. Instead, the first center where it was legal to inject drugs was in Berne, Switzerland, opened 1986. In 1994, Germany opened its first site. Although, as in the Netherlands they operated in a "gray area", supported by the local authorities and with consent from the police until the Bundestag provided a legal exemption in 2000.

In Europe, Luxembourg, Spain and Norway have opened facilities after year 2000. Sydney's Medically Supervised Injecting Center (MSIC) was established in May 2001 as a trial and Vancouver's Insite opened in September 2003. In 2010, after a nine-year trial, the Sydney site was confirmed as a permanent public health facility. As of late 2009 there were a total of 92 professionally supervised injection facilities in 61 cities. In North American, as of 2023 there are supervised injection sites operating in a number of Canadian cities, and two in United States. The sites in United States opened in 2021.

The European Monitoring Centre for Drugs and Drug Addiction's latest systematic review from April 2010 did not find any evidence to support concerns that DCR might "encourage drug use, delay treatment entry or aggravate problems of local drug markets." Jürgen Rehm and Benedikt Fischer explained that while evidence show that DCR are successful, that "interpretation is limited by the weak designs applied in many evaluations, often represented by the lack of adequate control groups." Concluding that this "leaves the door open for alternative interpretations of data produced and subsequent ideological debate."

The EMCDDA review noted that research into the effects of the facilities "faces methodological challenges in taking account of the effects of broader local policy or ecological changes", still they concluded "that the facilities reach their target population and provide immediate improvements through better hygiene and safety conditions for injectors." Further that "the availability of safer injecting facilities does not increase levels of drug use or risky patterns of consumption, nor does it result in higher rates of local drug acquisition crime." While its usage is "associated with self-reported reductions in injecting risk behaviour such as syringe sharing, and in public drug use" and "with increased uptake of detoxification and treatment services." However, "a lack of studies, as well as methodological problems such as isolating the effect from other interventions or low coverage of the risk population, evidence regarding DCRs—while encouraging—is insufficient for drawing conclusions with regard to their effectiveness in reducing HIV or hepatitis C virus (HCV) incidence." Concluding with that "there is suggestive evidence from modelling studies that they may contribute to reducing drug-related deaths at a city level where coverage is adequate, the review-level evidence of this effect is still insufficient."

Critics of this intervention, such as drug prevention advocacy organisations, Drug Free Australia and Real Women of Canada point to the most rigorous evaluations, those of Sydney and Vancouver. Two of the centers, in Sydney, Australia and Vancouver, British Columbia, Canada cost $2.7 million and $3 million per annum to operate respectively, yet Canadian mathematical modeling, where there was caution about validity, indicated just one life saved from fatal overdose per annum for Vancouver, while the Drug Free Australia analysis demonstrates the Sydney facility statistically takes more than a year to save one life. The Expert Advisory Committee of the Canadian Government studied claims by journal studies for reduced HIV transmission by Insite but "were not convinced that these assumptions were entirely valid." The Sydney facility showed no improvement in public injecting and discarded needles beyond improvements caused by a coinciding heroin drought, while the Vancouver facility had an observable impact. Drug dealing and loitering around the facilities were evident in the Sydney evaluation, but not evident for the Vancouver facility.

=== Safer supply ===
Safer supply programs prescribe medications (including stimulants, opioids, and benzodiazepines) to people at high risk of overdose. This is meant to provide a safer alternative to an illegal drug supply that contains high levels of fentanyl and other dangerous chemicals. The structure of such programs is more flexible than opioid agonist therapy. The drugs dispensed by these programs can result in intoxication, unlike methadone or buprenorphine. Safer supply projects exist in a number of Canadian cities. Critics of these programs point to the risk of drug diversion and argue that patients should be encouraged to enter drug rehabilitation programs instead of being given drugs.

== Sex ==
=== Safer sex programmes ===
Many schools now provide safer sex education to teen and pre-teen students, who may engage in sexual activity. Since some adolescents are going to have sex, a harm-reductionist approach supports a sexual education which emphasizes the use of protective devices like condoms and dental dams to protect against unwanted pregnancy and the transmission of STIs. This runs contrary to abstinence-only sex education, which teaches that educating children about sex can encourage them to engage in it.

These programmes have been found to decrease risky sexual behaviour and prevent sexually transmitted infections. They also reduce rates of unwanted pregnancies. Abstinence-only programmes do not appear to affect HIV risks in developed countries with no evidence available for other areas.

=== Legalized prostitution ===
Since 1999, some countries have legalized prostitution, such as Germany (2002) and New Zealand (2003). However, in most countries the practice is prohibited. Gathering accurate statistics on prostitution and human trafficking is extremely difficult. This has resulted in proponents of legalization claiming that it reduces organized crime rates while opponents claim exactly the converse. The Dutch prostitution policy, which is one of the most liberal in the world, has gone back and forth on the issue several times. In the period leading up to 2015 up to a third of officially sanctioned work places had been closed down again after reports of human trafficking. Prostitutes themselves are generally opposed to what they see as "theft of their livelihood".

Legal prostitution means prostitutes can contact police in instances of abuse or violence without fear of arrest or prosecution because of what they are doing being illegal. A legal and regulated system can also provide licensed brothels as opposed to prostitutes working on the streets, in which the owners or staff of the premises can call the police in instances of violence against sex workers without fear of workers or the business facing criminal charges or being shut down. Legal and regulated prostitution can require prostitutes to undergo regular health checks for sexually transmitted infections (STIs) by law. Sex workers in Nevada for instance have to get monthly tests for syphilis and HIV and weekly tests for gonorrhea and chlamydia.

=== Sex-work and HIV ===
Despite the depth of knowledge of HIV/AIDS, rapid transmission has occurred globally in sex workers. The relationship between these two variables greatly increases the risk of transmission among these populations, and also to anyone associated with them, such as their sexual partners, their children, and eventually the population at large.

Many street-level harm-reduction strategies have succeeded in reducing HIV transmission in injecting drug users and sex-workers. HIV education, HIV testing, condom use, and safer-sex negotiation greatly decreases the risk to the disease. Peer education as a harm reduction strategy has especially reduced the risk of HIV infection, such as in Chad, where this method was the most cost-effective per infection prevented.

Decriminalisation as a harm-reduction strategy gives the ability to treat substance use disorder solely as a public health issue rather than a criminal activity. This enables other harm-reduction strategies to be employed, which results in a lower incidence of HIV infection.

One of the first harm reduction models was called the "Mersey Harm Reduction Model" in 1980s Liverpool, and the success of utilizing outreach workers, distribution of education, and providing clean equipment to drug users was shown in the fact that an HIV epidemic did not happen in Mersey.

The AIDS epidemic, which began in the 80s and peaked in 1995, further complicated the politicization of drug users and drug use in the US. The implementation of harm reduction faced much resistance within the US due to the demonization of particular drugs associated with stigmatized groups, such as sex workers and drug-injecting users.

== Drug liberalization ==
Drug liberalization as a harm-reduction strategy gives the ability to treat substance use disorder solely as a public health issue rather than a criminal activity. This enables other harm-reduction strategies to be employed, which results in a lower incidence of HIV infection.

== Criticism ==
Critics, such as Drug Free America Foundation and other members of network International Task Force on Strategic Drug Policy, state that a risk posed by harm reduction is by creating the perception that certain behaviours can be partaken of safely, such as illicit drug use, that it may lead to an increase in that behaviour by people who would otherwise be deterred. The signatories of the drug prohibitionist network International Task Force on Strategic Drug Policy stated that they oppose drug use harm reduction "...strategies as endpoints that promote the false notion that there are safe or responsible ways to use drugs. That is, strategies in which the primary goal is to enable drug users to maintain addictive, destructive, and compulsive behavior by misleading users about some drug risks while ignoring others."

In 2008, the World Federation Against Drugs stated that while "...some organizations and local governments actively advocate the legalization of drugs and promote policies such as "harm reduction" that accept drug use and do not help people who use substances to become free from substance use. This undermines the international efforts to limit the supply of and demand for drugs." The Federation states that harm reduction efforts often end up being "drug legalization or other inappropriate relaxation efforts, a policy approach that violates the UN Conventions."

Critics furthermore reject harm reduction measures for allegedly trying to establish certain forms of drug use as acceptable in society. The Drug Prevention Network of Canada states that harm reduction has "...come to represent a philosophy in which illicit substance use is seen as largely unpreventable, and increasingly, as a feasible and acceptable lifestyle as long as use is not 'problematic'", an approach which can increase "acceptance of drug use into the mainstream of society". They say harm reduction "...sends the wrong message to ... children and youth" about drug use. In 2008, the Declaration of World Forum Against Drugs criticized harm reduction policies that "...accept drug use and do not help drug users to become free from drug abuse", which the group say undermines "...efforts to limit the supply of and demand for drugs." They state that harm reduction should not lead to less efforts to reduce drug demand.

Pope Benedict XVI criticised harm reduction policies with regards to HIV/AIDS, saying that it was "a tragedy that cannot be overcome by money alone, that cannot be overcome through the distribution of condoms, which even aggravates the problems". This position was in turn widely criticised for misrepresenting and oversimplifying the role of condoms in preventing infections.

A March 2025 study exploring the association of safer supply and decriminalization policy with opioid overdose outcomes in British Columbia, Canada, found that neither policy "appeared to mitigate the opioid crisis, and both were associated with an increase in opioid overdose hospitalizations."

== See also ==
- Aubri Esters
- Bluelight (web forum)
- Demand reduction
- Drug policy
- Drug-related crime
- Erowid
- Intoxication defense
- Harm reduction in the United States
- Low-threshold treatment programs
- Mitigation
- Proportionality (law)
- PsychonautWiki
- Punitive damages
- Right to an effective remedy
- Supervised injection site
- Supply reduction
- Victims' rights
