= Mood congruence =

Consistency between one's emotional state and their circumstances

In psychology, mood congruence is the consistency between a person's emotional state with the broader situations and circumstances being experienced by the person at that time. By contrast, mood incongruence occurs when the individual's reactions or emotional state appear to be in conflict with the situation. In the context of psychosis, hallucinations and delusions may be considered mood congruent (such as feelings of personal inadequacy, guilt, or worthlessness during a bipolar disorder depressive episode) or incongruent.

== Background and theorists ==
An important consideration to the difference between mood congruence and mood dependent (or state-dependent) memory is the determination that one cannot make accurate assumptions about the emotional state of a memory during the encoding process. Therefore, the memory that is recalled is not dependent on the affective state during encoding. Another important difference is that there are multiple memories that can be recalled while in particular mood states that go across contexts and cues that may or may not recall only one specific memory.

=== Gordon Bower ===
An example of this is demonstrated through a theory proposed by Gordon Bower called the associative network theory of feeling effects. Bower's theory explains the multiple associations of memory congruence within the paradigm of the nodes of the semantic memory network. The associative network theory of feeling effects explains how emotions are connected to many different words that represent the given emotion and represent different meanings for different individuals. Like with semantic memory networks, the nodes that represent particular emotions are triggered by the words that invoke that emotion. For instance, the word 'dog' can trigger different emotional nodes that represent different word strings and meaningful associations based on different and individual experiences. For a person who has only had positive interactions with the word 'dog', the person would subsequently connect to the emotional nodes that represented positive meanings such as dog = pet = happiness in childhood.

Therefore, Bower's theory determined that not only are particular words linked to other words or phrases that represented similar affects, but that emotions in themselves had their own representative nodes distinct to their affective nature within the semantic memory network. The existence of distinct affective nodes thus explains how multiple positive or negative connotations can be conjured from memory when stimuli is presented that is of negative or positive valance. The significance of how positive or negative associations and their represented meanings in the semantic memory networks of individuals who experience the effects of memory congruence has been demonstrated in various word association studies in which the common methodology is to take samples of individuals that represent both positive, negative and neutral affective states and determine which words they recall most when presented with words representing both positive and negative connotations. In these studies the results more often than not represented the findings that the sample of participants representing positive mood states recalled more positively connoted words, and those who represented the negatively affected group recalled more negatively connoted words. However, an interesting portion of the studies were the groups that represented the neutral group that neither had feelings of negativity or positivity. These groups recalled more positive words than negative words.

Another aspect of Bower's theory in mood-congruence in memory is that the rate of occurrence of particular emotionally represented nodes may become implicitly primed. Even if an individual is not paying full attention to the event in which the affective priming had occurred. Affective memory nodes are then able to connect to a further multitude of inferred or generalized meaning where the congruent recall may not be of a specific autobiographical event. The recall may instead form a generalized representation or prime the associations of future episodes or learning to be particularly positively or negatively biased. The priming explanation also gives relevance to the idea that those who are depressed recall more negatively congruent memories than those who are not depressed. The semantic memory paradigm also adds representational meaning to the theories of eye-witness testimony and false memories. In memory congruence of current emotional states to memory, one may not remember details of situation due to a high level of emotional arousal. This is where the generalization of previously primed connections 'fill in the gaps' of these details to form misrepresented or false memories.

=== Theory of emotional valence ===
Conversely, there are theories of mood-congruency in memory recall that explain the instances and studies that represent incongruences. One such theory is the circumflex model assumption, or the theory of emotional valence. The theory of valence in regards to mood-congruency and memory recall is that the nature (positive or negative) of the emotion at encoding is congruent with the nature of the emotion in which the memory is to be recalled. The theory of valence has had both significant and contradictory findings. The significant findings are similar to those that are represented in the studies mentioned previously within the paradigm of semantic memory. The contradiction of the valence theory is in studies where the moods of the participants were found to represent mood-incongruence. The incongruence is especially particular in findings of valence asymmetry, in which those who were in a current negative mood recalled more positively associated words or memories. A proposed reason for this occurrence is that the individuals who are recalling positive memories while in negatively affective states are confounded by their personal attitudes, levels of self-esteem and their world views. Therefore, it has been found that samples of individuals who have higher levels of self-esteem or more positively world views tend to remember more positive events even when in a negatively affective state. These people are able to thus control their own retrieval processes than individuals who have lower self-esteem or negative world views.

=== Theory of categorical conception ===
In opposition to the conundrum of the valence theories of mood-congruence, proponents such as Paula Niedenthal propose a theory of categorical conception. The theory of categorical conception argues that mood-congruence of current affective states and memory recall are subject to attentional strengths and deficits in category matching. Instead of all emotions being either negative or positive, as represented in the theory of valence, emotions are seen as distinct categories. The theory of categorical conception assumes that an individual's current affective state determines what they pay attention to. The attention can be implicitly or explicitly encoded. For instance, if an individual is sad, they will pay more attention to the aspects of their environment that are congruent with sadness such as melancholy or dreary weather. Therefore, if someone is frequently depressed, they are more likely to pay attention to representations of their depression and create a larger memory repertoire of depressed memories than happy memories. Being that the person has a higher number of encoded memories that have negative or sad connotations, they are then more likely to experience a higher level of mood congruent memories than more happy memories.

=== Social psychology connection ===
Moreover, in social psychology, "mood congruency" refers to a cognitive mechanism that explains a wide variety of mood effects in which there is a match in affective valence between people's mood and their responses. Cognitive therapy pays special attention to mood congruence due to the use of mood repair strategies, which are meant to shift an individual from a negative mood to a positive one.

Examples:

- Congruent mood—smiling while feeling happy.
- Non-congruent mood—smiling while feeling anxious.
- Inappropriate affect—laughing while describing a loved one's funeral, for instance.

Mood Congruency is strongest when people try to recall personally meaningful episodes, because such events were most likely to be colored by their moods.
