= Psychological impact of discrimination on health =

Healthcare phenomenon

The psychological impact of discrimination on health refers to the cognitive pathways through which discrimination impacts mental and physical health in marginalized, and lower-status groups (e.g. racial and sexual minorities). Research on the relationship between discrimination and health grew in the 1990s, when researchers proposed that persisting racial/ethnic disparities in health outcomes could be explained by racial or ethnic differences in experiences with discrimination. While much research focuses on the interactions between interpersonal discrimination and health, researchers studying discrimination and health in the United States have proposed that institutional discrimination and cultural racism also create conditions that contribute to persisting racial and economic health disparities.

A stress and coping framework is applied to investigate how discrimination influences health outcomes in racial, gender, and sexual minorities, as well as on immigrant and indigenous populations. The research indicates that experiences of discrimination are associated with worse physical and mental health conditions and lead to increased participation in unhealthy behaviors. Evidence of the inverse link between discrimination and health has been observed consistently across multiple population groups and various cultural and national contexts. Such observations have been studied and organized into theoretical frameworks in the field of public health to work towards understanding and achieving health equity.

== From discrimination to health ==
=== Understanding frameworks ===
There are several models that provide explanation to how stress impacts individuals and understanding on where that stress comes from. Three primary frameworks are the Minority Stress Theory, Allostatic Load, and Social Determinants of Health. Each of these are highly referenced in psychological and health disparities research.

The Minority Stress Theory created by Ilan Meyer describes the added stress experienced by minority groups in both experienced discrimination, and fear of being discriminated against. This stress is higher in groups who experience prejudice and exclusion based on factors such as race, ethnicity, or sexual orientation. With higher levels of stress, these groups are subjected to negative health affects that other people outside of these groups are not.

In Allostatic Load, this framework describes how constant stress and exposure to stressors has harmful repercussions on the body. This refers to both mental and physical health. Similarly, those stressors are more common in minority groups who are subjected to frequent experiences of distress.

One final framework that is beneficial to understanding the psychological impact of discrimination on health is the Social Determinants of Health Model. This brings forward intersectionality and the idea that a person is shaped from their background and is unique to themselves. Categories of gender, race, economic status, environment, etc. are all factors in this model which contribute to an individuals access to health and experience receiving medical care.

=== Stress response ===
Research conceptualizes discrimination as stress-inducing experiences that have negative consequences on mental and physical health, as well as health behaviors. In experimental studies, stress in response to discrimination has been measured using a range of both psychological (e.g. perceived stress) and physiological (e.g. cardiovascular reactivity) indicators; evidence indicates that this heightened stress response is associated with poorer mental and physical health and impaired decision-making in relation to health behaviors such as substance use or visits to the emergency department.

Some researchers argue that everyday experiences with discrimination can cause chronic and cumulative stress that contributes to physical strain on the body. Instances of discrimination tend to be ambiguous and unpredictable, which research suggests may be particularly harmful. Studies show that anticipating discrimination, experiencing stress as a result of hypervigilance and anxiousness, and ruminating over the experience of discrimination can aggravate and prolong the adverse impacts of discrimination on health.

The impact of discrimination-related stress can be long-term. For example, one study on Black adolescents found that perceived discrimination between age 16-18 predicted stress hormone levels, blood pressure, inflammation, and BMI at age 20. The cumulative physiological impact of chronic stress was demonstrated by the longitudinal study, Brody et al., which showed that greater levels of perceived discrimination during adolescence were linked to heightened allostatic load in early adulthood. Furthermore, the study indicated that protective parenting throughout adolescence acted as a buffer against the detrimental health impacts of stress connected to prejudice.

=== Health behaviors ===
Discrimination impacts health by inducing negative emotions and lowering self-control, which increases participation in unhealthy behaviors such as smoking, alcohol and substance use, reduced physical activity, and overeating. Research also indicates that discrimination lowers participation in preventative care behaviors, such as cancer screening, diabetes management, and condom use, which are important for maintaining overall health. Disenfranchised groups are concentrated in communities with limited resources due to racial and ethnic residential segregation, an institutional form of discrimination. In addition to exposing people to higher levels of stress and risk-promoting situations, these surroundings frequently lack access to leisure areas, wholesome food alternatives, and high-quality healthcare. This systemic disadvantage emphasizes how social environment shapes personal health chances and choices by reinforcing the connection between discrimination and unhealthy behaviors.

Yin Paradies (2006) conducted a thorough meta-analysis of 138 empirical research and discovered a continuous correlation between self-reported racism and unhealthy behaviors. According to the research, being exposed to racism was substantially linked to higher rates of alcohol and tobacco use, lower levels of physical activity, and lower health care usage. This comprehensive data emphasizes how prejudice not only has an impact on mental and emotional health but also leads to behavioral patterns that jeopardize long-term health results.

== Interpersonal discrimination ==
=== Measurement ===
Studies assessing the link between interpersonal, or individualized, discrimination and health have been both experimental and observational in nature. Studies have explored this relationship by manipulating perceptions of discrimination in a number of ways, including exposing participants to racist film clips, asking them to write about their prior experiences with discrimination, and providing them with articles detailing discrimination against their ingroup. Observational studies make use of large datasets such as the National Survey of Black Americans and the New Zealand Health Survey to make deductions about the relationship between discrimination and health.

In several cases, perceived discrimination is measured by asking participants to self-report on the frequency with which they experience discrimination daily (chronic); the number of times that they've been the target of severe discrimination (acute); the amount of discrimination experience over their lifetime (lifetime); or whether they had recently experienced discrimination (recent). Various scales have been developed to capture different types of discrimination, with over 90% of scales designed by researchers in the U.S. Racism, for instance, is often measured using the Perceived Racism Scale, the Schedule of Racists Events, the Index of Race Related Stress, and the Racism and Life Experiences Scale.

Across studies, there is consistent evidence for the negative impact of discrimination on mental health and health-related behaviors, but a meta-analysis by Elizabeth Pascoe and Laura Richman Smart in 2009 examined 134 samples which show evidence of an inverse link between discrimination and physical health. Comparisons between the impact of chronic, lifetime, and recent experiences of discrimination on mental health shows recent discrimination to have a stronger negative impact than lifetime discrimination; differences in impact based on type of discrimination measured were absent for physical health.

=== Mental health ===
A meta-analysis of over 300 articles published between 1983 and 2013 finds evidence of a strong association between discrimination and poor mental health. According to the research, there was a substantial increase in psychological distress, sadness, anxiety, and other signs of poor mental health among those who reported experiencing racial prejudice. The study's conclusions, which highlight the ways in which interpersonal and systemic discrimination fuel health inequalities among racial and ethnic groups, lend credence to the expanding understanding of racism as a significant social predictor of health. This meta-analysis supports the claim that racism has real, detrimental consequences on mental health and that systemic measures are required to address racial disparities in healthcare, policy, and society at large by methodically analyzing data from several research. Specifically, perceived discrimination has been linked to a range of mental health outcomes including depression, anxiety, posttraumatic stress disorder, psychological distress, positive and negative affect, and general well-being. Self-reported discrimination has also been linked to DSM-5 (Diagnostic and Statistical Manual of Mental Disorders) psychological disorders such as psychosis, paranoia, and eating disorders. Some studies suggest that the relationship between perceived discrimination and clinical mental illness becomes stronger as perceptions of discrimination and instances of experienced discrimination increases. A meta-analysis conducted by Pascoe and Richman Smart in 2009 concluded that the link between discrimination and mental health is a broad phenomenon, with targets of discrimination experiencing poorer mental health regardless of ethnicity or gender. Additionally, the research demonstrated that unfavorable psychological consequences, such as elevated anxiety, psychological distress, and depressive symptoms, were consistently linked to perceived prejudice. The investigators also indicated that stress reactions and coping mechanisms had a role in mediating these effects, underscoring the influence of both behavioral and physiological processes on health outcomes.

However, a more recently published meta-analysis, whose samples were primarily U.S. based, finds evidence of a moderating effect of ethnicity, such that the link between discrimination and mental health appears to be stronger in Asian Americans and Latino Americans, as compared to Black Americans. The protocol itself, Paradies et al. (2013), does not provide results, but it does point out that previous studies show differences in the ways that various racial and ethnic groups encounter and absorb racism, which might influence their psychological reactions. According to the authors, certain groups, such as Asian Americans and Latino Americans, may react to prejudice with increased psychological discomfort because of things like cultural stigma around mental health, acculturation variations, or different coping mechanisms. This implies that ethnicity may serve as a moderating factor, influencing how much discrimination affects mental health outcomes. Aiming to further investigate these complex impacts, the proposed meta-analysis highlights the necessity of subgroup studies in order to comprehend the diversity of experiences among racial and ethnic minorities in the United States.

=== Physical health ===
Multiple meta-analyses indicate that perceived discrimination is associated with a range of negative physical health outcomes such as heart disease, obesity, hypertension, ambulatory blood pressure, breast cancer, diabetes, and respiratory problems. Perceived discrimination also shows association with indicators of forthcoming health problems, such as increased allostatic load, shorter telomere length, inflammation, cortisol dysregulation, and coronary artery calcification. Some studies suggest that perceived discrimination could contribute to increased cardiovascular risk as a result of experiencing higher systolic and diastolic blood pressure during the day and higher ambulatory blood pressure at night in response to discrimination.

Although the association between discrimination and blood pressure has been found in multiple studies, a 2012 analysis of 22 studies by Couto and colleagues only found evidence of this link in 30% of the analyzed studies. Krieger (2014) approaches this issue by stressing that a more comprehensive socio-ecological framework is necessary to comprehend how prejudice affects physical health, including blood pressure, cardiovascular risk, and allostatic load. The article contends that by repeatedly triggering the stress response, both brief and prolonged exposure to discrimination can dysregulate bodily systems. This physiological deterioration over time adds to the so-called allostatic load, which includes a number of indicators such as blood pressure, cortisol levels, and inflammatory markers. Krieger also notes that discrepancies in results, like those reported by Couto et al., might be caused by variations in study design, sample demographics, discriminatory measures, and whether or not research takes interpersonal encounters into consideration as opposed to structural forms of discrimination.

== Institutional racism in the United States ==
Institutional (or structural) racism refers to the policies and practices embedded in the legal, economic, social, and political systems of society that creates differential access to resources, opportunities, and services based on race. In the United States, studies have examined connections between institutional racism and health, particularly through residential segregation and environmental racism. Wildeman and Wang (2017) go on to emphasize how mass imprisonment is a potent structural racism mechanism that has serious negative effects on public health. Through limiting access to healthcare, upsetting families, and subjecting jailed populations to circumstances that promote chronic stress and poor health outcomes, their study shows how the disproportionate imprisonment of Black and Latinx people exacerbates health inequities.

=== Residential segregation ===
Residential segregation in the U.S. resulted from federal policies and government-supported private practices such as redlining, zoning, and restrictive covenants, which prevented racially integrated neighborhoods. Although residential segregation was made illegal in 1968 through the Fair Housing Act, it persists in many cases, with Black Americans experiencing the highest rates of segregation as compared to Hispanics and Asian Americans. The historical segregation of Black Americans has been identified as a fundamental contributor to persisting Black-White disparities in adverse birth outcomes, health behaviors, and chronic diseases such as asthma, diabetes, and hypertension.

Segregation contributes to health disparities by creating physical and social conditions that increase exposure to environmental pollutants, contribute to the prevalence of chronic and acute psychosocial stressors, and make it more difficult for residents to practice healthy behaviors. For example, Landrine and Corral (2009) identified three potential pathways through which racial segregation contributes to disparities: Black neighborhoods, relative to White neighborhoods, are equipped with inferior healthcare facilities and less competent physicians; exposed to higher levels of pollution and toxins in the environment; and provided greater access to fast foods but lower access to recreational facilities and supermarkets. Other researchers argue that segregation leads to the creation of neighborhoods with high levels of poverty and lower quality education that receive less government support.

Studies have indicated that segregation is associated with poorer overall health. More specifically, residents of segregated neighborhoods have been found to be at increased risk for tuberculosis, intentional harm, and later-stage breast and lung cancer diagnosis. Segregation has also been associated with negative health consequences for Black women, such as increased risk for obesity, low birth weight, preterm birth, and stillbirths.

=== Environmental racism ===
Current research shows that people of color, low-income communities, ethnic minorities, and indigenous populations are more likely to be exposed to pollution, toxins, and chemicals as a result of their proximity to industrial and military activity and consumer practices. For example, research conducted in Warren Country, NC shows that 75% of their hazardous waste landfills are located in Black communities, despite the fact that Black Americans only make up 20% of the county's population. This pattern is present in most parts of the U.S.; 40% of the country's landfills are located in Black communities. Communities of color not only live close to landfills, but they are also more likely than their white counterparts to live near medical waste incinerators, diesel bus depots, and Superfund sites. Research shows that living in proximity with sources of air, water, and soil pollution is associated with asthma, eczema, cancer, chemical poisoning, heart disease, and neurological disorders in Black Americans.

Black communities have also been exposed to lead, DDT, and a handful of other noxious chemicals as a result of the U.S. Environmental Protection Agency's failure to enforce safety regulations (for examples, see Flint Michigan Water Crisis; Altgeld Gardens Homes; Dickinson County, TN toxic wells; North Birmingham, AL coke plants). Lead contamination is known to be particularly harmful to children and pregnant women as it can lead to anemia, kidney failure, brain damage, fetal death, and premature delivery. A 1984 study by the Illinois Public Health Sector also found that exposure to toxins at the Altgeld Gardens Home led to higher rates of prostate, bladder, and lung cancer, as well as higher rates of child brain tumors, asthma, ringworm, and congenital anomaly.

== Impact of discrimination on various social groups ==
=== U.S. racial minorities ===
Racial minorities in the U.S. include Black Americans, Asian Americans, Latino Americans, and Native Americans. Members belonging to these racial minority groups often face discrimination in daily interactions and situations. These repeated experiences with discrimination has been shown to lead to heightened stress responses in racial minorities, which leads to poorer mental and physical health, and increased participation in harmful health-behaviors. These frequent experiences of perceived discrimination have serious deleterious effects on mental and physical health, according to a meta-analysis conduction by Pascoe and Smart Richman (2009). According to the study, psychological discomfort, including signs of anxiety, despair, and poor self-esteem, is consistently linked to perceived prejudice. Chronic exposure to discriminatory treatment can physiologically cause greater stress responses, including elevated cortisol levels and increased allostatic load, which can lead to long-term health problems including cardiovascular disease and hypertension. The review also found that those who are discriminated against are more prone to use unhealthy coping mechanisms including drinking alcohol, smoking, and other harmful habits.

==== Black Americans ====
Black Americans report experiencing the most discrimination out of all racial/ethnic groups in the U.S. They also tend to fare worse, compared to other racial/ethnic groups, when it comes to physical illnesses such as heart disease and cancer incidence. Black Americans report experiencing discrimination in a range of situations (e.g. healthcare visits, job applications and interviews, interactions with the police) and through microaggressions and racial slurs. Perceptions of racial discrimination has been linked with psychological distress, hypertension, depression, harmful health behaviors (e.g. alcohol abuse), and a range of chronic illnesses in Black Americans. A meta-analysis of 19 studies published between 2003 and 2013 on the link between perceived discrimination and the health of Black women finds that perceptions of discrimination is associated with preterm birth and low birth weight. According to the research, racial prejudice is a long-term stressor that might lead to these unfavorable birth outcomes by causing physiological reactions including inflammation and elevated cortisol levels. Additionally, it highlights that maternal health and pregnancy outcomes might be adversely affected by both firsthand experiences of prejudice and the expectation of discriminatory treatment.

See section on institutional racism in the United States for additional health consequences of discrimination on Black Americans.

==== Asian Americans ====
In a 2007 survey of over 2000 Asian Americans, 56% of the respondents reported experiencing discrimination because of their race, skin color, or nationality. Gee et al. (2007) conducted a countrywide survey that demonstrates how widespread racial prejudice is among Asian Americans. According to the study, these kinds of events were also substantially linked to a higher risk of developing long-term health issues, such as respiratory and cardiovascular disorders. Those who reported more frequent or severe discrimination were particularly affected by these health inequalities. The study emphasizes how racism contributes to Asian Americans' physiological stress and long-term health issues, serving as both a social injustice and a serious public health concern.

A meta-analysis of 14 studies published between 1980 and 2011 shows that perceptions of discrimination are associated with depressive symptoms, cardiovascular disease, respiratory problems, obesity, and diabetes in Asian Americans. According to Nadimpalli and Hutchinson (2012), these correlations show how profoundly racial prejudice, whether overt or covert, may affect Asian American people' physical and emotional well-being. As a chronic stressor, discrimination can cause biological stress responses, which can lead to the onset and worsening of chronic health disorders, according to the review. Furthermore, the authors note that stress brought on by prejudice might result in negative coping mechanisms like drug abuse or unhealthful eating habits, which raise illnesses' risk even more. The report also highlights the underutilization of healthcare services and cultural shame among Asian Americans, which may exacerbate health outcomes and mask the actual scope of these inequalities.

A review of 62 studies also found that Asian Americans who report experiencing discrimination tend to suffer from poor mental and physical health and participate in harmful health behaviors. According to Gee et al. (2009), who examined a wide range of studies, there is consistent evidence that racial discrimination is strongly linked to higher psychological distress, including feelings of anxiety, sadness, and low self-esteem. Discrimination is also linked in the review to physical health problems including chronic pain, high blood pressure, and other stress-related ailments. According to the study, prejudice may have indirect impacts on health in addition to these direct ones by encouraging unhealthy coping strategies including drinking, smoking, and eating poorly. The authors stress that these results are a part of a larger pattern of cumulative disadvantage that Asian Americans experience in healthcare and society, rather than being isolated occurrences.

==== Latino Americans ====
Latinos living in the U.S. report experiencing discrimination because of their language, accent, skin color, facial feature and appearance. A review of 33 studies on the topic reveals that perceived discrimination is associated to poorer mental health and health-related decisions in Latinos residing in the U.S. Latinos who came to the United States at a younger age are at a higher rate of developing mental health issues due to the discrimination they face at a younger age. While Latino immigrants who come to the United States at a later age have a lower risk than non-Latinos of developing a mental health disorder. However, the review did not find evidence of a robust relationship between perceived discrimination and physical health.

Research shows that Latino college students are more likely to be accused of theft, cheating, or breaking the law, which causes them to experience more stress. Perceived racial discrimination in those instances have been associated with poorer mental health, including experiencing psychological distress, suicidal ideations, anxiety, and depression.

==== Native Americans ====
The colonization of the United States constituted systemic efforts to destroy Native American culture and societies, including religious persecution, the implementation of boarding schools that sought to eradicate their languages and customs, and the mass adoption of Native children by non-Native families. These experiences of discrimination, unique to indigenous populations, are thought to be transmitted generationally and influence health outcomes in individuals with Native American ancestry. Thus, perceptions of discrimination in Native Americans tend to be measured in terms of historical trauma, which is the extent to which Indigenous people experience discrimination as a result of the collective history of violence perpetrated against Native Americans during the colonization process. Historical trauma is measured using the Historical Loss Scale, which captures the frequency at which indigenous individuals think about the loss of, for example, their land, language, and culture; and it is usually followed by the Historical Loss Associated Symptoms Scale, which captures how indigenous individuals feel about these losses. Studies examining the relationship between historical trauma and health in Native Americans find that perceptions of discrimination are associated with increased participation in unhealthy behaviors (e.g. alcohol abuse), a range of chronic diseases, PTSD, and psychological distress. Studies investigating the relationship in Indigenous adolescents finds that perceptions of discrimination is associated with early substance use, suicidal ideation, anger, and aggression.

=== Sexual minorities (LGBTQIA+) ===
LGBTQ+ individuals tend to be victims of bullying, harassment, and family rejection. Bullying and harassment in school on the basis of sexual orientation has been linked to negative mental health (increased depression and lower self-esteem) and education-related outcomes (increased school absences and lower performance). Family rejection has also been linked to poorer mental health outcomes, including increases in anxiety, depression and suicidal attempts, and negative health behaviors, such as substance use and risky sex behavior. Some researchers also argue that the higher prevalence of clinical mental disorders in the LGBTQ+ population can be understood as a consequence of the discrimination experienced in their daily environments and interactions.

LGBTQ+ people of color tend to be targets of both racism and heterosexism, which independently predicts depression, but associations between discrimination and suicidal ideation has only been found in relation to heterosexism. LGBTQ+ individuals report experiencing discrimination during job searches and interactions with the police. It is important to recognize how intersectionality plays a role in this community as well.

Societal rejection of the LGBTQ+ community also tend to manifest in the form of internalized homophobia, which arises in LGBTQ+ individuals as a result of socialization into the belief that homosexuality is immoral and wrong. Multiple meta-analyses find that internalized homophobia is associated with demoralization, guilt, suicidal ideation and attempts, sexual identity development, self-esteem, depression, psychological distress, physical health, adherence to traditional gender roles, issues with sexual intimacy, and difficulties coming out. Although stigma and discrimination also show association with the aforementioned psychological and psychosocial issues, internalized homophobia has been found to be the most reliable predictor of mental and physical health issues in LGBTQ+ communities.

Research on the impact of sexual assault on health in women populations find that targets of sexual harassment experience a range of mental health outcomes– including depression, anxiety, fear, guilt, shame, anger, and PTSD– and physical health problems such as headaches, digestive system issues, and sleep disorders. Research relating assault to health in women populations offers a glimpse as to the potential impact of assault on sexual minorities, who are more likely to be victims of physical and sexual assault relative to non-sexual minorities.

=== Elderly population ===
Discrimination against the elderly population has been document in healthcare and employment settings, where elderly individuals tend to devalued and the targets of ageist stereotypes. For example, doctors tend to prescribe milder treatments for elderly individuals whom they are likely to perceive as physically and psychologically frail. Elderly populations in the UK also experience discrimination in the form of neglect and financial exploitation. A meta-analysis of U.S.- and UK-based studies on the impact of ageism found associations with poorer mental health, well-being, physical and cognitive functioning, and survival chances. Research also finds that exposure to ageist stereotypes reduces memory performance, self-efficacy, and willingness to live and increases cardiovascular reactivity.

== Coping mechanisms ==
Research identifies a few potential moderators of the impact of discrimination on health such as strength of ethnic identity, social network, and coping strategies.

=== Social network ===
Research shows that having a social network to rely on during difficult times could lead to increased accessibility to resources such as health care, medicine, and high-nutrient food. The benefits of having a social network are exemplified through community help programs that provide a safe place. Such organized groups are beneficial to connect people facing similar circumstances and ease concerns of isolation or stress that impacts one's mental health. This is helpful for communities of all sorts, as well as school programs helping young students talk about their feelings. Seeking social support following discrimination experiences has also been associated with lower levels of depressions.

=== Racial/ethnic identity ===
Social identity theory suggests that individuals are social beings who derive benefits from group identification and belonging, which could act as a buffer against the discrimination. Evidence of the potential for racial/ethnic identification to moderate the relationship between discrimination and health comes from research on large samples of Latino and Filipino American samples, which found that the relationship between discrimination and mental health was weaker for individuals higher in racial/ethnic identification.

On the other hand, self-categorization theory indicates that higher levels of identification may lead to increased awareness and anticipation of discrimination, which consequently elicit negative emotions. Research in support of this relationship was found in samples of Asian American college students who report lower levels of positive emotions after being asked to imagine an incident of racial discrimination. A meta-analysis of 51 studies and a review of the literature investigating the potential moderating effect of racial/ethnic identity reveals that the association between discrimination and physical health is weaker in individuals who are committed to their racial/ethnic identity. They also find that, in individuals who are still exploring their racial/ethnic identity, associations between discrimination and poorer mental health and risky health behaviors was stronger.

=== Coping strategies ===
Responses to discrimination can vary from anger suppression, avoidance, and confrontation to advocacy, seeking social support, and making changes to the self. Research sorts coping strategies into two categories: problem-focused coping, which are strategies that take a direct approach to tackling the experience of discrimination (e.g. cognitive reframing or support seeking), and emotion-focused coping, which are strategies that seek to reduce psychological distress experienced from discrimination (e.g. avoidance or distraction). The literature on coping strategies indicates that individuals usually use a combination of both problem-focused and emotion-focused strategies, but that problem-focused coping tends to be more effective and adaptive.

Studies exploring the moderating effects of problem- and emotion-focused coping strategies on the relationship between discrimination and health finds mixed evidence. Research on samples of Mexican adolescents and Asian international students indicate that problem-focused coping weakens the relationship between discrimination and self-esteem while emotion-focused coping strengthens the association between discrimination and depression. Similarly, research on Black Americans finds emotion-focused coping, in the form of anger suppression, to be associated with elevated blood pressure levels in Black Americans. However, research on samples of African American college students, Mexican adolescents, and Southeast Asians finds the reverse association: emotion-focused coping was found to weaken the negative impact of discrimination on self-esteem and life-satisfaction in African Americans, on mental health and health-behaviors in Mexican youths, and on depression in Southeast Asians.

Coping strategies can also be adaptive (e.g. positive reframing, acceptance, planning) or maladaptive (e.g. denial, self-blame, distraction). In a population of college students, research finds that adaptive coping is associated with decreased tendency to overeat in response to discrimination experiences while maladaptive coping is associated with an increased tendency to overeat. Research also finds evidence of the benefits of adaptive coping strategies in a sample of Black female college students in which they found active coping to be associated with lower systolic and diastolic blood pressure. A meta-analysis of 9 studies investigating the relationship between coping strategies and health suggests that problem-focused and adaptive coping strategies are more likely to buffer the impact of discrimination on health than emotion-focused and maladaptive strategies.
