= Affect measures =

Methods of studying emotion and mood

Affect measures (measures of affect or measures of emotion) are used in the study of human affect (including emotions and mood), and refer to measures obtained from self-report studies asking participants to quantify their current feelings or average feelings over a longer period of time. Even though some affect measures contain variations that allow assessment of basic predispositions to experience a certain emotion, tests for such stable traits are usually considered to be personality tests.

== Differentiating affect from other terms ==
Scholarly work has noted the problematic nature of using the terms "emotion", "affect" and "mood" interchangeably. A lack of thorough understanding of these concepts could influence the choice of measures used in assessing the emotional components of interest in a study, leading to a less optimal research result. The differentiation among these key concepts in affect research in the current era is becoming increasingly important, as consistent effort has been made to move out of the stage of using these constructs interchangeably.

=== Affect ===
Affect refers to the mental feeling from inside the body that underlies all emotional experience. It varies in valence (from unpleasant to pleasant) and arousal (from deactivated to activated). While affect is a general term, core affect is one of the fundamental components that constitute a basic emotional unit, what they termed as prototypical emotional episode, as proposed by Russell and Barrett in their seminal work. They suggest that besides core affect, other ingredients such as behavior facial emotional expression are also parts of one emotional unit.

=== Emotion ===
Emotion is a "complex set of interrelated subevents concerned with a specific object". In other words, emotion is a physical compound constituted by a number of more basic ingredients. This view comes from the psychological constructionist tradition, a more recent and theoretically rich approach. Earlier tradition in the study of human emotion can be broadly divided into two, namely appraisal and basic emotion approach. The appraisal tradition views emotion as a short-lived experience that involves cognitive appraisal as its defining feature, while the basic emotion approach believes that there are exclusive categories in emotional states.

=== Mood ===
Mood distinguishes from emotion in duration and intensity. Generally, mood is viewed as more persistent and less intense than emotional state, and as a result more stable. It falls between the fleeting emotional states and more enduring trait.

== Overview of affect measures ==
One categorization of affect measures is based on whether the measure focuses on transitory state or relatively stable trait dimension. The instructions of measures provide different timeframes to examine the continuum from state to trait. For example, the question framed as "In your daily life, how often do you feel...?" is measuring an enduring trait, while the question "How do you feel right now at this very moment?" is a measure for emotional states.

Another way to categorize the measures is to differentiate between distinct-states approach and dimensional approach. Examples of measures using distinct-states approach include theProfile of Mood States (POMS2), and the State-Trait Anxiety Inventory. Dimensional approach adopts the psychological constructionist tradition, but has been criticized for assuming the "emotions can be reduced to pleasant and unpleasant states or that affect alone provides a sufficient explanation for emotion". Examples of the dimensional approach measures include the Positive and Negative Affect Schedule (PANAS) and the Self-Assessment Manikin (SAM).

A three-step process is proposed for choosing an affective measure. Firstly, consider what the specific construct it is that you want to measure. Secondly, choosing the theoretical framework in accordance with the construct. Lastly, evaluate the psychometric feature of the measures available (e.g. reliability, validity, etc.).

== Measures of general affect ==
=== Affective Slider ===
The Affective Slider is an empirically validated digital scale for the self-assessment of affect composed of two slider controls that measure basic emotions in terms of pleasure and arousal, which constitute a bidimensional emotional space called core affect, that can be used to map more complex conscious emotional states.

=== PANAS ===
One frequently used measure for general affective states is the Positive and Negative Affect Schedule (PANAS). Participants completing the PANAS are asked to rate the extent to which they experienced each out of 20 emotions on a 5-point Likert Scale ranging from "very slightly" to "very much". The exact instructions may vary according to the purpose of the study: Participants may be asked how they feel right now or during longer periods of time (e.g. during the past year). Half of the presented emotion words concern negative affect (distressed, upset, guilty, ashamed, hostile, irritable, nervous, jittery, scared, afraid), the other half positive affect (interested, alert, attentive, excited, enthusiastic, inspired, proud, determined, strong, active). The PANAS has been regarded as a highly reliable measure for non-clinical populations. Independent validation studies indicate that the measure demonstrates excellent construct validity. Regardless of its wide use, PANAS has several limitations that researchers should be aware of in the selection process. As the original theory suggests, affect is a bipolar construct with a composite of valence and arousal. However, the categorization of positive emotion and negative emotion displays unipolarity that is contrary to its theoretical base. Another issue could be seen as the historical constraints. Originally developed as a measure for moods, the items in PANAS represent a mixture of different constructs like affect, emotion and mood. Some items do not fall into any of the categories, for example, distressed and nervous.

==== PANAS-X ====
The expanded version of PANAS is called PANAS-X and includes 60 instead of 20 emotion words (items). The instructions and the answer format are identical to the short PANAS. However, PANAS-X not only measures general positive and negative affect, but also four basic negative emotions (fear, hostility, guilt, and sadness), three basic positive emotions (joviality, self-assurance, and attentiveness), and four more complex affective states (shyness, fatigue, serenity, and surprise). The internal consistency (Cronbach's coefficient alpha) for all of these scales can be regarded sufficient (with all α≥.74), that is people report that they experience all emotions that make up one of the scales with similar strength. The manual of the PANAS-X offers further extensive psychometric information.

==== I-PANAS-SF ====
The International Positive and Negative Affect Schedule Short Form (I-PANAS-SF) is a shortened version of the PANAS, intended to only contain cross-culturally well understandable emotion words. In contrast to an earlier ad hoc created short forms of the PANAS, the I-PANAS-FX has been developed in a multi-study procedure including studies with participants from 16 countries. In the I-PANAS-SF, positive affect is measured using the words: active, alert, attentive, determined and inspired; negative affect is measured with the words: afraid, ashamed, hostile, nervous and upset. The I-PANAS-SF is intended for general use in research situations where either time or space is limited, and for international use with participants whose native language is not English.

=== STEM ===
The State-Trait Emotion Measure (STEM) is a more recently constructed measure that is explicitly framed to assess emotions at the workplace. The STEM assesses stable (trait) and current emotions (state) for five positive and five negative emotions: affection, anger, anxiety, attentiveness/energy, contentment, envy, guilt/shame, joy, pride, and sadness.

As opposed to the PANAS, people filling out the STEM are not only provided the emotion word, but also (1) a definition of that emotion, and (2) several example situation in which that emotion is usually felt from the work setting. Also, STEM assesses stable and current emotions at the same time, i.e. people are asked to mark the extent to which they felt each emotion "during your most recent day of work" and separately "How you generally feel when you are working". Another unique characteristic of the STEM is that it does not employ a standard Likert Scale that uses the same words to describe the points of the scale. Instead, several points of the scale are labeled with more precise emotion words related to the emotion in question, e.g. the scale for joy uses "amiable" as midpoint, "cheerful" to mark 8/10 and "happy" as positive extreme.

=== DES-IV ===
Differential Emotions Scale (DES) is developed on the basis of Differential Emotions Theory, which contends that emotions are closely related to the formation of personality. The scale advances to DES-IV with the theoretical development. DES-IV includes 36 items using a 5-point frequency Likert scale (from rarely or never to very often). These items can be divided into 12 categories that measure 12 fundamental emotions, which include interest, enjoyment, surprise, sadness, anger, disgust, contempt, fear, guilt, shame, shyness, and hostility inward. The inclusion of three sets of instructions allows the measure of long-term traits, persistent mood states and transient emotional states. It is viewed as a relatively reliable and flexible measure.

=== POMS2 ===
Profile of Mood States (POMS2) contains 65 items that assess seven mood state dimensions, labeled as nervousness (tension-anxiety), unhappiness (depression-dejection), fury (anger-hostility), energy (vigor-activity), exhaustion (fatigue-inertia), inability to concentrate (confusion-bewilderment) and friendliness. Compared to its first edition, POMS2 updated some of the core adjectives and added more normative sample. The popularity of POMS2 has enabled its use in various populations in clinical studies.

== Measures of negative affect ==
=== STAXI ===
The State-Trait Anger Expression Inventory (STAXI) has been developed as a 44-item questionnaire to assess stable (trait) and current (state) intensity of the expression of anger. Its current version is the STAXI-2 which has also been adapted for the use with children and adolescents.

The STAXI(-2) distinguishes between the three modes of anger expression: anger-out, anger-in and anger-control. Anger-out refers to a tendency to express anger through either verbal or physical behaviors. Anger-in or suppressed anger refers to the tendency to hold one's anger on the inside without any outlet. Anger-control refers to the tendency to engage in behaviors intended to reduce overt anger expression.

=== ARS ===
The Anger Rumination Scale (ARS) is a measure for the tendency to focus attention on angry moods, recall past anger experiences, and think about the causes and consequences of anger episodes. The questionnaire includes 19 items that assess four distinct aspects of anger: angry afterthoughts, thoughts of revenge, angry memories and understanding of causes. The items that contribute to each of these four scales have been shown to be answered in a highly similar way, i.e. they have high internal consistency.

=== STAS ===
The State-Trait Anger Scale (STAS) includes 10 items and initially constructed with two subscales: state anger (S-Anger), defined as an emotional state or condition that consists of subjective feelings of tension, annoyance, irritation, fury and rage; trait anger (T-Anger) defined in terms of individual differences in the frequency that S-Anger was experienced over time. The scores on both subscales were found to be unrelated to each other. While responses to all items of the S-Anger scale were found to be equally related to this same scale (high internal consistency), this was not true for the T-Anger scale. The T-Anger scale was therefore divided in two subscales: Angry Temperament – which describes the disposition to express anger – and Angry Reaction, which describes anger responses.

== See also ==
- Emotion classification
- Negative affectivity
- Positive affectivity
- Self-report inventory
