= Affect (psychology) =

Experience of feeling or emotion

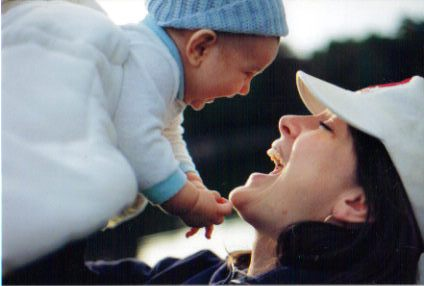
A mother and her child showing positive affect

Affect, in psychology, is the underlying experience of feeling, emotion, attachment, or mood. It encompasses a wide range of emotional states and can be positive (e.g., happiness, joy, excitement) or negative (e.g., sadness, anger, fear, disgust). Affect is a fundamental aspect of human experience and plays a central role in many psychological theories and studies. It can be understood as a combination of three components: emotion, mood (enduring, less intense emotional states that are not necessarily tied to a specific event), and affectivity (an individual's overall disposition or temperament, which can be characterized as having a generally positive or negative affect). In psychology, the term affect is often used interchangeably with several related terms and concepts, though each term may have slightly different nuances. These terms encompass: emotion, feeling, mood, emotional state, sentiment, affective state, emotional response, affective reactivity, and disposition. Researchers and psychologists may employ specific terms based on their focus and the context of their work.

== History ==
The modern conception of affect developed in the 19th century with Wilhelm Wundt. The word comes from the German Gefühl, meaning "feeling".

A number of experiments have been conducted in the study of social and psychological affective preferences (i.e., what people like or dislike). Specific research has been done on preferences, attitudes, impression formation, and decision-making. This research contrasts findings with recognition memory (old-new judgments), allowing researchers to demonstrate reliable distinctions between the two. Affect-based judgments and cognitive processes have been examined with noted differences indicated, and some argue affect and cognition are under the control of separate and partially independent systems that can influence each other in a variety of ways (Zajonc, 1980). Both affect and cognition may constitute independent sources of effects within systems of information processing. Others suggest emotion is a result of an anticipated, experienced, or imagined outcome of an adaptational transaction between organism and environment, therefore cognitive appraisal processes are keys to the development and expression of an emotion (Lazarus, 1982).

== Dimensions ==
Affective states vary along three principal dimensions: valence, arousal, and motivational intensity.

- Valence is the subjective spectrum of positive-to-negative evaluation of an experience an individual may have had. Emotional valence refers to the emotion's consequences, emotion-eliciting circumstances, or subjective feelings or attitudes.
- Arousal is objectively measurable as activation of the sympathetic nervous system, but can also be assessed subjectively via self-report.
- Motivational intensity refers to the impulsion to act; the strength of an urge to move toward or away from a stimulus and whether or not to interact with said stimulus. Simply moving is not considered approach (or avoidance) motivation

Arousal is different from motivational intensity. While arousal is a construct that is closely related to motivational intensity, they differ in that motivation necessarily implies action while arousal does not.

== Affect display ==
Affect is sometimes used to mean affect display, which is "a facial, vocal, or gestural behavior that serves as an indicator of affect" (APA 2006).

== Cognitive scope ==
In psychology, affect defines an organism's interaction with stimuli. It can influence the scope of the cognitive processes. Initially, researchers had thought that positive affects broadened the cognitive scope, whereas negative affects narrowed it. Thereafter, evidences suggested that affects high in motivational intensity narrow the cognitive scope, whereas affects low in motivational intensity broaden it. The construct of cognitive scope could be valuable in cognitive psychology.

== Affect tolerance ==
According to a research article about affect tolerance written by psychiatrist Jerome Sashin, "Affect tolerance can be defined as the ability to respond to a stimulus which would ordinarily be expected to evoke affects by the subjective experiencing of feelings." Essentially it refers to one's ability to react to emotions and feelings. One who is low in affect tolerance would show little to no reaction to emotion and feeling of any kind. This is closely related to alexithymia.

"Alexithymia is a subclinical phenomenon involving a lack of emotional awareness or, more specifically, difficulty in identifying and describing feelings and in distinguishing feelings from the bodily sensations of emotional arousal." At its core, alexithymia is an inability for an individual to recognize what emotions they are feeling—as well as an inability to describe them. According to Dalya Samur <> and colleagues, persons with alexithymia have been shown to have correlations with increased suicide rates, mental discomfort, and deaths.

Affect tolerance factors, including anxiety sensitivity, intolerance of uncertainty, and emotional distress tolerance, may be helped by mindfulness. Mindfulness is a mental state achieved by focusing one's awareness on the present moment, while calmly acknowledging and accepting one's feelings, thoughts, and bodily sensations without judgment. The practice of Intention, Attention, & Attitude.

Mindfulness has been shown to produce "increased subjective well-being, reduced psychological symptoms and emotional reactivity, and improved behavioral regulation."

== Relationship to behavior and cognition ==
The affective domain represents one of the three divisions described in modern psychology: the other two being the behavioral, and the cognitive. Classically, these divisions have also been referred to as the "ABC's of psychology", However, in certain views, the cognitive may be considered as a part of the affective, or the affective as a part of the cognitive; "cognitive and affective states … [are] merely analytic categories."

== Instinctive and cognitive factors in causation of affect ==
"Affect" can mean an instinctual reaction to stimulation that occurs before the typical cognitive processes considered necessary for the formation of a more complex emotion. Robert B. Zajonc asserts this reaction to stimuli is primary for human beings and that it is the dominant reaction for non-human organisms. Zajonc suggests that affective reactions can occur without extensive perceptual and cognitive encoding and be made sooner and with greater confidence than cognitive judgments (Zajonc, 1980).

Many theorists (e.g. Lazarus, 1982) consider affect to be post-cognitive: elicited only after a certain amount of cognitive processing of information has been accomplished. In this view, such affective reactions as liking, disliking, evaluation, or the experience of pleasure or displeasure each result from a different prior cognitive process that makes a variety of content discriminations and identifies features, examines them to find value, and weighs them according to their contributions (Brewin, 1989). Some scholars (e.g. Lerner and Keltner 2000) argue that affect can be both pre- and post-cognitive: initial emotional responses produce thoughts, which produce affect. In a further iteration, some scholars argue that affect is necessary for enabling more rational modes of cognition (e.g. Damasio 1994).

A divergence from a narrow reinforcement model of emotion allows other perspectives about how affect influences emotional development. Thus, temperament, cognitive development, socialization patterns, and the idiosyncrasies of one's family or subculture might interact in nonlinear ways. For example, the temperament of a highly reactive/low self-soothing infant may "disproportionately" affect the process of emotion regulation in the early months of life (Griffiths, 1997).

Some other social sciences, such as geography or anthropology, have adopted the concept of affect beginning in the late 2000s. In French psychoanalysis a major contribution to the field of affect comes from André Green. The focus on affect has largely derived from the work of Deleuze and brought emotional and visceral concerns into such conventional discourses as those on geopolitics, urban life and material culture. Affect has also challenged methodologies of the social sciences by emphasizing somatic power over the idea of a removed objectivity and therefore has strong ties with the contemporary non-representational theory.

== Cognitive effects of affect ==
There is a strong unconscious map between affect and vertical position, associating up with positive emotions and down with negative emotions. This is reflected in metaphors such as "sunny side up" and "feeling down", as well as the heaven-versus-hell dichotomy. Stimuli connected to emotions tend to bias visual attention toward upper and lower position. The origin of this bias is probably linked to early cognitive development; for example, Tolaas (1991) argues that it is because infants spend most of their waking time on their backs under a caregiver.

== Psychometric measurement ==
Affect has been found across cultures to comprise both positive and negative dimensions. The most commonly used measure in scholarly research is the Positive and Negative Affect Schedule (PANAS). The PANAS is a lexical measure developed in a North American setting and consisting of 20 single-word items, for instance excited, alert, determined for positive affect, and upset, guilty, and jittery for negative affect. However, some of the PANAS items have been found either to be redundant or to have ambiguous meanings to English speakers from non-North American cultures. As a result, an internationally reliable short-form, the I-PANAS-SF, has been developed and validated comprising two 5-item scales with internal reliability, cross-sample and cross-cultural factorial invariance, temporal stability, convergent and criterion-related validities.

Mroczek and Kolarz have also developed another set of scales to measure positive and negative affect. Each of the scales has 6 items. The scales have shown evidence of acceptable validity and reliability across cultures.

== Non-conscious affect and perception ==
In relation to perception, a type of non-conscious affect may be separate from the cognitive processing of environmental stimuli. A monohierarchy of perception, affect and cognition considers the roles of arousal, attention tendencies, affective primacy (Zajonc, 1980), evolutionary constraints (Shepard, 1984; 1994), and covert perception (Weiskrantz, 1997) within the sensing and processing of preferences and discriminations. Emotions are complex chains of events triggered by certain stimuli. There is no way to completely describe an emotion by knowing only some of its components. Verbal reports of feelings are often inaccurate because people may not know exactly what they feel, or they may feel several different emotions at the same time. There are also situations that arise in which individuals attempt to hide their feelings, and there are some who believe that public and private events seldom coincide exactly, and that words for feelings are generally more ambiguous than are words for objects or events. Therefore, non-conscious emotions need to be measured by measures circumventing self-report such as the Implicit Positive and Negative Affect Test (IPANAT; Quirin, Kazén, & Kuhl, 2009).

Affective responses, on the other hand, are more basic and may be less problematic in terms of assessment. Brewin has proposed two experiential processes that frame non-cognitive relations between various affective experiences: those that are prewired dispositions (i.e. non-conscious processes), able to "select from the total stimulus array those stimuli that are causally relevant, using such criteria as perceptual salience, spatiotemporal cues, and predictive value in relation to data stored in memory" (Brewin, 1989, p. 381), and those that are automatic (i.e. subconscious processes), characterized as "rapid, relatively inflexible and difficult to modify... (requiring) minimal attention to occur and... (capable of being) activated without intention or awareness" (1989 p. 381). But a note should be considered on the differences between affect and emotion.

== Arousal ==
Arousal is a basic physiological response to the presentation of stimuli. When this occurs, a non-conscious affective process takes the form of two control mechanisms: one mobilizing and the other immobilizing. Within the human brain, the amygdala regulates an instinctual reaction initiating this arousal process, either freezing the individual or accelerating mobilization.

The arousal response is illustrated in studies focused on reward systems that control food-seeking behavior (Balleine, 2005). Researchers have focused on learning processes and modulatory processes that are present while encoding and retrieving goal values. When an organism seeks food, the anticipation of reward based on environmental events becomes another influence on food seeking that is separate from the reward of food itself. Therefore, earning the reward and anticipating the reward are separate processes and both create an excitatory influence of reward-related cues. Both processes are dissociated at the level of the amygdala, and are functionally integrated within larger neural systems.

== Motivational intensity and cognitive scope ==
=== Measuring cognitive scope ===
Cognitive scope can be measured by tasks involving attention, perception, categorization and memory. Some studies use a flanker attention task to figure out whether cognitive scope is broadened or narrowed. For example, using the letters "H" and "N" participants need to identify as quickly as possible the middle letter of 5 when all the letters are the same (e.g. "HHHHH") and when the middle letter is different from the flanking letters (e.g. "HHNHH"). Broadened cognitive scope would be indicated if reaction times differed greatly from when all the letters were the same compared to when the middle letter is different. Other studies use a Navon attention task to measure difference in cognitive scope. A large letter is composed of smaller letters, in most cases smaller "L"'s or "F"'s that make up the shape of the letter "T" or "H" or vice versa. Broadened cognitive scope would be suggested by a faster reaction to name the larger letter, whereas narrowed cognitive scope would be suggested by a faster reaction to name the smaller letters within the larger letter. A source-monitoring paradigm can also be used to measure how much contextual information is perceived: for instance, participants are tasked to watch a screen which serially displays words to be memorized for 3 seconds each, and also have to remember whether the word appeared on the left or the right half of the screen. The words were also encased in a colored box, but the participants did not know that they would eventually be asked what color box the word appeared in.

=== Main research findings ===
Motivation intensity refers to the strength of urge to move toward or away from a particular stimulus.

Anger and fear affective states, induced via film clips, resulted in more selective attention on a flanker task compared to controls as indicated by reaction times that were not very different, even when the flanking letters were different from the middle target letter. Both anger and fear have high motivational intensity because propulsion to act would be high in the face of an angry or fearful stimulus, like a screaming person or coiled snake. Affects which are high in motivational intensity, and thus are narrow in cognitive scope, enable people to focus more on target information. After seeing a sad picture, participants were faster to identify the larger letter in a Navon attention task, suggesting more global or broadened cognitive scope. Sadness is thought to sometimes have low motivational intensity. But, after seeing a disgusting picture, participants were faster to identify the component letters, indicative of a localized and narrower cognitive scope. Disgust has high motivational intensity. Affects which are high in motivational intensity narrow one's cognitive scope, enabling people to focus more on central information, whereas affects which are low in motivational intensity broadened cognitive scope, allowing for faster global interpretation. The changes in cognitive scope associated with different affective states is evolutionarily adaptive because high motivational intensity affects elicited by stimuli that require movement and action should be focused on, in a phenomenon known as goal-directed behavior. For example, in early times, seeing a lion (a fearful stimulus) probably elicited a negative but highly motivational affective state (fear) in which the human being was propelled to run away. In this case the goal would be to avoid getting killed.

Moving beyond just negative affective states, researchers wanted to test whether or not negative or positive affective states varied between high and low motivational intensity. To evaluate this theory, Harmon-Jones, Gable and Price created an experiment using appetitive picture priming and the Navon task, which would allow them to measure the attentional scope with detection of the Navon letters. The Navon task included a neutral affect comparison condition. Typically, neutral states cause broadened attention with a neutral stimulus. They predicted that a broad attentional scope could cause faster detection of global (large) letters, whereas a narrow attentional scope could cause faster detection of local (small) letters. The evidence proved that the appetitive stimuli produced a narrowed attentional scope. The experimenters further increased the narrowed attentional scope in appetitive stimuli by telling participants they would be allowed to consume the desserts shown in the pictures. The results revealed that their hypothesis was correct, in that the broad attentional scope led to quicker detection of global letters, while narrowed attentional scope led to quicker detection of local letters.

Researchers Bradley, Codispoti, Cuthbert and Lang wanted to further examine the emotional reactions in picture priming. Instead of using an appetitive stimulus they used stimulus sets from the International Affective Picture System (IAPS). The image set includes various unpleasant pictures such as snakes, insects, attack scenes, accidents, illness, and loss. They predicted that an unpleasant picture would stimulate a defensive motivational intensity response, which would produce strong emotional arousal such as skin gland responses and cardiac deceleration. Participants rated the pictures based on valence, arousal and dominance on the Self-Assessment Manikin (SAM) rating scale. The findings were consistent with the hypothesis and proved that emotion is organized motivationally by the intensity of activation in appetitive or defensive systems.

Prior to research in 2013, Harmon-Jones and Gable performed an experiment to examine whether neural activation related to approach-motivation intensity (left frontal-central activity) would trigger the effect of appetitive stimuli on narrowed attention. They also tested whether individual dissimilarities in approach motivation are associated with attentional narrowing. In order to test the hypothesis, the researchers used the same Navon task with appetitive and neutral pictures in addition to having the participants indicate how long since they had last eaten in minutes. To examine neural activation, the researchers used electroencephalography and recorded eye movements in order to detect what regions of the brain were being used during approach motivation. The results supported the hypothesis that the left frontal-central brain region is related to approach-motivational processes and narrowed attentional scope. Some psychologists were concerned that the individuals who were hungry had an increase in activity in the left frontal-central region due to frustration. This statement was proved false because the research showed that dessert pictures increased positive affect even in hungry individuals. The findings revealed that narrowed cognitive scope has the ability to assist us in goal accomplishment.

=== Clinical applications ===
Later on, researchers connected motivational intensity to clinical applications and found that alcohol-related pictures caused narrowed attention for persons who had a strong motivation to consume alcohol. The researchers tested the participants by exposing them to alcohol and neutral pictures. After the picture was displayed on a screen, the participants finished a test evaluating attentional focus. The findings proved that exposure to alcohol-related pictures led to a narrowing of attentional focus to individuals who were motivated to use alcohol. However, exposure to neutral pictures did not correlate with alcohol-related motivation to manipulate attentional focus. The Alcohol Myopia Theory (AMT) states that alcohol consumption reduces the amount of information available in memory, which also narrows attention so only the most proximal items or striking sources are encompassed in attentional scope. This narrowed attention leads intoxicated persons to make more extreme decisions than they would when sober. Researchers provided evidence that substance-related stimuli capture the attention of individuals when they have high and intense motivation to consume the substance. Motivational intensity and cue-induced narrowing of attention has a unique role in shaping people's initial decision to consume alcohol. In 2013, psychologists from the University of Missouri investigated the connection between sport achievement orientation and alcohol outcomes. They asked varsity athletes to complete a Sport Orientation Questionnaire which measured their sport-related achievement orientation on three scales—competitiveness, win orientation, and goal orientation. The participants also completed assessments of alcohol use and alcohol-related problems. The results revealed that the goal orientation of the athletes were significantly associated with alcohol use but not alcohol-related problems.

In terms of psychopathological implications and applications, college students showing depressive symptoms were better at retrieving seemingly "nonrelevant" contextual information from a source monitoring paradigm task. Namely, the students with depressive symptoms were better at identifying the color of the box the word was in compared to nondepressed students. Sadness (low motivational intensity) is usually associated with depression, so the more broad focus on contextual information of sadder students supports that affects high in motivational intensity narrow cognitive scope whereas affects low in motivational intensity broaden cognitive scope.

The motivational intensity theory states that the difficulty of a task combined with the importance of success determine the energy invested by an individual. The theory has three main layers. The innermost layer says human behavior is guided by the desire to conserve as much energy as possible. Individuals aim to avoid wasting energy so they invest only the energy that is required to complete the task. The middle layer focuses on the difficulty of tasks combined with the importance of success and how this affects energy conservation. It focuses on energy investment in situations of clear and unclear task difficulty. The last layer looks at predictions for energy invested by a person when they have several possible options to choose at different task difficulties. The person is free to choose among several possible options of task difficulty. The motivational intensity theory offers a logical and consistent framework for research. Researchers can predict a person's actions by assuming effort refers to the energy investment. The motivational intensity theory is used to show how changes in goal attractiveness and energy investment correlate.

== Mood ==
Mood, like emotion, is an affective state. However, an emotion tends to have a clear focus (i.e., its cause is self-evident), while mood tends to be more unfocused and diffuse. Mood, according to Batson, Shaw and Oleson (1992), involves tone and intensity and a structured set of beliefs about general expectations of a future experience of pleasure or pain, or of positive or negative affect in the future. Unlike instant reactions that produce affect or emotion, and that change with expectations of future pleasure or pain, moods, being diffuse and unfocused and thus harder to cope with, can last for days, weeks, months or even years (Schucman, 1975). Moods are hypothetical constructs depicting an individual's emotional state. Researchers typically infer the existence of moods from a variety of behavioral referents (Blechman, 1990). Habitual negative affect and negative mood is characteristic of high neuroticism.

Positive affect and negative affect (PANAS) represent independent domains of emotion in the general population, and positive affect is strongly linked to social interaction. Positive and negative daily events show independent relationships to subjective well-being, and positive affect is strongly linked to social activity. Recent research suggests that high functional support is related to higher levels of positive affect. In his work on negative affect arousal and white noise, Seidner found support for the existence of a negative affect arousal mechanism regarding the devaluation of speakers from other ethnic origins. The exact process through which social support is linked to positive affect remains unclear. The process could derive from predictable, regularized social interaction, from leisure activities where the focus is on relaxation and positive mood, or from the enjoyment of shared activities. The techniques used to shift a negative mood to a positive one are called mood repair strategies.

== Social interaction ==
Affect display is a critical facet of interpersonal communication. Evolutionary psychologists have advanced the hypothesis that hominids have evolved with sophisticated capability of reading affect displays.

Emotions are portrayed as dynamic processes that mediate the individual's relation to a continually changing social environment. In other words, emotions are considered to be processes of establishing, maintaining, or disrupting the relation between the organism and the environment on matters of significance to the person.

Most social and psychological phenomena occur as the result of repeated interactions between multiple individuals over time. These interactions should be seen as a multi-agent system—a system that contains multiple agents interacting with each other and/or with their environments over time. The outcomes of individual agents' behaviors are interdependent: Each agent's ability to achieve its goals depends on not only what it does but also what other agents do.

Emotions are one of the main sources for the interaction. Emotions of an individual influence the emotions, thoughts and behaviors of others; others' reactions can then influence their future interactions with the individual expressing the original emotion, as well as that individual's future emotions and behaviors. Emotion operates in cycles that can involve multiple people in a process of reciprocal influence.

Affect, emotion, or feeling is displayed to others through facial expressions, hand gestures, posture, voice characteristics, and other physical manifestation. These affect displays vary between and within cultures and are displayed in various forms ranging from the most discrete of facial expressions to the most dramatic and prolific gestures.

Observers are sensitive to agents' emotions, and are capable of recognizing the messages these emotions convey. They react to and draw inferences from an agent's emotions. The emotion an agent displays may not be an authentic reflection of their actual state (See also Emotional labor).

Agents' emotions can have effects on four broad sets of factors:

1. Emotions of other persons
2. Inferences of other persons
3. Behaviors of other persons
4. Interactions and relationships between the agent and other persons.

Emotion may affect not only the person at whom it was directed, but also third parties who observe an agent's emotion. Moreover, emotions can affect larger social entities such as a group or a team. Emotions are a kind of message and therefore can influence the emotions, attributions and ensuing behaviors of others, potentially evoking a feedback process to the original agent.

Agents' feelings evoke feelings in others by two suggested distinct mechanisms:

- Emotion contagion – people tend to automatically and unconsciously mimic non-verbal expressions. Mimicking occurs also in interactions involving textual exchanges alone.
- Emotion interpretation – an individual may perceive an agent as feeling a particular emotion and react with complementary or situationally appropriate emotions of their own. The feelings of the others diverge from and in some way complement the feelings of the original agent.

People may not only react emotionally, but may also draw inferences about emotive agents such as the social status or power of an emotive agent, their competence and their credibility. For example, an agent presumed to be angry may also be presumed to have high power.

== See also ==
- Affect consciousness
- Affect control theory
- Affect heuristic
- Affect infusion model
- Affect labeling
- Affect measures
- Affect theory
- Affective computing
- Affective neuroscience
- Affective science
- Affective spectrum
- Feeling
- Negative affectivity
- Reduced affect display
- Reversal theory
- Social neuroscience
- Subjective well-being
- Vedanā

== Bibliography ==
- APA (2006). VandenBos, Gary R., ed. APA Dictionary of Psychology Washington, DC: American Psychological Association, page 26.
- Balliene, B. W. (2005). "Dietary Influences on Obesity: Environment, Behavior and Biology". Physiology & Behavior. 86 (5): 717–730.
- Batson, C.D., Shaw, L. L., Oleson, K. C. (1992). Differentiating Affect, Mood and Emotion: Toward Functionally based Conceptual Distinctions. Emotion. Newbury Park, CA: Sage
- Blechman, E. A. (1990). Moods, Affect, and Emotions. Lawrence Erlbaum Associates: Hillsdale, NJ
- Brewin, C. R. (1989). "Cognitive Change Processes in Psychotherapy". Psychological Review. 96 (45): 379–394. doi:10.1037/0033-295x.96.3.379. PMID 2667012.
- Damasio, A., (1994). *Descartes' Error: Emotion, Reason, and the Human Brain, Putnam Publishing
- Griffiths, P. E. (1997). What Emotions Really Are: The Problem of Psychological Categories. The University of Chicago Press: Chicago
- Hommel, Bernhard (2019). "Affect and control: A conceptual clarification". International Journal of Psychophysiology. 144 (10): 1–6.
- Lazarus, R. S. (1982). "Thoughts on the Relations between Emotions and Cognition". American Physiologist. 37 (10): 1019–1024.
- Lerner, J.S.; Keltner, D. (2000). "Beyond valence: Toward a model of emotion-specific influences on judgement and choice". Cognition and Emotion. 14 (4): 473–493. doi:10.1080/026999300402763. S2CID 397458.
- Nathanson, Donald L. Shame and Pride: Affect, Sex, and the Birth of the Self. London: W.W. Norton, 1992
- Quirin, M.; Kazén, M.; Kuhl, J. (2009). "When nonsense sounds happy or helpless: The Implicit Positive and Negative Affect Test (IPANAT)". Journal of Personality and Social Psychology. 97 (3): 500–516. doi:10.1037/a0016063. PMID 19686004.
- Schucman, H., Thetford, C. (1975). A Course in Miracle. New York: Viking Penguin
- Shepard, R. N. (1984). "Ecological Constraints on Internal Representation". Psychological Review. 91 (4): 417–447. doi:10.1037/0033-295x.91.4.417.
- Shepard, R. N. (1994). "Perceptual-cognitive Universals as Reflections of the World". Psychonomic Bulletin & Review. 1 (1): 2–28. doi:10.3758/bf03200759. PMID 24203412.
- Weiskrantz, L. (1997). Consciousness Lost and Found. Oxford: Oxford Univ. Press.
- Zajonc, R. B. (1980). "Feelings and Thinking: Preferences Need No Inferences". American Psychologist. 35 (2): 151–175. doi:10.1037/0003-066x.35.2.151.
