= Emotional responsivity =

Ability to acknowledge stimuli by exhibiting emotion

Emotional responsivity refers to the degree, immediacy, and appropriateness of an individual's emotional reactions to internal or external stimuli. It encompasses both intensity (how strong the emotion is) and latency (how quickly it arises), as well as regulation (how well it's modulated or sustained). In psychological and neuroscientific contexts, emotional responsivity is often used to evaluate affective processing, particularly in disorders such as, PTSD, borderline personality disorders, schizophrenia and autism.

Two key axes:

Hyporesponsivity – Diminished or blunted emotional response, often observed in conditions like schizophrenia or psychopathy.

Hyperresponsivity – Heightened, exaggerated emotional reactivity, common in mood disorders or emotionally unstable personality types.

Emotional responsivity is connected to broader psychology concepts about emotions. People exhibit emotions in response to outside stimuli. Positive affective stimuli trigger feelings of pleasure such as happiness; negative affective stimuli trigger feelings of displeasure such as disgust and fear. Emotional responses include but are not limited to facial expressions and neurophysiological activities. For example, people display a "smile" when exposed to positive stimuli and a "frown" when exposed to negative stimuli. The feeling associated with emotion is called an affect, which can be categorized by valence and arousal. Valence describes the degree to which the feeling is a pleasure or displeasure. Arousal describes the degree to which a person is awoken by outside stimuli.

== Experimental measures ==
Clinical studies of emotional responsivity involve two essential procedures. First, the researchers try to stimulate emotions from the participants by engaging participants in specific tasks. Then, the researchers measure the degree to which the participants respond to the stimuli.

Tasks used to stimulate emotional responses include:

- Picture stimuli: this task involves showing participants pleasant or unpleasant pictures and ask participants to rate the arousal and valence level of the picture. A pleasant picture could depict opposite-sex erotica; an unpleasant picture could be a burned human body. The International Affective Picture System is a photo database that generates pictures designed to arouse specific emotions.
- Film clips: this task asks participants to view film clips that arouse different emotions. For example, comedies' clips trigger potential feelings of joy. Neutral clips such as scenes of rainforests usually are included to serve as a control.
- Experimenter distress: this task involves the experimenter to stimulate emotions from participants by acting scenarios of distress. For example, the experimenter bans his or her knee and display expressions of pain.
- Facial stimuli: this task involves asking a participant to view pictures of human faces that display different facial expressions. Participants would then be asked to rate their emotional experience. The facial expression would be considered as the affective stimuli.
- Yummy-yucky: in this task, a child is asked to eat a certain food that was chosen by his or her parent. An experimenter then tastes the chosen food and displays either pleased or disgusted facial expression.
- Surprise box: this task intends to stimulate an emotional response by opening a box in front of a participant, usually a child, and displaying either an "amazed" reaction by saying "ohh" or a "frightened" reaction by saying "ahh".

After exposing participants to affective stimuli, researchers typically use the following methods to measure, record, and sometimes code emotional responsivity:

- Skin conductance (electrodermal activity): Skin conductivity indicates emotional arousal because increased sweat production by certain emotions increases the skin conductivity level.
- fMRI: this technology generates neuro-images of brain activities. fMRI can detect neurophysiological changes in the brain and thereby help determine the degree to which a person is aroused by the stimulus. For example, increased amygdala activity can be an indication of fear.
- Facial Action Coding System (FACS): this method uses the taxonomy of the face to measure movements of facial muscles. For example, the contraction of the orbicularis oculi muscle is an indication of happiness.
- Maximally Discriminative Facial Movement Coding System: this system is mostly used to measure the emotional responsivity of young children by corresponding universally recognized facial expressions to emotions. For example, lowering eyebrows indicates emotions of anger.
- Self-report: this method asks the participants to rate their valence and arousal level through questionnaires such as the Emotionally Expressivity Scales and the Berkley Expressivity Questionnaire. Studies have shown that self-report might not correspond to objective measures such as fMRI.
- Ambulatory Blood Pressure Monitoring (ABPM): Tool used to measure blood pressure. Increases in blood pressure show remarkable levels of emotional responsivity.

== Emotional responsivity in mental illness ==
=== Autism ===
Autism is associated with decreased emotional responsivity. There was a study involving twenty-six children with autism and fifteen children with other learning disabilities, in which an adult displayed some form of emotion to study how the children respond. They focused on attention, hedonic tone, latency to changes in tone and an emotional contagion summery was made. Studies show correlations between measures of joint attention, emotional contagion, and the severity of autism. Results demonstrate that children with autism did not demonstrate changes in affect; however, their responses occurred much less than in comparison groups.

In another study involving twenty-one autism patients, FACS analysis demonstrates that people with autism display less facial responsivity when watching evocative films. Specifically, when compared to the control group, the autism group does not demonstrate the more complex muscular movements and displayed less differentiated facial responses when exposed to stimuli. This study confirms that autism impedes social interaction and cognition.

=== Schizophrenia ===
Schizophrenia impacts emotional responsivity by reducing a person's hedonic capacity and producing a blunted affect. Patients usually have an increased emotional response to displeasure and a decreased emotional response to pleasure. A study involving 22 outpatients demonstrates that schizophrenia increases the emotional responsivity to low arousing negative stimuli while decreases the emotional responsivity to high arousing positive stimuli. People with Schizophrenia exhibit fewer facial expressions when watching evocative films.

There are differences in the arousal level of stimuli between paranoid and non-paranoid schizophrenia. Non-paranoid patients have increased negative emotional responsitivity and decreased positive emotional disregarding arousal levels. In comparison, paranoid schizophrenia has increased emotional responsivity to low arousing stimuli and reduced responsivity to high arousing stimuli. This study supports that Schizophrenia disturbs emotional experience.

=== Traumatic brain injury (TBI) ===
Traumatic brain injury is associated with reduced responsivity to negative affective stimuli. A study involving twenty-one TBI individuals uses picture stimuli to demonstrate that people TBI have normal emotional responsivity to pleasant pictures but show limited responses to unpleasant pictures. A potential explanation is that TBI damages the ventral surfaces of the frontal and temporal lobes, which are areas associated with emotional processing.

=== Math anxiety ===
Math anxiety describes the situation in which a person is overly distressed by math stimuli. A study involving fMRI techniques and 40 students demonstrates that people with math anxiety have increased emotional responsivity to math stimuli. The study suggests that when exposed to math-related stimuli, amygdala activity increases in participants' brain, which lowers the threshold of responding to a potential threat. Moreover, participants with math anxiety disengage and avoid the math stimuli more than images with negative valence such as a bleeding arm. The study suggests that math anxiety resembles other types of phobia in that there is increased vigilance and responsivity to specific stimuli.

=== Post-Traumatic Stress Disorder (PTSD) ===
Post-traumatic stress disorder impacts emotional responsivity. A study showed that people with high PTSD severity abuse much more substances than others and have difficulties controlling their emotions. Not being able to regulate their emotions were found to have symptoms of PTSD and problems of alcohol and drug use.

== Emotional responsivity in substance-use ==
=== Cocaine-exposed infants ===
Using cocaine during pregnancy creates neurological damage to the fetus and neurobehavioral problems to the infants. 72 infants participated in a study where 36 infants have prenatal exposure to cocaine. The results demonstrate that compared to the control group, cocaine-exposed infants have decreased emotional responsivity, as they exhibit fewer expressions of joy, interest, surprise, anger, and sadness. Specifically, the cocaine-exposed group has reduced response to positive affective stimuli, suggesting that cocaine-exposure during pregnancy decreases feelings of joyfulness.

=== Alcoholism ===
Alcohol consumption impairs affective processing and therefore leads to abnormal responses to environmental stimuli. A study involving 42 abstinent alcoholics and 46 nonalcoholic demonstrates that alcoholics usually have lower emotional responsivity to erotic, happy, aversive, and gruesome stimuli. However, an in-depth analysis of fMRI images reveals gender differences. Alcoholic men have reduced emotional responsivity while alcoholic women have increased emotional responsivity to positive affective stimuli. The study suggests that the gender difference is associated with different functional abnormalities of emotional processing in the cortical, subcortical, and cerebellar regions of the brain.

=== Opioids ===
Opioids has shown to help decrease negative emotional responsivity. A study involving 21 people using opioids and 21 people not using opioids found that those using the drug had decreased levels of depression and elation compared to the other group. Those using the drug tend to show less emotion.

== Emotional responsivity in social factors ==
=== Social interaction ===
Emotional responsivity is said to have a unique association with social interaction. Studies suggest that social interaction, especially at home, can influence the way a child responds to emotional stimuli. For example, if child grew up in a home where emotional displays resulted in punishment or negative criticism, the child would have the tendency to find ways to hide their emotions.

=== Sleep Deprivation ===
Sleeping issues in children have been linked to many physical and mental health problems later on in adulthood and created a greater risk for emotional and behavioral issues in children. Studies haven't been able to link the physiological functions with sleeping disturbances to these psychological consequences. Emotional lability, responsivity, psychological responses to positive and negative picture stimuli have all been a result of sleep deprivation.

Doctors today are using neuroimaging to connect the relationship between sleep and neural mechanisms that cause emotional responsively in children. These studies resulted, "In general, the largest and most extensive sleep-related correlations for any emotion were found for disgust expressions".

== Treatment ==
=== Emotion Regulation Therapy (ERT) ===
A developed treatment that combines principles from traditional and contemporary cognitive therapy. ERT looks to understand and help individuals with mental illnesses. Experiments have shown support for the use of ERT as it has shown better results than already established treatments.
