= Bruna De Palo =

Italian author, executive coach and speaker

Bruna De Palo is an Italian author, executive coach and speaker based in London, United Kingdom. She is known for her work on neuroscience-informed leadership and organisational behaviour. She is the author of The Brain Instruction Manual for Leaders: What Nobody Told You About Working with Humans (2026), published by John Murray Business, an imprint of Hachette UK.

== Career ==
De Palo began her professional career in the technology sector, where she worked for approximately two decades before moving into executive coaching. She subsequently developed a practice focused on applying insights from neuroscience to leadership, decision-making and workplace relationships.

Her work examines how an understanding of human behaviour can inform leadership practices, particularly in relation to stress, communication, organisational change and team dynamics.

== Writing ==
In June 2026, De Palo published The Brain Instruction Manual for Leaders: What Nobody Told You About Working with Humans through John Murray Business.

The book explores how neuroscience can be applied to common leadership challenges, including psychological safety, emotional responses, workplace conflict and resistance to change. It combines explanations of brain function with practical examples from organisational settings.

The publication received coverage in international business media. In July 2026, Dutch business publication MT/Sprout published an examination of the book's approach to leadership and stress. In August 2026, Forbes contributor Roger Trapp discussed its arguments concerning psychological safety, organisational performance and change.

== Recognition ==
De Palo was included in the 2026 Thinkers50 Coaches50 list, recognising her work in neuroscience-based executive and team coaching.

== Bibliography ==
- De Palo, Bruna (2026). The Brain Instruction Manual for Leaders: What Nobody Told You About Working with Humans. London: John Murray Business. ISBN 9781399837453.
