= Niedenthal =

Niedenthal is a surname. Notable people with the surname include:

- Clemens Niedenthal
- Chris Niedenthal (born 1950), British/Polish photographer and photojournalist
- Paula M. Niedenthal, American social psychologist
