= Cognitive restructuring =

Type of psychological therapy

Cognitive restructuring (CR) is a psychotherapeutic process of learning to identify and dispute irrational or maladaptive thoughts known as cognitive distortions, such as all-or-nothing thinking (splitting), magical thinking, overgeneralization, magnification, and emotional reasoning, which are commonly associated with many mental health disorders. CR employs many strategies, such as Socratic questioning, thought recording, and guided imagery, and is used in many types of therapies, including cognitive behavioral therapy (CBT) and rational emotive behaviour therapy (REBT). A number of studies demonstrate considerable efficacy in using CR-based therapies.

== Overview ==
Cognitive restructuring involves four steps:

1. Identification of problematic cognitions known as "automatic thoughts" (ATs) which are dysfunctional or negative views of the self, world, or future based upon already existing beliefs about oneself, the world, or the future
2. Identification of the cognitive distortions in the ATs
3. Rational disputation of ATs with the Socratic method
4. Development of a rational rebuttal to the ATs

There are six types of automatic thoughts:

1. Self-evaluated thoughts
2. Thoughts about the evaluations of others
3. Evaluative thoughts about the other person with whom they are interacting
4. Thoughts about coping strategies and behavioral plans
5. Thoughts of avoidance
6. Any other thoughts that were not categorized

== Clinical applications ==
Cognitive restructuring has been used to help individuals experiencing a variety of psychiatric conditions, including depression, substance abuse disorders, anxiety disorders collectively, post-traumatic stress disorder, bulimia, social phobia, borderline personality disorder, attention deficit hyperactivity disorder (ADHD), and problem gambling.

When utilizing cognitive restructuring in rational emotive therapy (RET), the emphasis is on two central notions: (1) thoughts affect human emotion as well as behavior and (2) irrational beliefs are mainly responsible for a wide range of disorders. RET also classifies four types of irrational beliefs: dire necessity, feeling awful, cannot stand something, and self-condemnation. It is described as cognitive-emotional retraining. The rationale used in cognitive restructuring attempts to strengthen the client's belief that (1) "self-talk" can influence performance, and (2) in particular self-defeating thoughts or negative self-statements can cause emotional distress and interfere with performance, a process that then repeats again in a cycle. Mood repair strategies are implemented in cognitive restructuring in hopes of contributing to a cessation of the negative cycle.

When utilizing cognitive restructuring in cognitive behavioral therapy (CBT), it is combined with psychoeducation, monitoring, in vivo experience, imaginal exposure, behavioral activation, and homework assignments to achieve remission. The cognitive behavioral approach is said to consist of three core techniques: cognitive restructuring, training in coping skills, and problem solving.

== Applications within therapy ==
There are many methods used in cognitive restructuring, which usually involve identifying and labelling distorted thoughts, such as "all or none thinking, disqualifying the positive, mental filtering, jumping to conclusions, catastrophizing, emotional reasoning, should statements, and personalization." The following lists methods commonly used in cognitive restructuring:

- Socratic questioning
- Thought recording
- Identifying cognitive errors
- Examining the evidence (pro-con analysis or cost-benefits analysis)
- Understanding idiosyncratic meaning/semantic techniques
- Labeling distortions
- Decatastrophizing
- Reattribution
- Cognitive rehearsal
- Guided imagery
- Listing rational alternatives
- Rational emotive behavior therapy (REBT) includes awfulizing, when a person causes themselves disturbance by labelling an upcoming situation as 'awful', rather than envisaging how the situation may actually unfold, and Must-ing, when a person places a false demand on themselves that something 'must' happen (e.g. 'I must get an A in this exam'.)

== Criticism ==
Critics of cognitive restructuring claim that the process of challenging dysfunctional thoughts will "teach clients to become better suppressors and avoiders of their unwanted thoughts" and that cognitive restructuring shows less immediate improvement because real-world practice is often required. Other criticisms include that the approach is mechanistic and impersonal and that the relationship between therapist and client is irrelevant. Neil Jacobson's component analysis of cognitive behavioural therapy (CBT), claims that the cognitive restructuring component is unnecessary, at least with depression. He argues that it is the behavioural activation components of CBT that are effective in giving therapy, not cognitive restructuring, as delivered by cognitive behavioural therapy. Others also argue that it's not necessary to challenge thoughts with cognitive restructuring.

== See also ==
- Cognitive appraisal
- Cognitive reframing
- Cognitive science
- Cognitive psychology
