= Raimonds =

Male given name

- Gender: Male
- Name day: 29 April

Origin
- Region of origin: Latvia

Raimonds is a Latvian masculine given name and may refer to:

- Raimonds Bergmanis (born 1966), Latvian weightlifting champion, strongman and Olympic competitor
- Raimonds Feldmanis (born 1982), Latvian basketballer and coach
- Raimonds Jermaks, Latvian psychedelic visual effects artist
- Raimonds Karnītis (1929–1999), Latvian basketball player and coach
- Raimonds Laizāns (born 1964), Latvian football goalkeeper
- Raimonds Miglinieks (born 1970), Latvian professional basketball player
- Raimonds Pauls (born 1936), Latvian composer and pianist
- Raimonds Staprans (1926–2026), Latvian playwright
- Raimonds Vaikulis (born 1980), Latvian professional basketball guard
- Raimonds Vējonis (born 1966), Latvian politician
- Raimonds Vilde (born 1962), Latvian volleyball player and Olympic competitor
- Raimonds Vilkoits (born 1990), Latvian professional ice hockey player
