= Qualia Research Institute =

American non-profit organization

- Location: Silicon Valley, California, United States
- President: Andrés Gómez Emilsson
- Website: www.qri.org

Qualia Research Institute (QRI) is a nonprofit research organization based in Silicon Valley, California that focuses on researching consciousness and psychedelics. The organization is led by Andrés Gómez Emilsson, and it describes itself as "revealing the computational properties of consciousness". Its board of directors includes Olaf Carlson-Wee, founder of Polychain Capital, and its board of advisors includes Wojciech Zaremba, co-founder of OpenAI.

== Research ==
Qualia Research Institute aims to develop a mathematical formalization of consciousness. This is motivated by the premises of qualia formalism, which asserts that subjective human experiences correspond to mathematical structures, as well as valence realism, which asserts that conscious experience can be measured objectively. These premises form the foundation of the Symmetry Theory of Valence, proposed by Michael Johnson in collaboration with researchers at QRI. The Symmetry Theory of Valence states that valence (or the subjective feeling associated with a particular state of consciousness) is dependent on the symmetry of the mathematical object that describes it.

Two contrasting views in the phenomenology of valence are that of a constrained valence psychology, where the most intense experiences are generally no more than 10 times more intense than the mildest, and the heavy-tailed valence hypothesis, which states that the range of possible degrees of valence is far more extreme. QRI has published research in support of the heavy-tailed valence hypothesis.

QRI's work also includes the creation of web tools that replicate the effects of "tracers" that are seen while under the influence of psychedelics, as well as guides for writing reports on conscious experiences induced by psychedelics. QRI aims to explore the largely understudied psychedelic compound DMT.

QRI has also done research on the binding problem, as well as the related boundary problem, and has proposed a unique solution based on topological segmentation of the electromagnetic field. The boundary problem is essentially the inverse of the binding problem, and asks how binding stops occurring and what prevents other neurological phenomena from being included in first-person perspectives, giving first-person perspectives hard boundaries.

== Psychedelic Cryptography contest ==
In March 2023, Qualia Research Institute launched a "Psychedelic Cryptography" contest, challenging participants to create videos encoded with information designed to be easily deciphered by individuals under the psychoactive effects of psychedelics such as LSD and psilocybin mushrooms but not sober individuals. The contest sought to explore how altered states of consciousness may enhance aspects of information processing. It concluded in June 2023, and three winners were awarded with cash prizes. One of the winners was psychedelic replicator Symmetric Vision (Raimond Jermaks).
