= Affect consciousness =

Psychological concept

Affect consciousness (or affect integration - a more generic term for the same phenomenon) refers to an individual's ability to consciously perceive, tolerate, reflect upon, and express affects. These four abilities are operationalized as degrees of awareness, tolerance, emotional (nonverbal) expression, and conceptual (verbal) expression of each of the following eleven affect categories:

- Interest/Excitement
- Enjoyment/Joy
- Fear/Panic
- Anger/Rage
- Shame/Humiliation
- Contempt/Condescension
- Disgust/Revulsion
- Sadness/Despair
- Envy/Jealousy
- Guilt/Remorse
- Tenderness/Care

The Affect Consciousness Interview (ACI) (Monsen et al., 2008), a semi-structured interview, is used to evaluate an individual's affect consciousness. The ACI evaluates the individual's awareness, tolerance, emotional expression, and conceptual expression of each of the affect categories are evaluated using a nine-point Affect Consciousness Scale (ACS), with the most current version containing eleven affect categories. The AC-construct and its psychotherapeutic implications were first proposed and described by Norwegian Psychology Professor Jon Monsen and his associates in the early 1980s. The construct has become increasingly popular and more widely researched in recent years.

== Conceptual background ==
A number of authors and theoretical traditions inspired the development of the AC-construct, most notably Silvan Tomkins' Basic Affect Theory, Script Theoretical formulations and differential emotions theory (Izard, 1977, 1991). Modern self psychological formulations, specifically those advocated by Stolorow, Brandchaft, & Atwood (1995), Stolorow & Atwood (1992), and Basch (1983) are also central, along with the writings of Stern (1985), and the seminal studies by Emde and his associates (e.g., Sorce, Emde, Campos & Klinnert, 1985) on nonverbal affective communication with infants. Based on Tomkins' affect and script theory (2008b,1995a), the affect consciousness model posits that affect, along with pain, homeostatic life, support processes, and the cyclical drives, constitute the primary motivating forces in all human affairs. Of these motivational forces the affects are seen as the primary, and by far the most flexible. (Solbakken, Hansen & Monsen, 2011).

== Continuum ==
A person with a low level of affect consciousness is expected to be unable to make sense of both their own feelings and the emotions of others and to have difficulties attributing causes for their own and others' behaviors. A person with high AC is expected to make sense of both their and others' emotions.

Solbakken et al. describes the variations in AC in three levels of conscious. "At low levels these scales indicate poor awareness and recognition of affects, a tendency for being overwhelmed by, unable to cope with and unable to decode meaningful information from affect activation, along with disavowal and shutdown of bodily expressive acts and inability to articulate and express semantic descriptions of affective experience. At intermediate levels affects are stably recognized and accepted, and both bodily expressive acts and semantic articulation of experience are generally acknowledged. Finally, high levels are characterized by capacity for focused and flexible awareness of nuances specific to different contexts and affect intensities, distinct openness to affective activation and its motivating and regulating functions, along with explicit reflection about the information inherent in the affect with its meanings and consequences for one's understanding of both self and others. At this level the nonverbal and conceptual expressions of affects are clear, nuanced, authentic and characterized by the experience of choice, responsibility and awareness of others' reactions to one's communications (or lack thereof)".

== Clinical applications ==
=== Psychotherapy Model ===
A specific AC-psychotherapy treatment model (ACT – not to be confused with acceptance and commitment therapy, which is a more recent model) has been developed and systematically tested (Monsen et al., 1995a, b) for treating severe and complex mental disorders. It has later been revised and tested in a randomized controlled study with chronic pain patients (Monsen & Monsen, 1999, 2000). A recent revision of the model has been written by Monsen & Solbakken (2013) and is currently being tested empirically.

=== Psychopathology ===
As noted by Solbakken et al., affect consciousness scores (both overall mean of all aspect-scores across affects and scores on each integrating aspect, and discrete affects) are strongly correlated with relevant measures of psychological dysfunction. These data shows a possible relationship between psychopathology and affect consciousness. Affect integration (operationalized through Affect Consciousness constructs and measured with the ACI and ACS) at different levels shows a stable correlation of psychopathology and psychological dysfunction such as symptom severity, interpersonal problems, personality disorder traits, and general functioning. Furthermore, the integration of specific affects have been shown to have distinct and predictable relationships with various types of relational problems.

=== As a predictor of change in psychotherapy ===
It has been shown that in brief time-limited psychotherapy high levels of affect consciousness predict more extensive changes in symptoms and problems. On the other hand, Solbakken, Hansen, Havik, & Monsen demonstrated that in open-ended psychotherapy focusing on the experience and expression of emotion, low levels of AC at the onset of treatment predicted greater changes in symptoms, relational difficulties, and personality disorder traits. Thus, under such psychotherapeutic conditions low AC represent primarily an increased potential for change.

== Mentalization ==
It has been suggested that affect consciousness and the concept of mentalization partly overlap. Both mentalization theory and affect consciousness theory argue that the child's experience and expression of affects develop in relationship (primarily between one or more primary caregivers and the infant). On the other hand, affect consciousness theory focuses more strongly on the biological foundations for affect differentiation and the adaptive properties inherent in discrete affects while emphasizing the individual's own perception and organization of their own affects.
