= Mood (psychology) =

Relatively long lasting emotional, internal and subjective state

In psychology, a mood is an affective state. In contrast to emotions or feelings, moods are less specific, less intense and less likely to be provoked or instantiated by a particular stimulus or event. Moods are typically described as having either a positive or negative valence. In other words, people usually talk about being in a good mood or a bad mood. There are many different factors that influence mood, and these can lead to positive or negative effects on mood.

Mood also differs from temperament or personality traits which are even longer-lasting. Nevertheless, personality traits such as optimism and neuroticism predispose certain types of moods. Long-term disturbances of mood such as clinical depression and bipolar disorder are considered mood disorders. Mood is an internal, subjective state, but it often can be inferred from posture and other behaviors. "We can be sent into a mood by an unexpected event, from the happiness of seeing an old friend to the anger of discovering betrayal by a partner. We may also fall into a mood."

== Etymology ==
Etymologically, the word mood derives from the Old English mōd which denoted military courage, but could also refer to a person's humor, temper, or disposition at a particular time. The cognate Gothic mōds translates both θυμός "mood, spiritedness" and ὀργή "anger".

The English word "mood" which means emotional condition or state of mind was originally derived from the Proto-Germanic root "moda-".

== Types of mood ==
=== Positive mood ===
Positive mood can be caused by many different aspects of life, and can have certain effects on people as a whole. Good mood is usually considered a state without an identified cause; people cannot pinpoint exactly why they are in a good mood. People seem to experience a positive mood when they have a clean slate, have had a good night's sleep, and feel no sense of stress in their life.

People tend to be generally in a good mood. There have been many studies done on the effect of positive emotion on the cognitive mind and there is speculation that positive mood can affect our minds in good or bad ways. Generally, positive mood has been found to enhance creative problem solving and flexible yet careful thinking. Some studies have stated that positive moods let people think creatively, freely, and be more imaginative. Positive mood can also help individuals in situations in which heavy thinking and brainstorming are involved. In one experiment, individuals who were induced with a positive mood enhanced performance on the Remote Associates Task (RAT), a cognitive task that requires creative problem solving. Moreover, the study also suggests that being in a positive mood broadens or expands the breadth of attentional selection such that information that may be useful to the task at hand becomes more accessible for use. Consequently, greater accessibility of relevant information facilitates successful problem solving. Positive mood also facilitates resistance to temptations, especially with regard to unhealthy food choices. Interpersonal relationships have also been shown to have an effect on maintaining a positive mood. Social activities correlate with positive mood as well indicating that social interactions with people may increase an individual's positive mood. Therefore, people who are isolated from society or in the out-group may have a more negative mood than individuals that have a strong social circle.

Positive mood has also been proven to show negative effects on cognition as well. According to the article, "Positive mood is associated with implicit use of distraction". "There is also evidence that individuals in positive moods show disrupted performance, at least when distracting information is present". The article states that other things in their peripheral views can easily distract people who are in good moods; an example of this would be if you were trying to study in the library (considering you are in a positive mood) you see people constantly walking around or making small noises. The study is basically stating that it would be harder for positive moods to focus on the task at hand. In particular, happy people may be more sensitive to the hedonic consequences of message processing than sad people. Thus, positive moods are predicted to lead to decreased processing only when thinking about the message threatens mood. In comparison, if message processing allows a person to maintain or enhance a pleasant state, then positive moods need not lead to lower levels of message scrutiny than negative moods. It is assumed that initial information regarding the source either confirms or opposes mood-congruent expectations. Specifically, a positive mood may lead to more positive expectations concerning source trustworthiness or likability than a negative mood. As a consequence, people in a positive mood should be more surprised when they encounter an untrustworthy or disliked source rather than a trustworthy or liked source.

=== Negative mood ===
Like positive moods, negative moods have important implications for human mental and physical wellbeing. Moods are basic psychological states that can occur as a reaction to an event or can surface for no apparent external cause. Since there is no specific object that causes the negative mood, it has no specific start and stop date. It can last for hours, days, weeks, or longer. Negative moods can manipulate how individuals interpret and translate the world around them, and can also direct their behavior.

Negative moods can affect an individual's judgment and perception of objects and events. In a study done by Niedenthal and Setterland (1994), research showed that individuals are tuned to perceive things that are congruent with their current mood. Negative moods, mostly low-intensity, can control how humans perceive emotion-congruent objects and events. For example, Niedenthal and Setterland used music to induce positive and negative moods. Sad music was used as a stimulus to induce negative moods, and participants labeled other things as negative. This proves that people's current moods tend to affect their judgments and perceptions. These negative moods may lead to problems in social relationships. For example, one maladaptive negative mood regulation is an overactive strategy in which individuals dramatize their negative feelings in order to provoke support and feedback from others and to guarantee their availability. A second type of maladaptive negative mood regulation is a disabling strategy in which individuals suppress their negative feelings and distance themselves from others in order to avoid frustrations and anxiety caused by others' unavailability.

Negative moods have been connected with depression, anxiety, aggression, poor self-esteem, physiological stress and decrease in sexual arousal. In some individuals, there is evidence that depressed or anxious mood may increase sexual interest or arousal. In general, men were more likely than women to report increased sexual drive during negative mood states. Negative moods are labeled as nonconstructive because they can affect a person's ability to process information, making the person focus solely on the sender of a message, while people in positive moods will pay more attention to both the sender and the context of a message. This can lead to problems in social relationships with others.

Negative moods, such as anxiety, often lead individuals to misinterpret physical symptoms. According to Jerry Suls, a professor at the University of Iowa, people who are depressed and anxious tend to be in rumination. However, although an individual's affective states can influence somatic changes, these individuals are not hypochondriacs.

Although negative moods are generally characterized as bad, not all negative moods are necessarily damaging. The Negative State Relief Model states that human beings have an innate drive to reduce negative moods. People can reduce their negative moods by engaging in any mood-elevating behavior (called Mood repair strategies), such as helping behavior, as it is paired with positive-valence behaviors such as smiling and thanks. Thus negative mood increases helpfulness because helping others can reduce one's own bad feelings.

== Factors which affect mood ==
=== Lack of sleep ===
Sleep has a complex, and, as yet, not fully understood, relationship with mood. Most commonly, if a person is sleep deprived they will become more irritable, angry, and prone to stress. They will also become less energized throughout the day. "Studies have shown that even partial sleep deprivation has a significant effect on mood. University of Pennsylvania researchers found that subjects who were limited to only 4.5 hours of sleep a night for one week reported feeling more stressed, angry, sad, and mentally exhausted. When the subjects resumed normal sleep, they reported a dramatic improvement in mood." Generally, evening-oriented people, as compared to morning-oriented people, show decreased energy and pleasantness and increased tension.

However, in a subset of cases, sleep deprivation can, paradoxically, lead to increased energy and alertness and lead to enhanced mood. This effect is most marked in persons with an evening orientation (so called night-owls) and people suffering from depression. For this reason, sleep deprivation has sometimes been used as a treatment for major depressive disorder.

=== Environment ===
Nature can also have a positive effect on mood. Studies have shown that exposure to natural environments increases positive affect and decreases negative affect, meaning that one's mood is often better when in a nature setting. An example of this is how direct exposure to sunlight has been shown to improve mood and has been used to treat symptoms of depression. Further, walking outdoors as opposed to walking indoors made individuals much happier, which additionally illustrates that nature has a positive effect on our mood. While nature often improves our mood, it can worsen it as well. There is a common mood disorder called Seasonal Affective Disorder (SAD) that often occurs during the winter months when there is less daylight and it is colder outside. SAD is characterized by depressed mood, increased appetite, and increased sleep. This displays how an individual's mood can be negatively affected by nature as well. Studies have also shown that depending on the season, temperature can regulate mood.

=== Nutrition ===
Traditional dietary patterns characterized by vegetables, fruit, meat, fish, and whole grains, as opposed to a western pattern diet characterized by processed foods, refined grains, sugary products, and beer were associated with lower odds for major depression or dysthymia (mood disorder) and for anxiety disorders in women. Red meat is found to be protective against mood and anxiety disorders. Fruits and vegetables are associated with positive mood, independent of demographic or lifestyle factors. Research indicates that alcohol and energy drinks are associated with mood changes.

=== Facial expression ===
Research studies indicate that voluntary facial expressions, such as smiling, can produce effects on the body that are similar to those that result from the actual emotion, such as happiness. Paul Ekman and his colleagues studied facial expressions of emotions and linked specific emotions to the movement of corresponding facial muscles. Each basic emotion is associated with a distinctive facial expression, due to feedback from the expression that contributes to the emotional feeling. Ekman found that these expressions of emotion are universal and recognizable across widely divergent cultures.

=== Hormones ===
Hormones, which change with age, can also determine what type of mood someone is in and how well they are able to regulate their moods.

== Mood disorders ==
Depression, chronic stress, bipolar disorder, etc. are considered mood disorders. It has been suggested that such disorders result from chemical imbalances in the brain's neurotransmitters, however some research challenges this hypothesis. There seems to be a relationship between melatonin and mood disorders.

== Social mood ==
The idea of social mood as a "collectively shared state of mind" (Nofsinger 2005; Olson 2006) is attributed to Robert Prechter and his socionomics. The notion is used primarily in the field of economics.

In sociology, philosophy, and psychology, crowd behavior is the formation of a common mood directed toward an object of attention.

== See also ==
- Affect (psychology)
- Affect measures
- Dysthymia
- Emotion
- Feeling
- Hypomania
- Mood swing
