= International Affective Picture System =

Picture database on emotion and attention

The International Affective Picture System (IAPS) is a database of pictures designed to provide a standardized set of pictures for studying emotion and attention that has been widely used in psychological research. The IAPS was developed by the National Institute of Mental Health Center for Emotion and Attention at the University of Florida. In 2005, the IAPS comprised 956 color photographs ranging from everyday objects and scenes − such as household furniture and landscapes − to extremely rare or exciting scenes − such as mutilated bodies and erotic nudes.

== Normative Ratings ==
It is the essential property of the IAPS that the stimulus set is accompanied by a detailed list of average ratings of the emotions elicited by each picture. This shall enable other researchers to select stimuli eliciting a specific range of emotions for their experiments when using the IAPS. The process of establishing such average ratings for a stimulus set is also referred to as standardization by psychologists.

The normative rating procedure for the IAPS is based on the assumption that emotional assessments can be accounted for by the three dimensions of valence, arousal and dominance. Thus, participants taking part in the studies that are conducted to standardize the IAPS are asked to rate how pleasant/unpleasant, how calm/excited and how controlled/in-control they felt when looking at each picture. A graphic rating scale, the Self-Assessment Manikin (SAM), is used for this rating procedure.

=== Original norms ===
The official normative ratings for the IAPS pictures were obtained from a sample of 100 college students (50 women, 50 men, presumably predominantly US-American) who each rated 20 sets of 60 pictures. The rating was carried out in groups using paper-and-pencil versions of the SAMs. Pictures were presented for 6 seconds each; 15 seconds were given to rate the picture. Average valence, arousal and control/dominance ratings are available for the overall sample, and with men or women broken out separately.

Normative ratings were also obtained from children ages 7–9 years, 10-12, and 13-14. The rating procedure for children was mildly adapted; among other modifications, children were tested in classrooms, given instructions in a more child-friendly language, and they were allotted 20 seconds to rate each picture instead of 15.

=== Norms from further studies ===
Researchers from institutes other than the National Institute of Mental Health have also conducted studies to establish normative ratings for the IAPS in languages other than English and cultures other than US-American culture including Hungarian, German, Portuguese, Indian, and Spanish. One of these studies also included older participants (63–77 years).

== Use of the IAPS pictures ==
IAPS pictures have been used in studies using a variety of psychophysiological measurements such as fMRI, EEG, magnetoencephalography, skin conductance, heart rate, and electromyography.

The IAPS has also been used in the psychology laboratory to experimentally manipulate anxiety and induce negative affect, enabling researchers to investigate the impacts of negative affect on cognitive performance.

== Access ==
To maintain novelty and efficacy of the stimulus set, the IAPS images themselves are typically not shown in any media outlet or publications. The IAPS may be received and used upon request by members of recognized, degree-granting, academic, not-for-profit research or educational institutions.

== Alternatives ==
=== Image sets ===
A group of researchers at Harvard University has published an alternative set of images that they claim to be comparable to the IAPS in 2016. The OASIS image database consists of 900 images that have been rated on valence and arousal by a sample of US-Americans recruited via amazon mechanical Turk. As opposed to the IAPS, all OASIS images are in the public domain. A detailed description is provided on the first author's homepage.

Other alternative databases of photographic images of scenes with various kinds of affective content include:

- Besançon Affective Picture Set-adult (BAPS-Adult)
- Categorized Affective Pictures Database (CAP-D)
- Complex Affective Scene Set (COMPASS)
- DIsgust-RelaTed-Images (DIRTI) database
- EmoMadrid
- Geneva Affective Picture Database (GAPED)
- Image Stimuli for Emotion Elicitation (ISEE)
- Natural Disasters Picture System (NDPS)
- Nencki Affective Picture System (NAPS)
- Set of Fear Inducing Pictures (SFIP)
- Socio-Moral Image Database (SMID)

=== Other mediums ===
The authors of the IAPS have developed a number of non-image alternatives for eliciting emotion such as the Affective Norms for English Words (ANEW) and International Affective Digitized Sounds (IADS).
