= Decatastrophizing =

Cognitive restructuring technique to treat cognitive distortions

In cognitive therapy, decatastrophizing or decatastrophization is a cognitive restructuring technique to treat cognitive distortions, such as magnification and catastrophizing, commonly seen in psychological disorders like anxiety and psychosis.

The technique consists of confronting the worst-case scenario of a feared event or object, using mental imagery to examine whether the effects of the event or object have been overestimated (magnified or exaggerated) and where the patient's coping skills have been underestimated. The term was coined by Albert Ellis, and various versions of the technique have been developed, most notably by Aaron T. Beck.

Decatastrophizing is also called the "what if" technique, because the worst-case scenario is confronted by asking: "What if the feared event or object happened, what would occur then?"

The following is an example:

"I could make an absolute fool of myself if I say the wrong thing."
"What if you say the wrong thing, what would happen then?"
"He might think I'm weird." ...

== See also ==
- Cognitive distortion
- Cognitive behavioral therapy
