= Zygomaticus =

Zygomaticus may refer to:

- Zygomatic bone
- Zygomaticus minor muscle
- Zygomaticus major muscle
