= Physiology & Behavior =

- Discipline: Behavioral neuroscience, physiology
- Language: English
- Edited by: Derek Daniels

Publication details
- History: 1966–present
- Publisher: Elsevier
- Frequency: 15/year
- Impact factor: 2.7 (2025)

Standard abbreviations
- ISO 4: Physiol. Behav.

Indexing
- CODEN: PHBHA4
- ISSN: 0031-9384 (print); 1873-507X (web)
- LCCN: 66009937
- OCLC no.: 643803838

Links
- Journal homepage; Online archive

Physiology & Behavior is a peer-reviewed scientific journal published by Elsevier. It covers the fields of behavioral neuroendocrinology, psychoneuroimmunology, learning and memory, ingestion, social behavior, and studies related to the mechanisms of psychopathology. It was established in 1966 with Matthew J. Wayner as its founding editor-in-chief. The current editor-in-chief is Derek Daniels (University at Buffalo).

== Abstracting and indexing ==
The journal is abstracted and indexed in BIOSIS, Chemical Abstracts, Current Contents/Life Sciences, Index Medicus/MEDLINE/PubMed, PsycINFO, Science Citation Index Expanded, Social Sciences Citation Index, and Scopus. According to the Journal Citation Reports, the journal has a 2025 impact factor of 2.7.
