= Zajonc =

Zajonc or Zayonc (Polish pronunciation: ['zajɔnts]) is a surname. It is a spelling variant of Zając, meaning "hare" in Polish. Notable people with the surname include:

- Arthur Zajonc (born 1949), American physicist and writer
- Miroslav Zajonc or Miro Zayonc (born 1960), American luger
- Rick Zayonc (born 1959), Canadian water polo player
- Robert Zajonc (1923–2008), American social psychologist

== Fictional characters ==
- Inga Zajonc, "Polish beauty", childhood friend of Ostap Bender

== See also ==
- 32294 Zajonc, a main belt asteroid
- Jeffrey Zients (born 1966), an American business executive and government official
