= Self-Assessment Manikin =

Scale used to measure affect

The Self-Assessment Manikin (SAM) is a non-verbal pictorial questionnaire that directly measures a person's affect and feelings in response to exposure to an object or an event, such as a picture. It is widely used by scientists to determine emotional reactions of participants during psychology experiments due to its non-verbal nature. It was developed by Margaret Bradley and Peter Lang, and consists of three rows of pictograms, each of which uses a stylized diagram to show a five-point scale in each of the three domain: valence, arousal and dominance.

SAM was derived from the Semantic Differential Scale of Affect, but was modified to be non-verbal and more efficient as it reduces the number of judgements required from 18 to 3. It is also aimed to be used across non-English speaking cultures and in populations which are less linguistically advanced, such as with children.

== Description ==
In the valence domain (sometimes referred to as "pleasure"), SAM ranges from a smiling, happy figure to a frowning figure. It ranges from a fully awake figure with a large star-like figure across its chest to a sleeping figure in the arousal domain, and figures of increasing sizes in the dominance domain.

Written transcriptions of the image rating scale is as below:

Scale	Valence rating	Arousal rating	Dominance rating
5	Pleasant	Excited	Dependent
4	Pleased	Wide-awake	Powerlessness
3	Neutral	Neutral	Neutral
2	Unsatisfied	Dull	Powerful
1	Unpleasant	Calm	Independent

== History ==
Previously, one of the most commonly used scale to evaluate emotional response was the Semantic Differential. However, according to Lang, this method is costly in both time and effort used by researchers and participants to complete the experiment, and requires statistical expertise, such as factor analysis, for resolution, which may not be accessible for all researchers. In addition, the nature of the scale being verbal/written makes it questionable as to whether participant groups low in linguistic ability, such as children or people who are developmentally challenged like aphasics, can accurately answer the survey. Since the official survey is only published in English, non-English speaking cultures are also required to translate and validate it individually before using it. An improvement on this survey is hence determined to be pictoral.

Lang and his colleagues conducted research in 1993 to identify aspects of physical responses in humans that corresponded the best with emotional responses. The 1993 results indicated a strong correlation between facial expressions and affective valence judgements, and consistent correlation between pleasure and arousal and physiological response. These evaluative judgements are judged to be an accurate measure of emotion and three features—valence, arousal and dominance—are ultimately picked to be included in SAM.

SAM was originally implemented as an interactive computer program, and was expanded to a pencil and paper version later. Subjects place an "x" over any of the five figures in each domain, or in between any two figures to create a 9-point scale. The current computer version of the scale involves a dynamically changing SAM figure along a 20-point scale for each of the three domains.

== Applications ==
SAM is used to measure emotional responses in many situations, such as reaction to pictures, images, sounds, advertisements and pain. SAM has also been used to evaluate emotional responses to virtual reality (VR). Due to the short duration required to administer the test, SAM has been used to measure emotional change before and after physical challenges.

== Accuracy and effectiveness ==
SAM has been compared to the Semantic Diffential Scale of Affect and has shown high degrees of correlation in experienced pleasure and felt arousal, and it is suggested that SAM may be a better tracker for personal response to affective stimulus, as it reflects the subject's feelings of control in the situation rather than the pictured object's control of feelings according to the Semantic Differential.

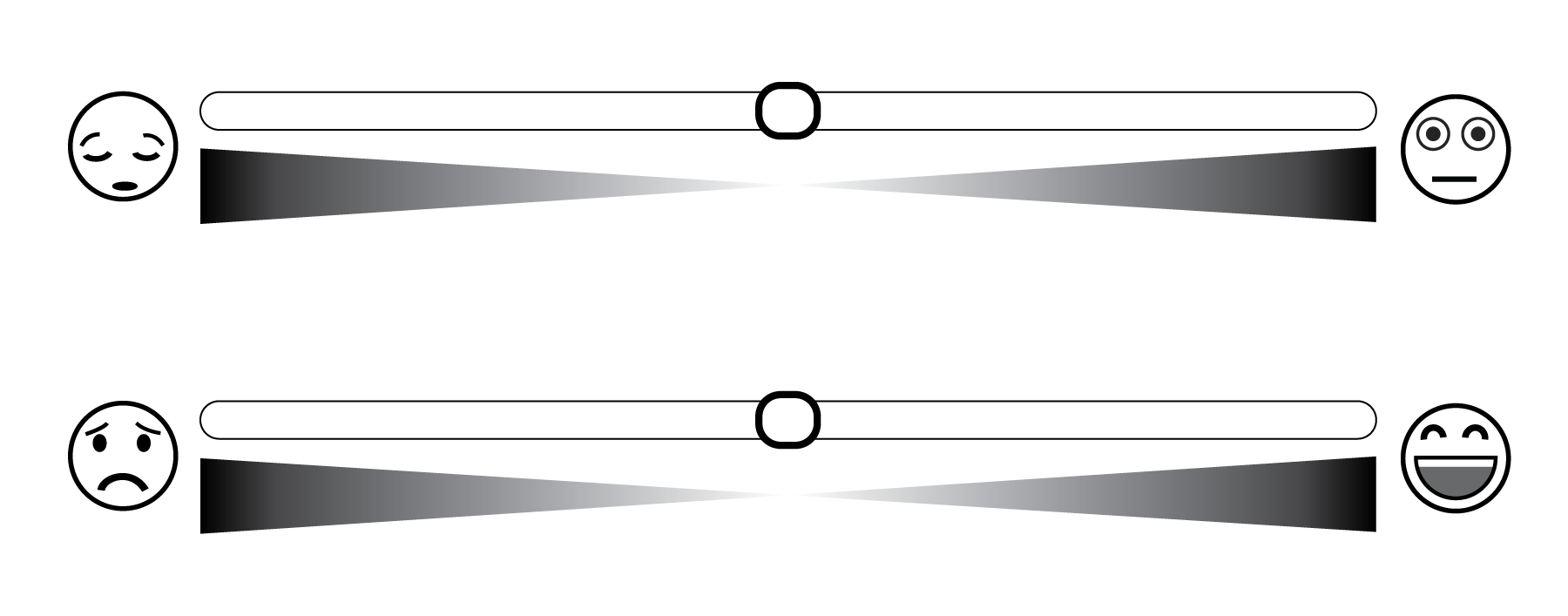
The Affective Slider

A new scale, called the Affective Slider, was developed in 2016 by Alberto Betella and Paul Verschure. This scale uses a self-reporting tool with two sliders for assessment for pleasure and arousal. It is said to be more compatible with mobile devices than SAM and do not require written instructions. The study, which uses both the Affective Slider and SAM, also showed a decrease in arousal ratings in both measures compared to the beginning of SAM's implementation, which may indicate that SAM is not as effective in recent years due to "general desensitization towards highly arousing content".

== See also ==
- Likert scale
- Semantic Differential
- Affect
