= Piano Concerto No. 2 in C minor =

Piano Concerto No. 2 in C minor may refer to:

- Piano Concerto No. 2 (Medtner)
- Piano Concerto No. 2 (Rachmaninoff)
- Piano Concerto No. 2 (Sauer)
- Piano Concerto No. 2 (Scharwenka)
- Piano Concerto No. 2 (Stanford)
- Piano Concerto No. 2 (Widor)
