= Symmetric Vision =

Latvian psychedelic artist

- Other names: Raimonds Jermaks; StingrayZ
- Education: Vidzeme University of Applied Sciences
- Occupation: Psychedelic digital artist
- Years active: 2014–present
- Known for: Psychedelic replications
- Website: symmetric-vision.xyz youtube.com/@SymmetricVision

Symmetric Vision, also known by his real name Raimonds Jermaks, is a Latvian visual effects (VFX) artist who creates psychedelic replications. Replications are realistic recreations of the visual and/or auditory effects of hallucinogens such as psychedelic drugs like LSD and DMT. Symmetric Vision creates replications professionally and is regarded as the most prominent artist in this field. He has worked in the area of replications since 2014 and publishes his psychedelic digital art on his website, on social media sites like YouTube and Reddit, and in the past on PsychonautWiki. Symmetric Vision won the Qualia Research Institute (QRI)'s Psychedelic Cryptography contest in 2023. He has also been involved in visual effects work in scientific research, for instance development of a virtual reality system called Viscereality intended to augment altered states of consciousness.
