= Cognitive reframing =

Type of psychological therapy

Cognitive reframing is a psychological technique that consists of identifying and then changing the way situations, experiences, events, ideas and emotions are viewed. Cognitive reframing is the process by which such situations or thoughts are challenged and then changed. In the context of cognitive therapy, cognitive reframing is referred to as cognitive restructuring. In psychological research on emotion regulation, the same process is studied under the term cognitive reappraisal. Research that combines the results of many studies has generally found reframing to be effective at changing how people feel, and it has been linked to better mental health and greater psychological resilience.

== History ==
Aaron T. Beck developed cognitive therapy in the 1960s. Through working with patients diagnosed with depression, he found that negative thoughts would persist in the minds of these patients. Beck helped his patients recognize the impact of their negative thoughts, and aided them in shifting their mindset to think more positively. This eventually led to the lessening of, or sometimes getting rid of, the patients' depression. The technique of changing such thoughts, known as "cognitive restructuring", is associated with many early cognitive-behavioral approaches, including Beck's cognitive therapy, Albert Ellis's rational emotive behavior therapy, and Marvin Goldfried's systematic rational restructuring. Using cognitive restructuring as a tool in therapeutic settings led other researchers to recognize that this process happens outside the clinic, and would lead them to develop the term "cognitive reframing" as a way to describe the more generalized process.

== Relationship to cognitive reappraisal ==
As a form of cognitive reappraisal, reframing has been defined as reinterpreting a situation in order to change its emotional impact. In James Gross's process model of emotion regulation, reappraisal works early, changing how a situation is understood before an emotional reaction has fully developed. This sets it apart from strategies such as expressive suppression, in which a person holds back or hides an emotion after it has already arisen.

== Effectiveness ==
Research that pools the results of many studies has found that reframing works: it helps people change how they feel, and reframing a situation itself tends to be more effective than trying to control the emotion once it has taken hold. People who reframe their thoughts also struggle less with problems like anxiety and depression, though this connection is weaker than the one seen for habits such as dwelling on bad feelings or trying to avoid them.

== Neural basis ==
Brain-imaging research that combines the results of many studies has found that reframing draws on parts of the brain involved in thinking and self-control, including the prefrontal cortex at the front of the brain, and that it lowers activity in the amygdala, an area that helps drive emotional reactions.

== Mental health and resilience ==
People who regularly reframe their thinking tend to have better mental health, including greater satisfaction with life and lower levels of depression and anxiety, while those who instead hold in or hide their emotions tend to fare worse. Reframing has also been linked to greater psychological resilience, meaning it may help people cope with and recover from stress and hardship.

== Therapeutic uses ==
Cognitive reframing can be useful in many ways, such as when trying to improve memory, reduce test anxiety, and helping parents and children cope with disabilities. For example, people with memory problems were told that their memory could be improved by shifting their perspective on their problem. After receiving treatment, their memory improved. Another example are parents with disabled children. Some parents harbored negative thoughts about their disabled children. Cognitive reframing helped these parents to view their children and their experiences in a more positive light.

== Humor ==
One behavior that has been shown to facilitate cognitive reframing is humor, especially humor that is based on positivity, rather than mean-spirited. For example, in one study, participants were exposed to a series of unpleasant pictures. To cope with these pictures, participants were invited to create a positive joke about the picture, a negative joke about the picture, or no joke about the picture. The positive joke tended to elicit positive emotions instead of negative emotions. The authors concluded that positive humor might epitomize a variant of cognitive reframing in which individuals shift their perspective of some unfavorable event or circumstance towards a more positive outlook of the same circumstances.

== Distinctions ==
Cognitive reframing can refer to almost any conscious shift in a person's mental perspective. For this reason, it is commonly confused with both cognitive restructuring and cognitive distortion. However, there are distinct differences between the three. Reframing is the general change in a person's mindset, whether it be a positive or negative change. Restructuring is the act of therapeutically changing one's mindset to strengthen oneself—meaning that it always has a positive connotation. In this way, cognitive restructuring is a particular instance of cognitive reframing. Distortions are exaggerated and typically negative thoughts not supported by a rational thought process. If someone suffers from a series of distortions (which can lead to depression, poor decisions, and other negative results), the need for cognitive restructuring may present itself. Therefore, distortion is a problem which may be solved by cognitive reframing.

Yet another major distinguishing feature between cognitive reframing and cognitive restructuring is awareness. Cognitive reframing can happen subconsciously, while cognitive restructuring, something usually done under the guidance of a therapist, is conscious. Since cognitive restructuring is a therapeutic technique, it requires the patient to recognize and consciously shift their frame of reference to a more ‘positive’ one. However, since reframing just requires any mental frameshift, there does not need to be any conscious decision to alter one's perspective. For example, when an individual exhibits hindsight bias, they are unconsciously changing their frame of reference to retain pride and self-esteem Though the need to negatively reframe thoughts is arguably not as frequent as the need to positively reframe them, there are instances in which it is beneficial to negatively reframe thoughts. For example, in theatre, an actor may need to appear sadder or in a more negative state of mind. In order to accomplish this, he or she may alter his or her state of mind through cognitive reframing, in an attempt to appear more dysphoric externally. Another use of cognitive reframing can be seen when one tries to make one's viewpoints objective, which is shifting your perspective to be neutral and less polarized about a certain situation.
