= Mood repair strategies =

Psychological technique for mood regulation

Mood repair strategies offer techniques that an individual can use to shift their mood from general sadness or clinical depression to a state of greater contentment or happiness. A mood repair strategy is a cognitive, behavioral, and interpersonal psychological tool used to affect the mood regulation of an individual. Various mood repair strategies are most commonly used in cognitive therapy. Homework may be assigned by a therapist. However, these tools can also be used for individuals experiencing temporary unwanted moods. Many factors go into the effectiveness of mood repair strategies on an individual ranging from the client's self-esteem to their experience with the strategy being used. Even the way the mood repair strategy is presented (either to avoid negative moods or to pursue positive moods) may have an effect on that strategy's ability to improve mood.

== Background ==
Mood repair strategies have existed in a casual and unscientific way for basically all of modern human history due to general affect and the desire to change that affect when it is negative. Generally the techniques could be considered "common knowledge" but these techniques were unexplored in research. Concepts such as "think happy thoughts" and "don't listen to sad music" are commonly prescribed by friends or family to those suffering in negative moods. What remained to be seen though, was how the various individuals differed and subsequently, which of these "common knowledge" concepts should be suggested or how they should be phrased when presented. The first scholarly mention of mood repair strategies came from Joseph Forgas and Gorden Bower in 1988. Extensive listing and studying of these techniques started in the mid-1990s. It has primarily focused on the differences in the individuals to whom the mood repair strategies are given and how the strategies prove effective on each type of person. While various personality types may be more receptive to mood repair strategies it appears that there has been some success in working with all types of individuals. While professional use of mood repair strategies began primarily in the clinical cognitive psychology movement the expansion of the positive psychology movement is helping to increase the professional use of these mood repair strategies.

Cognitive mood repair strategies are primarily concerned with the ability of recognizing emotional upset and taking one of three courses of action. An individual can choose to evaluate the feelings of dysphoria and better understand the source of the negative mood to give the individual a sense of control of his or her mood. Re-evaluation can also occur which allows for individuals to take a negative situation that cause a mood and seek to find a positive perspective from the circumstance. Distraction can also occur which allows for individuals to recall mood-incongruent memories or positive thoughts in order to distract from the current upset in mood. Behavioral mood repair strategies allow for individuals to regulate their moods by the utilization of activities or tasks. Working on a task allows for individuals to temporarily distract from their current mood. Exercise also allows for a release of tension and an improvement of mood. Interpersonal mood repair strategies deal primarily with the focus of mood repair deriving from a relationship with other people. This can occur from individuals seeking out emotional support and a deeper processing of the possible circumstance that led to the negative mood. This can also be achieved by distracting the individual and being with individuals that could lift the overall positivity of the individual.

== Presentation ==
Presentation of mood repair strategies has been the primary focus of much of the research studying the efficacy of mood repair strategies. The initial thing to consider when proposing the use of a mood repair strategy is what kind of state the unhappy individual is in. If the individual is depressed, avoidance framed messages have been shown to have the greatest influence on increasing mood. This means that presenting mood repair strategies in such a way that they do not seem like they are attempting to achieve happiness, but rather to avoid sadness, are more effective. Individuals who are not clinically depressed respond better to approach framed messages of mood repair. These individuals are usually more interested in achieving happiness. Individual's perceptions of the desirability of mood change and the likelihood that a strategy may work are what bring about success.

Directing the individual seeking mood repair to engage in concrete, as opposed to abstract, processing is another important part of presentation. Abstract processing focuses on “why” questions while concrete processing is focused on moment-to-moment experiences. Concrete processing allows people to focus away from their current negative state. This kind of processing naturally coincides with the use of imagery. Pairing highly sensory imagery with emotionally relevant memory has been shown to give people the best chance at experiencing mood repair. This is taken into account when presenting mood repair strategies to people.

== Techniques ==
=== Retrieving positive memories ===
Sometimes known as distraction or Mood Incongruent Recollection, this is one of the most common mood repair strategies. Normally people engage in thoughts of mood congruence, which are ones that are in harmony with their mood. Mood incongruent recollection is usually the forced consideration of memories not related to the current mood. The theory behind this thinking is that when the mind is engaged in a track of negative mood, the forced recall of positive memories will break the cycle and force the brain to reorient into a more positive state. There are two ways to recall these memories, abstractly and concretely. An abstract recollection of memories consists of a kind of comparison between an individual's memory and their current situation. This can sometimes be helpful unless the individual has depression. A concrete recollection is when a memory is recalled especially vividly and the individual experiences the phenomenology of this memory more acutely. This has been used extensively even among those suffering with clinical depression.

=== Music ===
Music is often used for two different reasons in mood repair strategies. The first is to allow the listener to identify themselves with the current music and to allow for some ventilation or mood attenuation. The other is a form of mood-repair strategy which allows the listener to take action to achieve their desired mood. These two approaches are considered the mood-congruent listening approach and the mood-incongruent listening approach, respectively.

Listening to music in a mood-congruent state with those who are experiencing negative mood states such as dysphoria, or sadness, can allow for those individuals to be more likely to identify with the music that shares their current mood. This mood-congruency effect can allow for individuals engaging in the listening of mood-congruent music to become increasingly aware of their own mood. It is theorized that with a heightened sense of mood recognition, an individual is capable of being empowered by recognizing that the current mood is their own, and they are in control of their mood. With a greater sense of empowerment over one's emotional state, individuals can take steps in which to take their control and change their current unwanted mood. The acknowledgment of a person's mood is a critical precursor in attempts made to regulate moods.

Listening to music in a mood-incongruent state, such as someone sad listening to happy music, allows for possible mood attenuation through distraction, and enforces positive thoughts for the individual such as feelings of happiness, encouragement, a sense of hope, a change in perception, etc. In mood attenuation through distraction people are allowed time to “cool off” and let their heightened mood dwindle. Enforcing feelings of positivity can allow for the participant to model his or her actions and behaviors towards ones that are congruent with the type of music that is being used.

=== Social support ===
While many forms of mood repair strategies are individualistic in their approach, social support allows for individuals to engage in form of repair that focuses on others. Social support can occur in many ways. Ventilation is a form of social support in which a participant is able to “vent” his or her current cause of the undesirable mood. This allows for the emotion to be released from any form of tension due to an individual ruminating on the issue and open for a reinterpretation by the listener. Gratification is a pleasurable reaction in response to a communication of the cause of unwanted mood. This type of gratification can be a reward for the participant in releasing the tension carried by the cause of the mood and a feeling of relief. Spending time with someone and engaging in an emotional activity are also considered to be forms of social support. These forms of social support allow for an individual to become distracted from the cause of the issue and allow for time to go by and allow for a process of mood attenuation. Engaging in emotional activities contrary to the emotions the participant is currently experiencing, like helping others or experiencing pleasure things, may also increase the speed of attenuation by diverting the focus of their mood towards other things.

=== Active mood management ===
Relaxation techniques are often used as mood-repair strategies to help an individual achieve a level of calm and reduce the stress or tension that can come from negative moods. These techniques are often very methodical in their approach and can be actively engaged by willing participants who are aware of how to enact them. Meditation and conscious control of breathing are two common examples.

Exercise is used to help an individual alleviate unwanted moods by physically engaging the body to activate endorphins. These endorphins bring about a sense of euphoria and can alleviate undesirable moods by participants that focus on engaging this euphoria. Exercise can also serve to distract individuals by allowing their focus to be on a specific task, such as focusing on lifting weights, or getting across the finish line, allowing less room for rumination on negative thoughts.

Stress management activities are used for mood repair strategies and the stress that is typically accompanied by them. By coping with stress through a variety of techniques individuals are able to learn how to manage their day-to-day lives and the stimuli that can be known to cause stress.

=== Sex ===
Sex is a form of direct tension reduction, which puts it in the same category as things like the consumption of drugs and alcohol. Generally engaging in sexual intercourse is a much safer and less destructive alternative to the other direct tension reducing measures. To those in a healthy, committed relationship it can prove to be a very beneficial mood repair strategy. Sexual intercourse's main purpose in mood repair is the releasing of tension. It activates the release of oxytocin in the brain that serves to calm nerves, relax muscles, and induce brief euphoria. These results each have a positive effect on unwanted moods and in combination they present a powerful reaction. The second major reason that sex constitutes as a mood repair strategy is because of the feelings of closeness it creates between the two people engaging in the action. The intimacy involved in sex serves as an important counter to the feelings of loneliness and isolation that often contribute to sadness or depression.

=== Humor ===
Humor is also a known mood-repair strategy. Humor is able to bring about a sense of attenuation and allow for individuals to engage in pleasurable activities. Engaging in activities that can evoke a humorous response can often lead individuals to laughter. Laughter is able to increase serotonin levels which are known to bring about a greater level of contentment.
