= Valence (psychology) =

Intrinsic goodness or badness of an emotion, event, object, or situation

Valence, also known as hedonic tone, is a characteristic of emotions that determines their emotional affect (intrinsic appeal or repulsion).

Positive valence corresponds to the "goodness" or attractiveness of an object, event, or situation, making it appealing or desirable. Conversely, negative valence relates to "badness" or averseness, rendering something unappealing or undesirable.

This concept is not only used to describe the intrinsic qualities of objects and events but also to categorize emotions based on their inherent attractiveness or averseness.

== History ==
The use of the term in psychology entered English with the translation from German ("Valenz") in 1935 of works of Kurt Lewin. The original German word suggests "binding", and is commonly used in a grammatical context to describe the ability of one word to semantically and syntactically link another, especially the ability of a verb to require a number of additional terms (e.g. subject and object) to form a complete sentence.

The term chemical valence has been used in physics and chemistry to describe the mechanism by which atoms bind to one another since the nineteenth century.

Utilitarian philosophers such as Jeremy Bentham have discussed ideas related to valence. Bentham created an algorithm known as felicific calculus in order to calculate the inherent goodness of an action based on the amount of pain and pleasure it is expected to produce, taking into account factors such as the duration, intensity, and extent of the pleasure and/or pain.

Transhumanist philosophers such as David Pearce and Mark Alan Walker have argued that future technologies will eventually make it feasible to artificially increase valence to superhuman levels and abolish negative valence entirely. Walker coined the term "biohappiness" to describe the idea of directly manipulating the biological roots of happiness in order to increase it. Pearce argues that suffering could eventually be eradicated entirely, stating that: "It is predicted that the world's last unpleasant experience will be a precisely dateable event." Proposed technological methods of overcoming the hedonic treadmill include wireheading (direct brain stimulation for uniform bliss), which undermines motivation and evolutionary fitness; designer drugs, offering sustainable well-being without side effects, though impractical for lifelong reliance; and genetic engineering, the most promising approach. Genetic recalibration through hyperthymia-promoting genes could raise hedonic set-points, fostering adaptive well-being, creativity, and productivity while maintaining responsiveness to stimuli. While scientifically achievable, this transformation requires careful ethical and societal considerations to navigate its profound implications.

== Phenomenology ==
Valence is an inferred criterion from instinctively generated emotions; it is the property specifying whether feelings/affects are positive, negative or neutral. The existence of at least temporarily unspecified valence is an issue for psychological researchers who reject the existence of neutral emotions (e.g. surprise, sublimation). However, other psychological researchers assume that neutral emotions exist.

Two contrasting views in the phenomenology of valence are that of a constrained valence psychology, where the most intense experiences are generally no more than 10 times more intense than the mildest, and the Heavy-Tailed Valence hypothesis, which states that the range of possible degrees of valence is far more extreme. A study conducted by the Qualia Research Institute provided evidence in support of the Heavy-Tailed Valence hypothesis. A related concept is the Symmetry Theory of Valence proposed by Michael Johnson, which states that valence (or the subjective feeling associated with a particular state of consciousness) is dependent on its symmetry.

== Measurement ==
Valence could be assigned a number and treated as if it were measured, but the validity of a measurement based on a subjective report is questionable. Measurement based on observations of facial expressions, using the Facial Action Coding System and microexpressions (see Paul Ekman) or muscle activity detected through facial electromyography, or on modern functional brain imaging may overcome this objection. The perceived emotional valence of a facial expression is represented in the right posterior superior temporal sulcus and medial prefrontal cortex.

== Examples ==
"Negative" emotions like anger and fear have a negative valence. But positive emotions like joy have a positive valence. Positively valenced emotions are evoked by positively valenced events, objects, or situations. The term is also used to describe the hedonic tone of feelings, certain behaviors (for example, approach and avoidance), goal attainment or non-attainment, and conformity with or violation of norms. Ambivalence can be viewed as conflict between positive and negative valence-carriers.

Theorists taking a valence-based approach to study affect, judgment, and choice posit that emotions with the same valence (e.g., anger and fear or pride and surprise) produce a similar influence on judgments and choices. Suffering is negative valence and the opposite of this is pleasure or happiness.

== See also ==
- Optimism bias
- Sentiment analysis
- Vedanā
