= Cannabis consumption =

Methods of marijuana administration

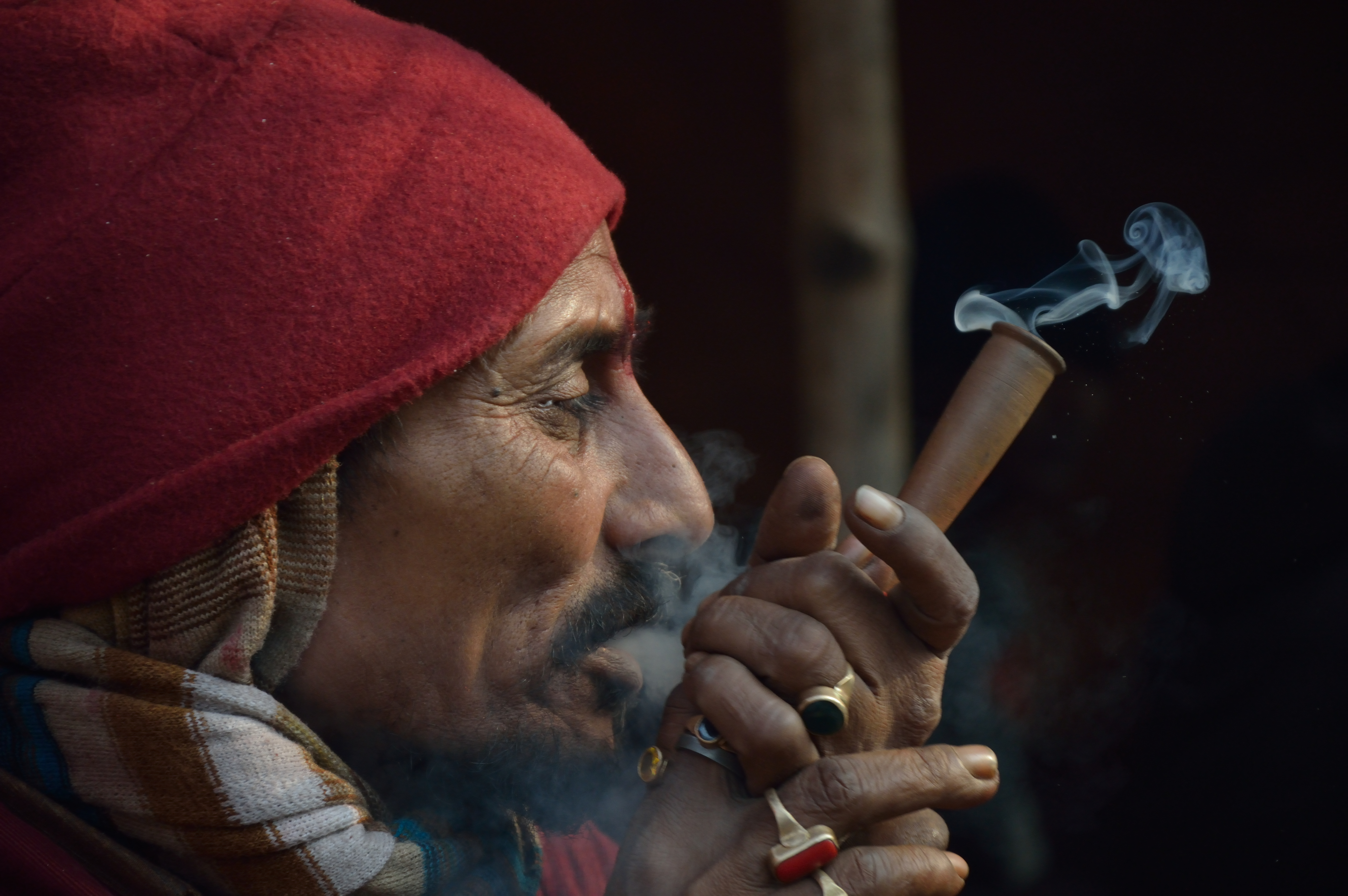
A man smoking cannabis in Kolkata, India

Cannabis consumption refers to the variety of ways cannabis is consumed, among which inhalation (smoking and vaporizing) and ingestion are most common. All consumption methods involve heating the plant's THCA to decarboxylate it into THC, either at the time of consumption or during preparation. Salves and absorption through the skin (transdermal) are increasingly common in medical uses, both of CBD, THC, and other cannabinoids. Each method leads to subtly different psychoactive effects due to the THC and other chemicals being activated, and then consumed through different administration routes. It is generally considered that smoking, which includes combustion toxins, comes on quickly but lasts for a short period of time, while eating delays the onset of effect but the duration of effect is typically longer. In a 2007 ScienceDaily report of research conducted at the University of California–San Francisco, researchers reported that vaporizer users experience the same biological effect, but without the toxins associated with smoking. Δ9-THC is the primary component when inhaled, but when eaten the liver converts this to the more psychoactive 11-hydroxy-THC form.

== Inhalation ==
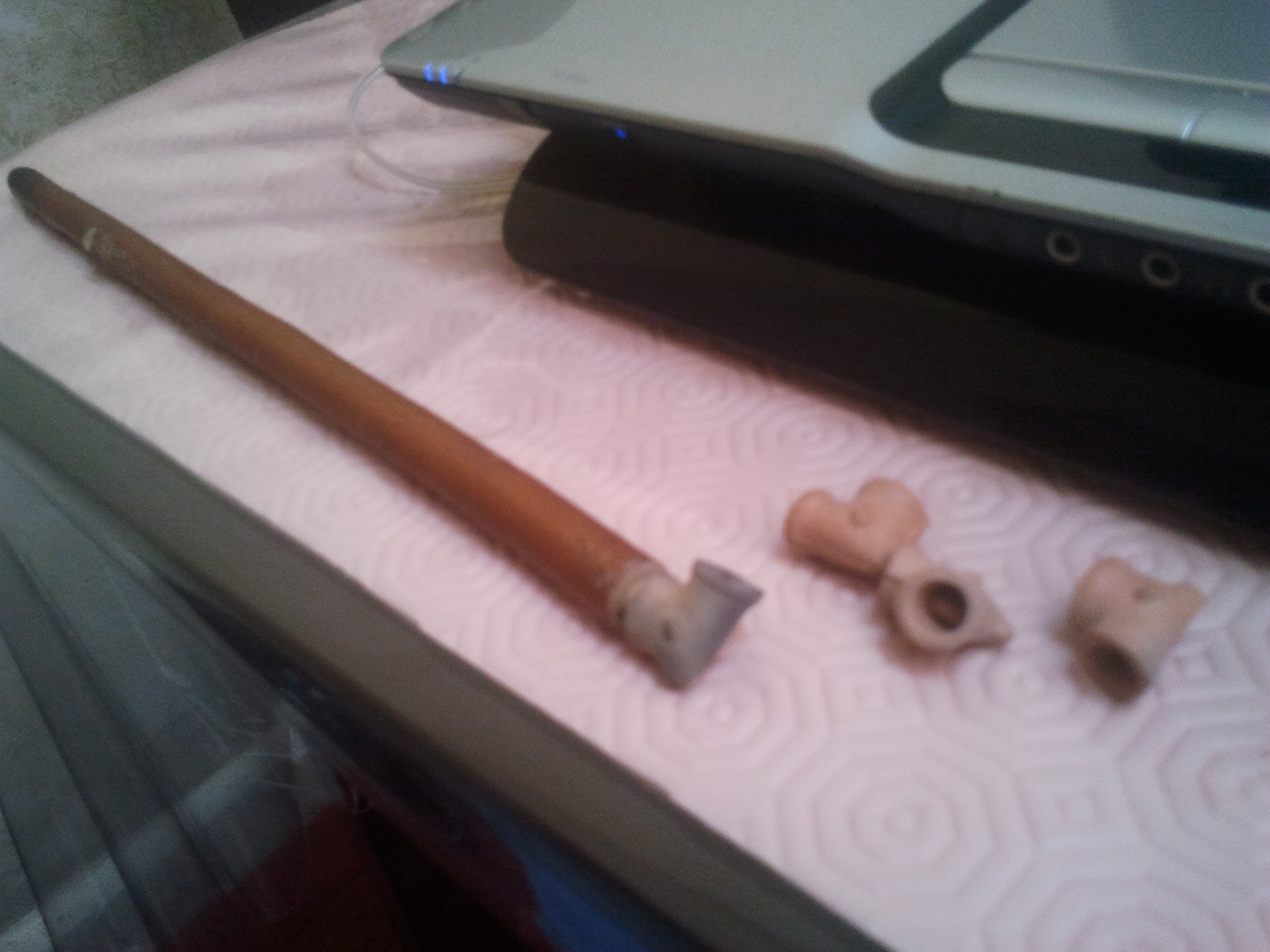
Sebsi, a Moroccan long-drawtube one-hitter

=== Smoking ===
Cannabis can be smoked with implements such as joints, blunts, bongs, and pipes. Makeshift pipes or commercial pipes may be used, or cigarette-like joint or cigar-like blunt may be smoked. Local methods have differed by the preparation of the cannabis plant before use, the parts of the cannabis plant that are used, and the treatment of the smoke before inhalation. In early times, as in some parts of Africa today, a pile of cannabis was simply laid on a fire and the smoke inhaled. Archaeological evidence confirms psychoactive cannabis was smoked at least 2,500 years ago in the Pamir Mountains.

=== Vaporization ===
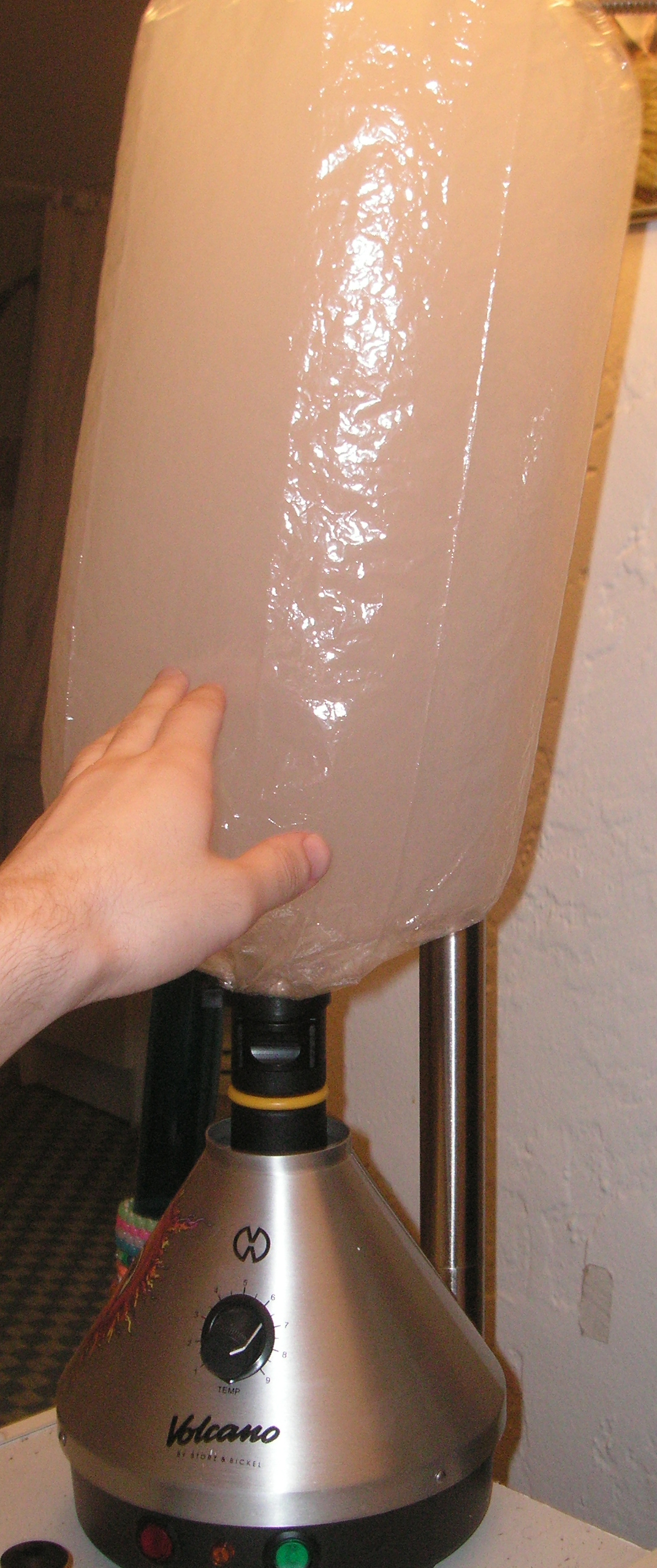
A Volcano forced-air vaporizer. The balloon, at top, fills with vapors and particulates, and can then be detached and inhaled from.

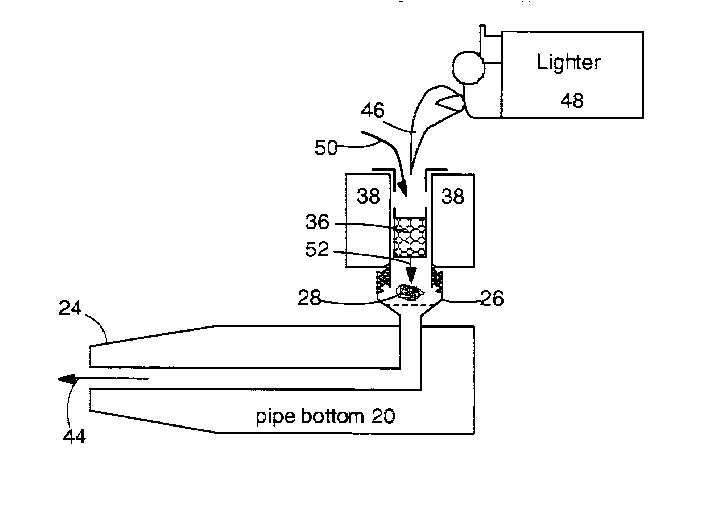
A vaporization pipe with flame filter.: 28. Insert cannabis, other herbs or essential oils here; 36. Flame filter prevents flame from igniting herb which instead is heated to vaporization temperature.

A vaporizer heats herbal cannabis to 157–210 °C (315–410 °F), which causes the active ingredients to evaporate into a gas without burning any plant material (the boiling point of THC is 157 °C (315 °F)). Vaporizing releases a lower proportion of carbon monoxide and other toxic chemicals than does smoking, although the proportion may vary depending on the design of the vaporizer and the temperature at which it is set. A MAPS–NORML study using a Volcano vaporizer reported 95% THC and no toxins delivered in the vapor. An older study using less sophisticated vaporizers found some toxins.

A pocket-sized form of a vaporizer may feature a rechargeable battery, heating chamber, and protective cover.

== Ingestion ==
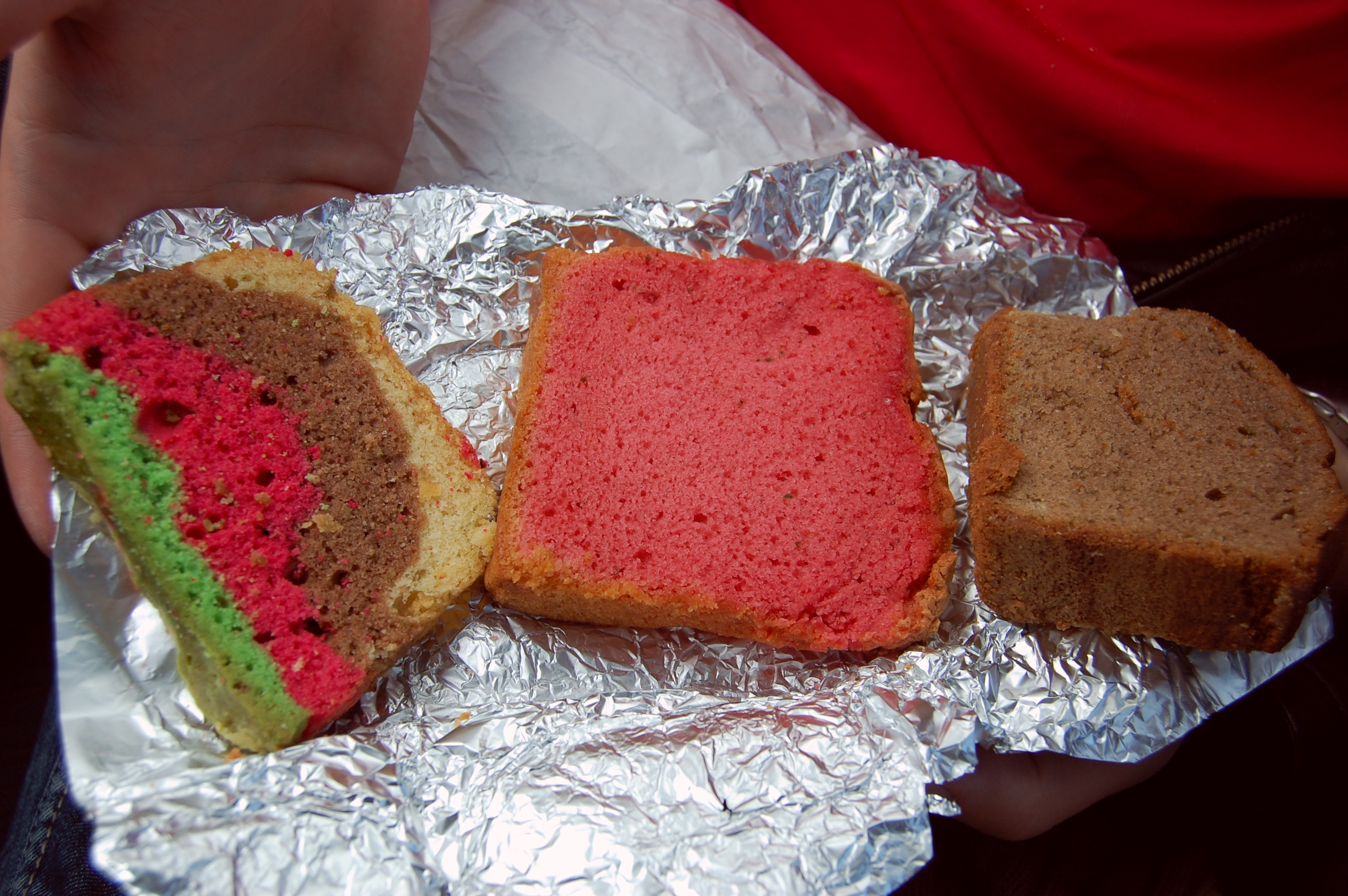
Hash cakes, also known as space cakes, are sold in coffeeshops.

As an alternative to inhalation methods, cannabis may be ingested. However, herbal cannabis must be sufficiently heated or dehydrated to cause decarboxylation of its most abundant cannabinoid, tetrahydrocannabinolic acid (THCA), into psychoactive tetrahydrocannabinol (THC).

=== Food ===
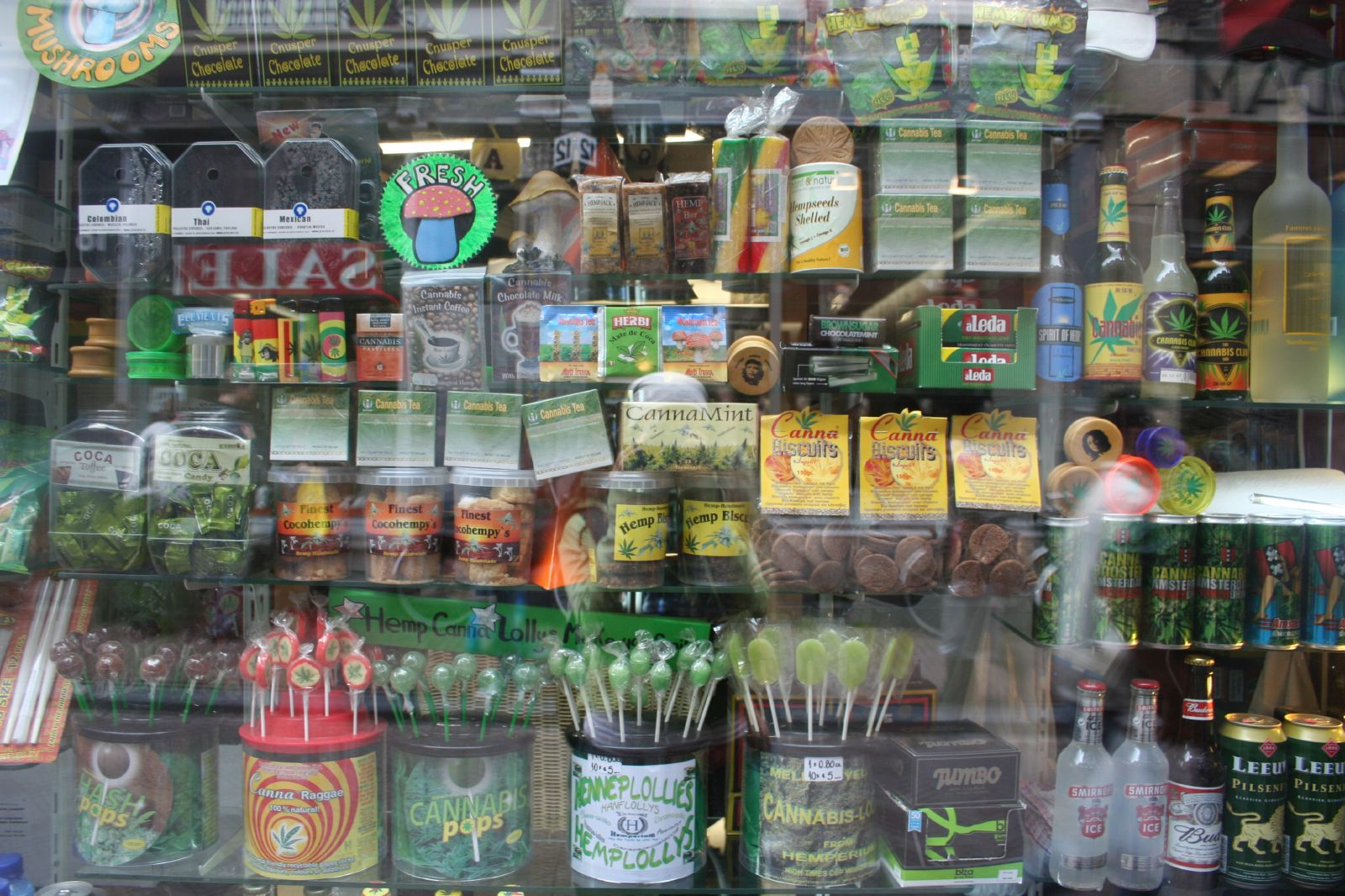
Various types of THC-infused edibles on display in an Amsterdam shop window in 2007, an expression of the lax substance control laws of The Netherlands

Although hashish is sometimes eaten raw or mixed with boiling water, THC and other cannabinoids are more efficiently absorbed into the bloodstream when combined with butter and other lipids or, less so, dissolved in ethanol. Chocolates, brownies, space cakes, and majoun are popular methods of ingestion - which are usually called edibles. The time to onset of effects depends strongly on stomach content, but is usually 1 to 2 hours, and may continue for a considerable length of time, whereas the effects of smoking or vaporizing cannabis are almost immediate, lasting a shorter length of time.

All of the active constituents enter the body when cannabis is consumed orally. It has been shown that the primary active component of cannabis, Δ9-THC, is converted to the more psychoactive 11-hydroxy-THC by the liver. Titration to the desired effect by ingestion is more difficult than through inhalation, due to the long onset time for the effects.

=== Drink ===
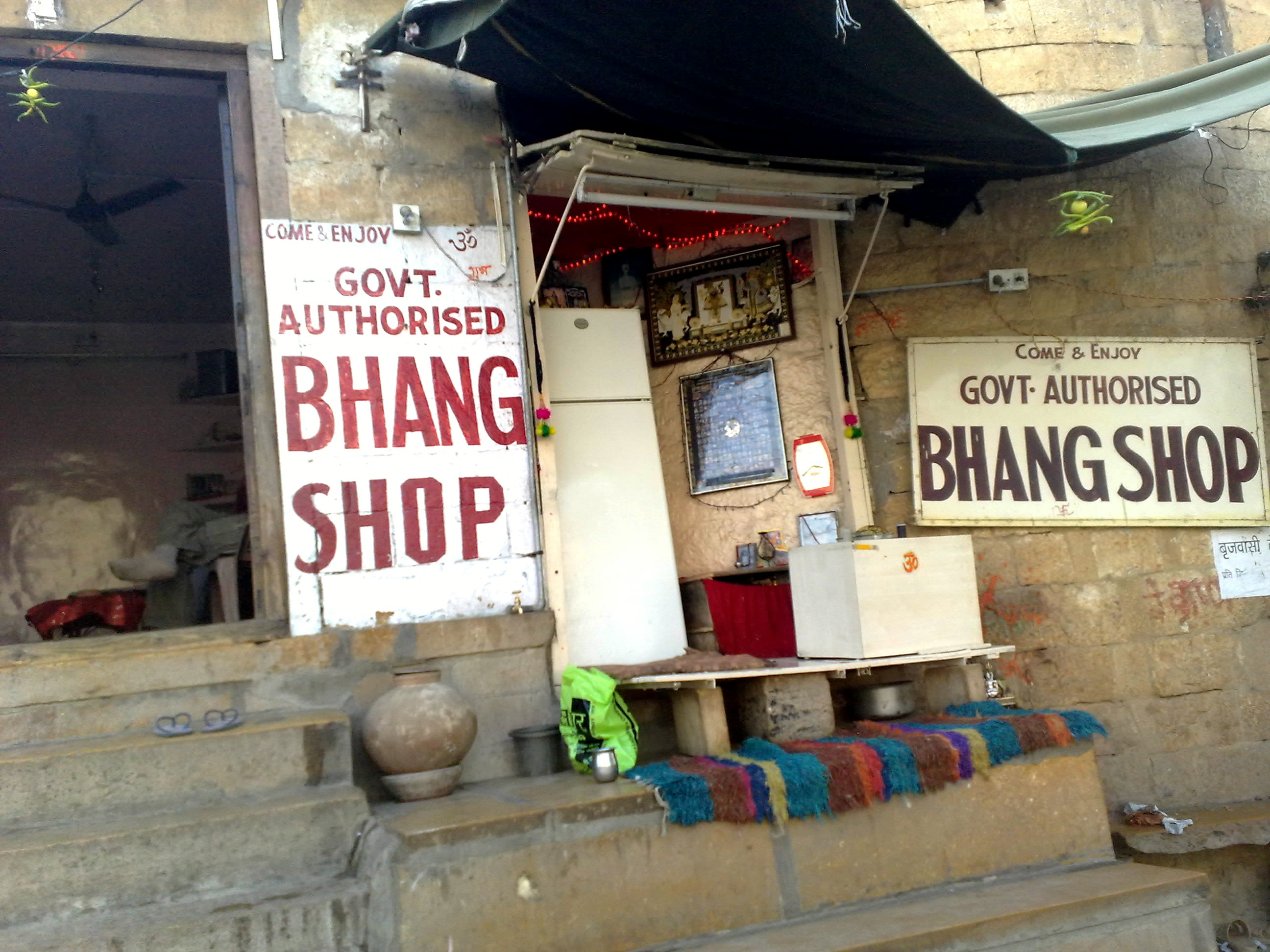
A bhang lassi (cannabis-infused drink) shop in Jaisalmer, Rajasthan, India

Cannabis material can be leached in high-proof spirits (often grain alcohol) to create a "Green Dragon".

Cannabis can also be consumed as a cannabis tea and many other beverages. Although THC is lipophilic and only slightly water soluble (with a solubility of 2.8 mg per liter), enough THC can be dissolved to make a mildly psychoactive tea. However, water-based infusions (liquid edibles) are generally considered to be an inefficient use of the herb.

Traditional cannabis-infused drinks include the Indian drinks Bhang lassi and Bhang thandai when prepared with bhang. However, bhang, a decoction of cannabis and spices in milk, averts the issue, as milk contains the fat in which the THC is soluble and first dissolved by cooking in ghee.

== See also ==
- Cannabis smoking
- Cannabis use and trauma
