= Great Legalisation Movement India =

Non-profit organisation in India

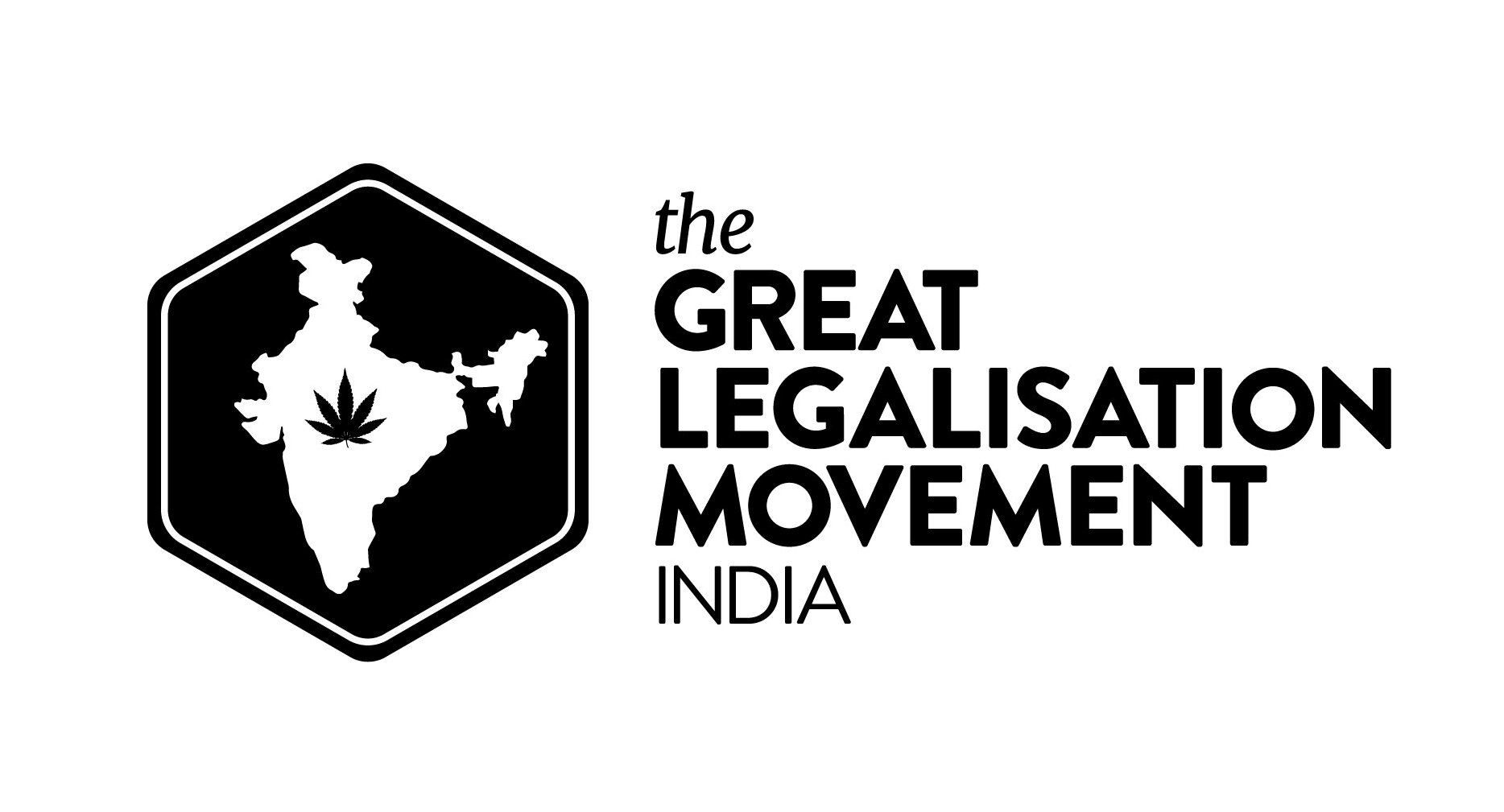
- Formation: November 2014
- Location: India
- Website: glm.org

The Great Legalisation Movement India (GLM India) is a non-profit organisation working to legalise the use of cannabis for medical and industrial purposes in India. It was founded in November 2014 by Viki Vaurora. The social stigma associated with cannabis has long been prevalent among many communities in India. The campaign aims to educate people on the history and uses of cannabis and pave way for its legalisation to initiate a nationwide green industrial setup replacing thousands of ecologically damaging products with sustainable hemp-based alternatives.

== History of cannabis use in India ==
Cannabis (Vijaya) has been used since ancient times in India, dating back to 2000 BCE. The cannabis plant has been mentioned as one of the five sacred plants in the Vedas. Bhang, an edible preparation of cannabis consumed either in the form of a drink or smoked is common during the Hindu festivals of Holi and Mahashivaratri.

== Legislation of cannabis ==
India had no legislation on narcotic substances till 1985. On 14 November 1985, the Indian government banned the use of cannabis by passing the Narcotic Drugs and Psychotropic Substances Act, 1985. Under the act, it is illegal for a person to cultivate, possess, sell, purchase and consume narcotic and psychotropic substances. Violation of the law attracts a fine and/or imprisonment depending on the quantity of the banned substance. The act has come under criticism in the country, especially with the legalisation of cannabis in some US states.

== Campaign ==
GLM India planned to launch several campaigns across cities like Bengaluru, Mumbai, Delhi and Pune. The first Medical Cannabis Conference was held in Bengaluru on 10 May 2015. Rick Simpson, a Canadian who has been using cannabis oil to treat medical conditions like cancer was the guest at the conference. The conference in Mumbai had to be cancelled after the management of the venue withdrew permission to host the meeting.

In 2018 the campaign started a web series titled The Gaanja Situation to encourage debate on the legalisation of cannabis for medical and industrial uses.

== See also ==
- Legality of cannabis by country
- Cannabis in India
