= Siemieniotka =

Silesian hemp seed soup

- Type: Soup
- Place of origin: Poland, Silesia
- Region or state: Silesia, Lesser Poland, Świętokrzyskie
- Main ingredients: Hemp seeds

Siemieniotka is a Silesian soup made of hemp seed, often eaten at the traditional Christmas Eve meal, Wigilia. The name of the dish comes from its main component, seeds (siemie).

The hemp seeds are cooked, separated from the shells, ground into paste and mixed with milk and honey (an alternative recipe in Polish).

== See also ==
- Bhang
- Spiritual use of cannabis
- Thandai
