= Cannabis in India =

- Location of India (dark green)
- Medicinal: Legal
- Recreational: Illegal
- Spiritual: Legal

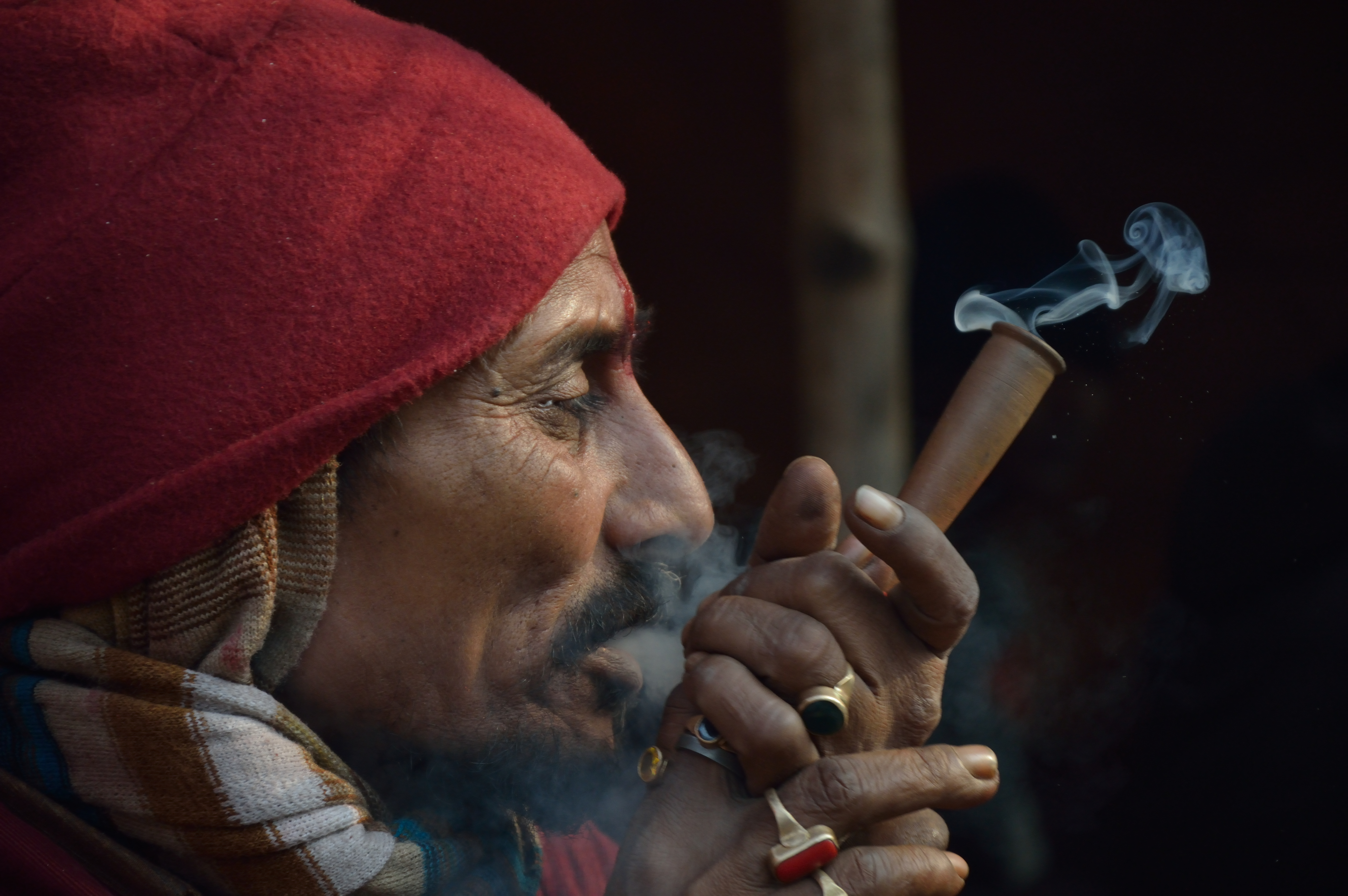
A man smoking cannabis in Kolkata, India

Cannabis in India has been thought to be used at least as early as 2000 BCE though linguistic evidence demonstrates that it may not have been used until the 11th century. In Indian society, common terms for cannabis preparations include charas (resin), ganja (flower), and bhang (seeds and leaves), with Indian drinks such as bhang lassi and bhang thandai made from bhang being one of the most common legal uses.

As of 2000, per the UNODC the "prevalence of usage" of cannabis in India was 3.2%. A 2019 study conducted by the All India Institutes of Medical Sciences reported that about 7.2 million Indians had consumed cannabis within the past year. The Ministry of Social Justice and Empowerment's "Magnitude of Substance Use in India 2019" survey found that 2.83% of Indians aged 10–75 years (or 31 million people) were current users of cannabis products. According to the UNODC's World Drug report 2016, the retail price of cannabis in India was US$0.10 per gram, the lowest of any country in the world. A study by the German data firm ABCD found that New Delhi and Mumbai were the third and sixth largest cannabis consuming cities in the world in 2018, consuming 38.2 tonnes and 32.4 tonnes of cannabis respectively .

== History ==
=== Antiquity ===
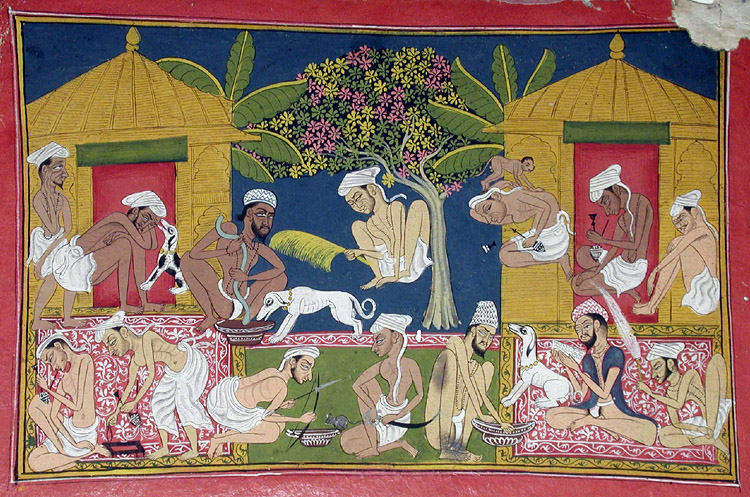
Bhang eaters from India c. 1790. Bhang is an edible preparation of cannabis native to the Indian subcontinent. It has been used in food and drink as early as 1000 BCE by Hindus in ancient India.

Bhanga is mentioned in several Indian texts dated before 1000 CE. However, there is philological debate among Sanskrit scholars as to whether this bhanga can be identified with modern bhang or cannabis.

Cannabis sativa is one of the candidates for the identity of the plant that was used to prepare soma in Vedic period. Soma was an intoxicating ritual drink that is highly praised in the Rigveda (c. 1700–1100 BCE).

Atharvaveda (c. 1500–1000 BCE) mentions bhanga as one of the five sacred plants that relieve anxiety. Sayana interpreted bhanga as a type of wild grass, but many scholars identify bhanga with cannabis. The relevant verse:

To the five kingdoms of the plants which Soma rules as Lord we speak.

darbha, hemp, barley, mighty power: may these deliver us from woe,

— Translated by Ralph T. H. Griffith, Atharva Veda 11.6.15

The five kingdoms of plants, having Soma as their chief, we address;

the darbha, hemp, barley, saha — let them free us from distress.

— Translated by William Dwight Whitney, Atharva Veda 11.6.15

Sushruta Samhita (c. 600 BCE) again mentions bhanga, as a medicinal plant, and recommends it for treating catarrh, phlegm and diarrhea.

According to Gerrit Jan Meulenbeld and Dominik Wujastyk, Chikitsa-sara-sangraha (c. late 11th century) by Vangasena is the earliest extant Indian text that features an uncontested mention of cannabis. It mentions bhanga as an appetiser and a digestive, and suggests it in two recipes for a long and happy life. Narayan Sarma's Dhanvantariya Nighantu, a contemporary text, mentions a narcotic of the plant. Nagarjuna's Yogaratnamala (c. 12th–13th century) suggests that cannabis (mdtuldni) smoke can be used to make one's enemies feel possessed by spirits. Sharngadhara Samhita (13th century) also gives medicinal uses of cannabis, and along with ahiphena (opium poppy), mentions it as one of the drugs which act very quickly in the body.

Cannabis also finds its mention in other historic scriptures like Dhanvantari Nighantu, Sarngandhara Samhita and Kayyadeva Nighantu. It is also referred in Ayurveda as an ingredient in various recipes of pain relievers and aphrodisiacs, but in small quantities. Ayurveda however does not use cannabis for smoking recipes.

The Hindu god Shiva is said to have chosen cannabis as his favorite food, after having spent one night sleeping under the plant's leaves and when eating of it in the morning refreshed him. Another legend suggests that when the poison Halahala came out from the Samudra manthan, Shiva drank it to protect everyone from it. Later, bhang was used to cool him down. Shiva Purana suggests offering bhang to Shiva during the summer months. But not all devotees offer bhang to Shiva.

Many Ayurvedic texts mention cannabis as vijaya, while tantric texts mention it as samvid. Cannabis is occasionally found in Indian alchemical (rasaśāstra) texts as one of the divine plants but rarely appears in alchemical medicines.

=== Colonial India ===
==== Portuguese India ====
Following the Portuguese seizure of Goa in 1510, the Portuguese became familiar with the cannabis customs and trade in India. Garcia de Orta, a botanist and doctor, wrote about the uses of cannabis in his 1534 work Colloquies on the Simples and Drugs and Medicinal Matters of India and of a Few Fruits. Garcia noted that bhang was used to improve work and appetite and enable labour, and "I believe that it is so generally used and by such a number of people that there is no mystery about it.” Fifteen years later Cristobal Acosta produced the work A Tract about the Drugs and Medicines of the East Indies, outlining recipes for bhang.

==== British India ====
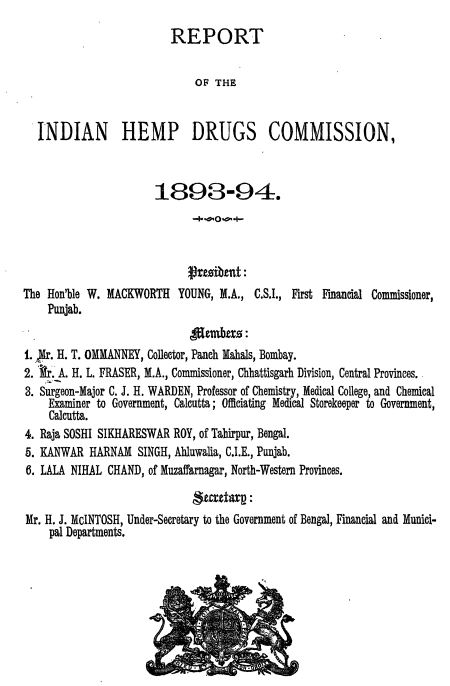
Indian Hemp Drugs Commission Report in 1893–94

The British Parliament enacted a tax on bhang, ganja and charas in 1798, stating that the tax was intended to reduce cannabis consumption "for the sake of the natives' good health and sanity". In 1894, the British Indian government completed a wide-ranging study of cannabis in India. The report's findings stated:

Viewing the subject generally, it may be added that the moderate use of these drugs is the rule, and that the excessive use is comparatively exceptional. The moderate use practically produces no ill effects. In all but the most exceptional cases, the injury from habitual moderate use is not appreciable. The excessive use may certainly be accepted as very injurious, though it must be admitted that in many excessive consumers the injury is not clearly marked. The injury done by the excessive use is, however, confined almost exclusively to the consumer himself; the effect on society is rarely appreciable. It has been the most striking feature in this inquiry to find how little the effects of hemp drugs have obtruded themselves on observation.

— Report of the Indian Hemp Drugs Commission, 1894-1895

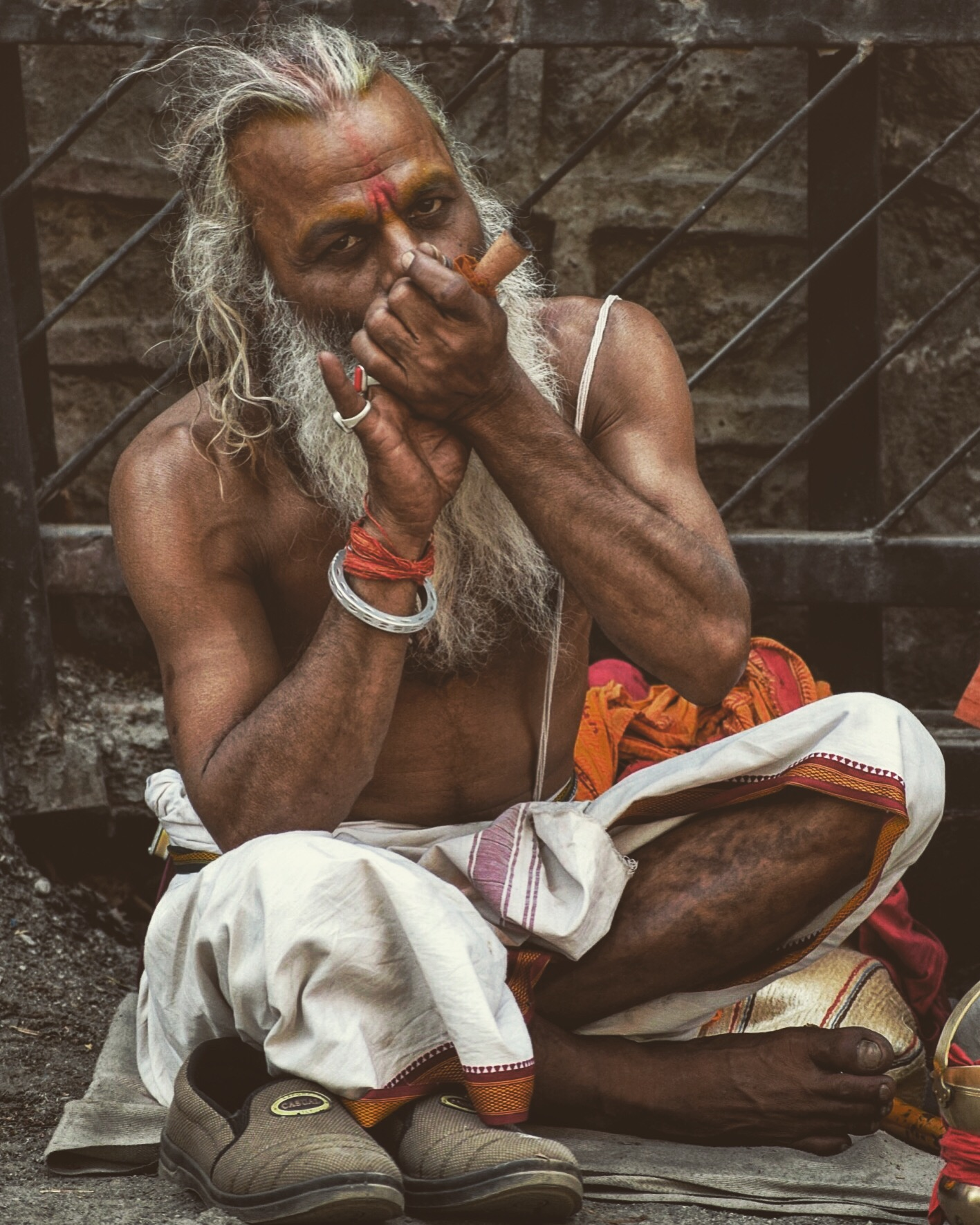
A sadhu smoking cannabis on the Hindu festival of Maha Shivaratri at the Kashi Vishwanath Temple

== Modern use ==
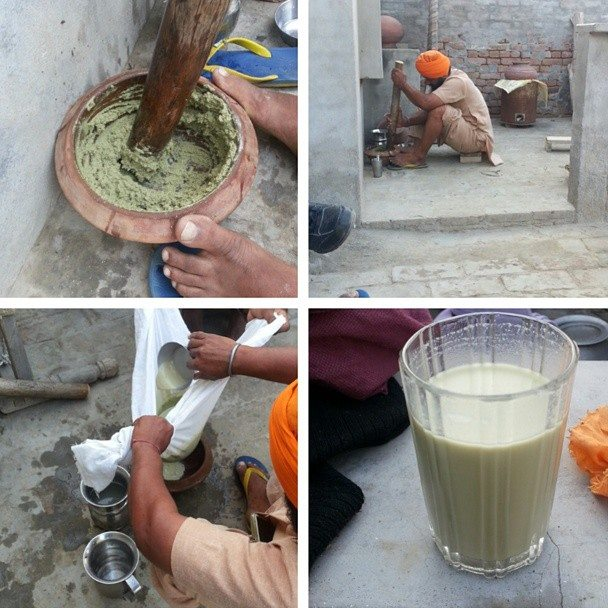
Process of making bhang in a Sikh village in Punjab, India. On the Hindu and Sikh festival of colours called Holi, it is a customary addition to some intoxicating drinks.

As bhang, cannabis is still popular in India. It is also mixed in thandai, a milkshake-like preparation. Bhang is consumed as prasad of Shiva, and is popular between Mahashivaratri and Holi (February–March). Among Sikh Nihangs, bhang is popular, especially during Hola Mohalla. Muslim Indian Sufis place the spirit of Khidr within the cannabis plant, and consume bhang.

Even in Assam, where cannabis has been explicitly banned since 1958, it is consumed by thousands during the Ambubachi Mela. In 2015, the police did not stop devotees from consuming bhang, although they fined two people for smoking tobacco in public places, under the Cigarettes and Other Tobacco Products Act.

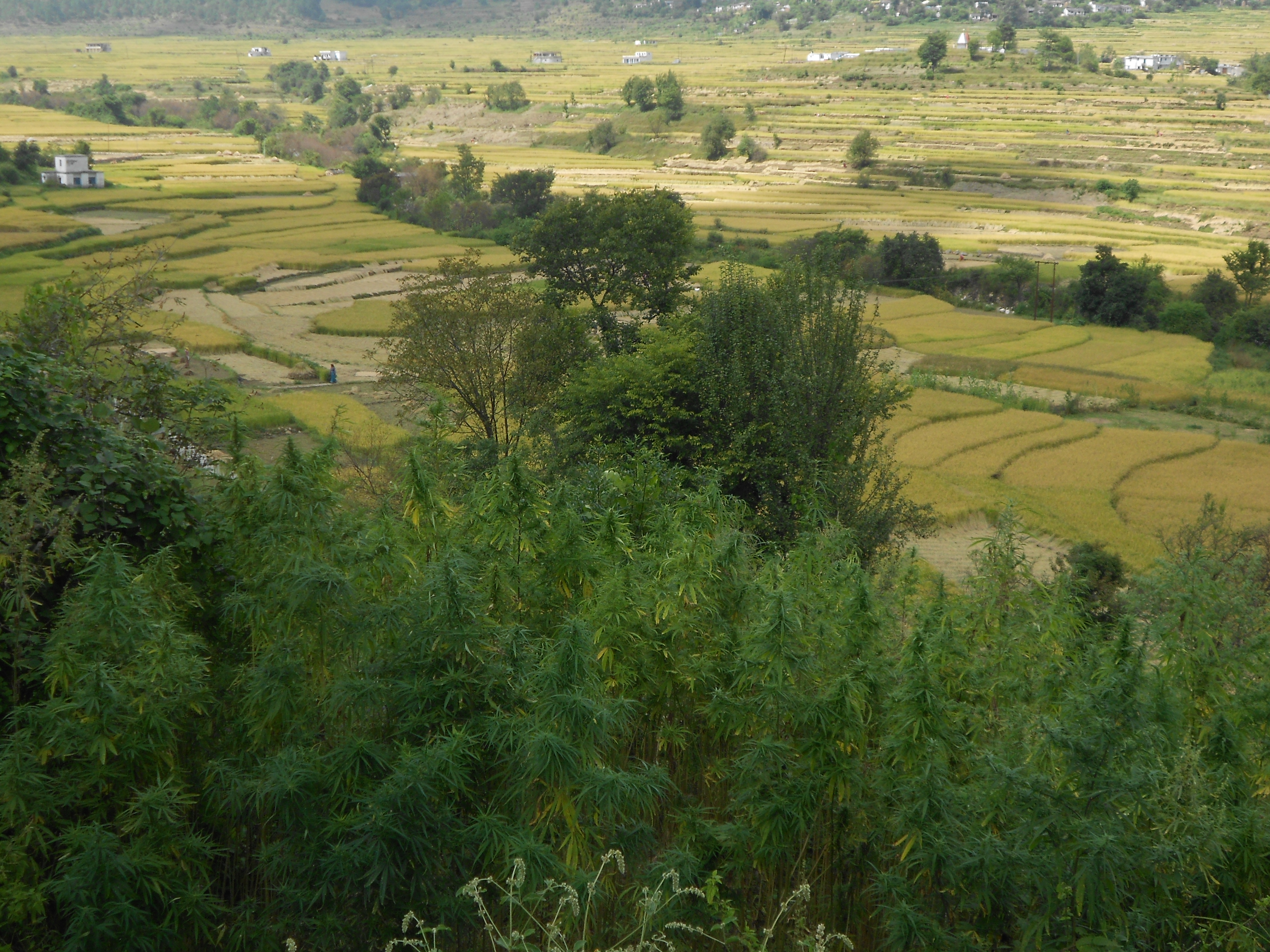
Wild cannabis in Uttarakhand

In November 2015, Uttarakhand legalized the cultivation of cannabis for industrial purposes. Patanjali Ayurved CEO Balkrishna stated in February 2018 that his company had begun researching the benefits of cannabis and its extracts at its research and development facility in Haridwar, for use in the company's medicines and other products. Madhya Pradesh's Law Minister, P.C. Sharma stated on 20 November 2019 that the state was considering legalising the cultivation of cannabis for medical and industrial purposes. Manipur Chief Minister N. Biren Singh informed the State Assembly on 21 February 2020 that his government was considering legalising the cultivation of cannabis for medical and industrial purposes.

Indian law enforcement agencies seized a total of 182,622 kg of ganja and 2,489 kg of hashish in 2016. Enforcement agencies eradicated 1,980 hectares of illicit cannabis cultivation in 2018, lower than the 3,446 hectares eradicated in 2017. The International Narcotics Control Board's 2019 annual report noted that "India is among those countries worldwide with the greatest extent of illicit cannabis cultivation and production.

The Ministry of Social Justice and Empowerment's "Magnitude of Substance Use in India 2019" survey found that 2.83% of Indians aged 10–75 years (or 31 million people) were current users of cannabis products, with 10% of the population considered to be using cannabis "in a dependent pattern". The survey found that 20% of the population consumed bhang and 12%% consumed charas or ganja. It also noted that most cannabis users were male with 25% of the male population consuming cannabis and 10% of the female population. The survey found that cannabis use was most prevalent in Sikkim, where 7.3% of the population reported using cannabis, followed by Nagaland (4.7%), Odisha (4.7%) Arunachal Pradesh (4.2%) and Delhi (3.8%). The lowest cannabis use was reported in Puducherry, Kerala, Rajasthan, Tamil Nadu, Lakshadweep, Dadra and Nagar Haveli, Gujarat and the Andaman and Nicobar Islands, all of which recorded about 0.1% of the population as having used cannabis.

A study by the German data firm ABCD found that New Delhi and Mumbai were the third and sixth largest cannabis consuming cities in the world in 2018, consuming 38.2 tonnes and 32.4 tonnes of cannabis respectively.

There is some evidence that Naxalites are invested in illegal production of Cannabis in some parts of India.

== Legal status ==
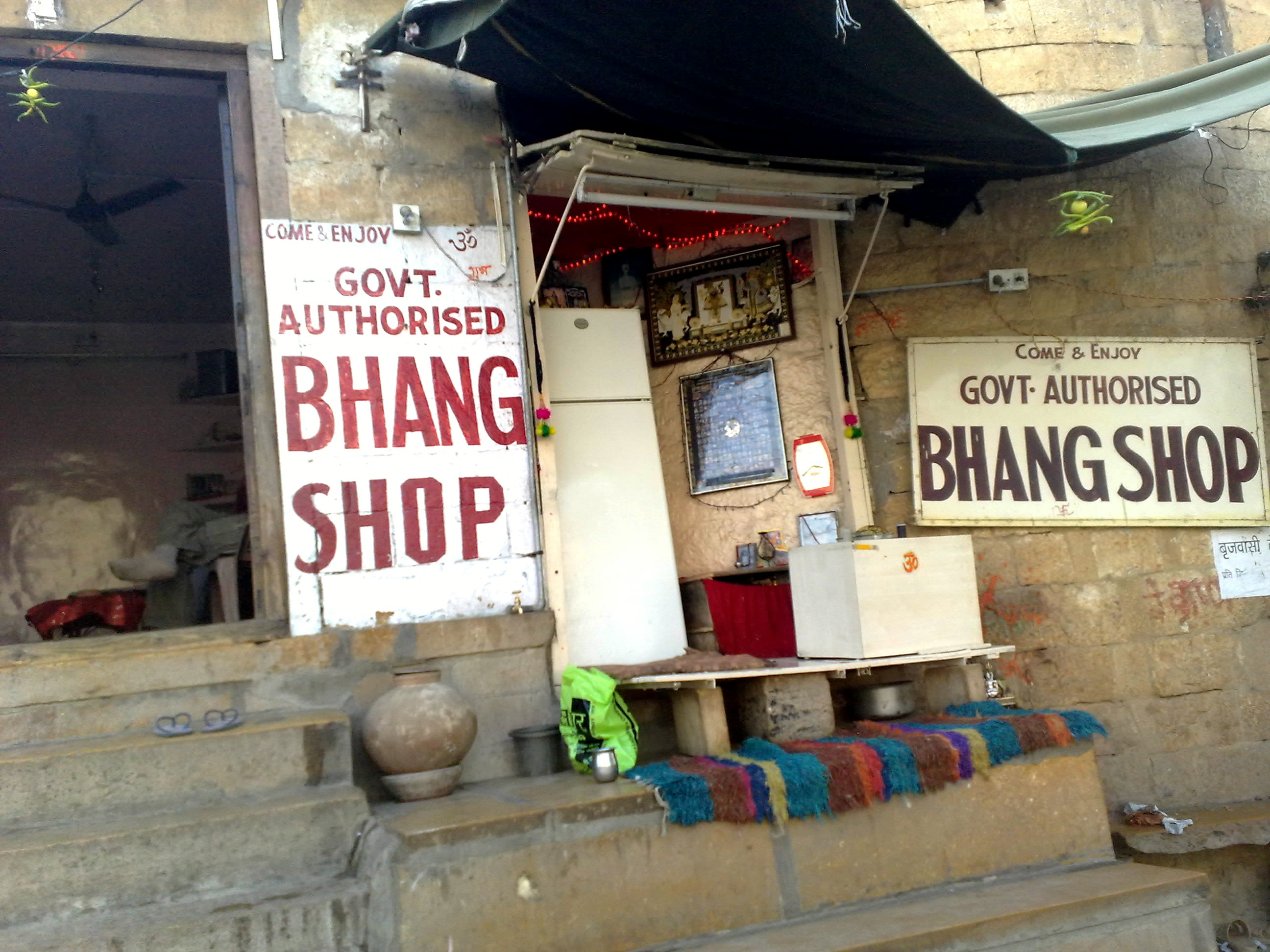
In most states, only government-authorised dealers are allowed to sell bhang.

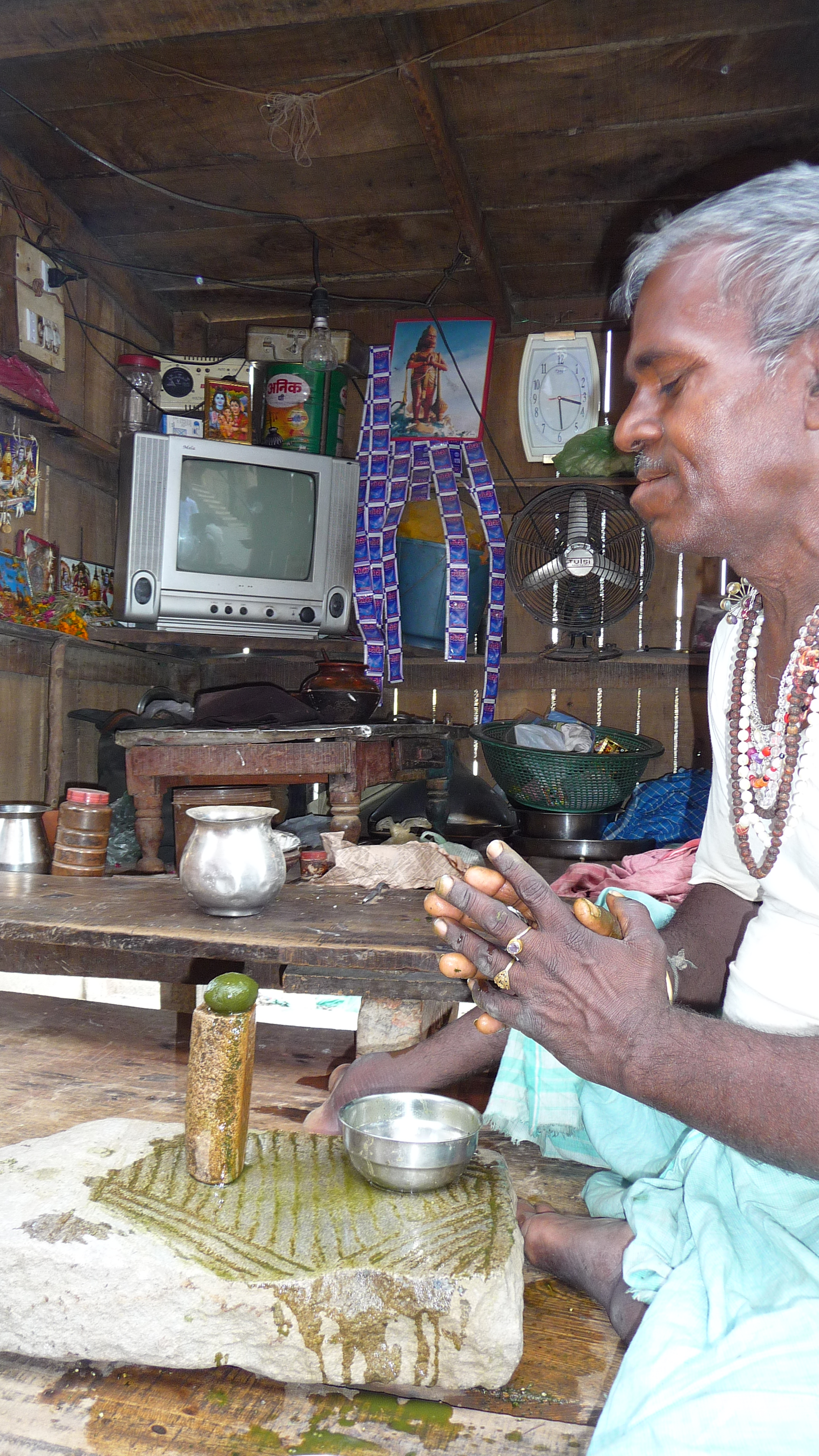
Bhang seller in Varanasi

Cannabis remains illegal in India under the Narcotic Drugs and Psychotropic Substances Act, 1985, with certain exceptions for medical use, scientific research, and traditional preparations like bhang. Attempts at criminalising cannabis in British India were made, and mooted, in 1838, 1871, and 1877.

The 1961 international treaty Single Convention on Narcotic Drugs classed cannabis with hard drugs. During the negotiations, the Indian delegation opposed its intolerance to the social and religious customs of India. As a compromise, the Indian Government promised to limit the export of Indian hemp, and the final draft of the treaty defined cannabis as:

"Cannabis" means the flowering or fruiting tops of the cannabis plant (excluding the seeds and leaves when not accompanied by the tops) from which the resin has not been extracted, by whatever name they may be designated.

— Commentary on the Single Convention on Narcotic Drugs, 1961: Paragraph I, subparagrah (b).Commentary on the Single Convention on Narcotic Drugs, 1961

Bhang, which is prepared from leaves, was thus left out from the definition of "cannabis". This allowed India to carry on the tradition of large-scale consumption of bhang during Holi. The treaty also gave India 25 years to clamp down on recreational drugs. Towards the end of this exemption period, the Indian government passed the Narcotic Drugs and Psychotropic Substances Act in 1985.

The NDPS maintained the same definition of "cannabis", excluding bhang from its purview:

"cannabis (hemp)" means:

1. charas, that is, the separated resin, in whatever form, whether crude or purified, obtained from the cannabis plant and also includes concentrated preparation and resin known as hashish oil or liquid hashish;
2. ganja, that is, the flowering or fruiting tops of the cannabis plant (excluding the seeds and leaves when not accompanied by the tops), by whatever name they may be known or designated; and
3. any mixture, with or without any neutral material, of any of the above forms of cannabis or any drink prepared therefrom;

— Narcotic Drugs and Psychotropic Substances Act (India), Chapter I, Section 2.iii.

NDPS banned the production and sale of cannabis resin and flowers, but permitted the use of the leaves and seeds, allowing the states to regulate the latter.

The NDPS Act doesn't mention anything about smoking paraphernalia, making it completely legal to buy or sell smoking accessories like rolling papers, smoking pipes, and more.

Cultivation of cannabis for industrial purposes such as making industrial hemp or for horticultural use is legal in India. The National Policy on Narcotic Drugs and Psychotropic Substances recognizes cannabis as a source of biomass, fiber, and high-value oil. The Government of India encourages the research and cultivation of cannabis with low THC content.

Indian government is strict with the Cannabis policy. According to Section 20 of the NDPS Act, holding a small quantity of weed can land you in jail for rigorous imprisonment of up to six months or a fine of Rs. 10,000 or both.

=== Regional laws on cannabis ===
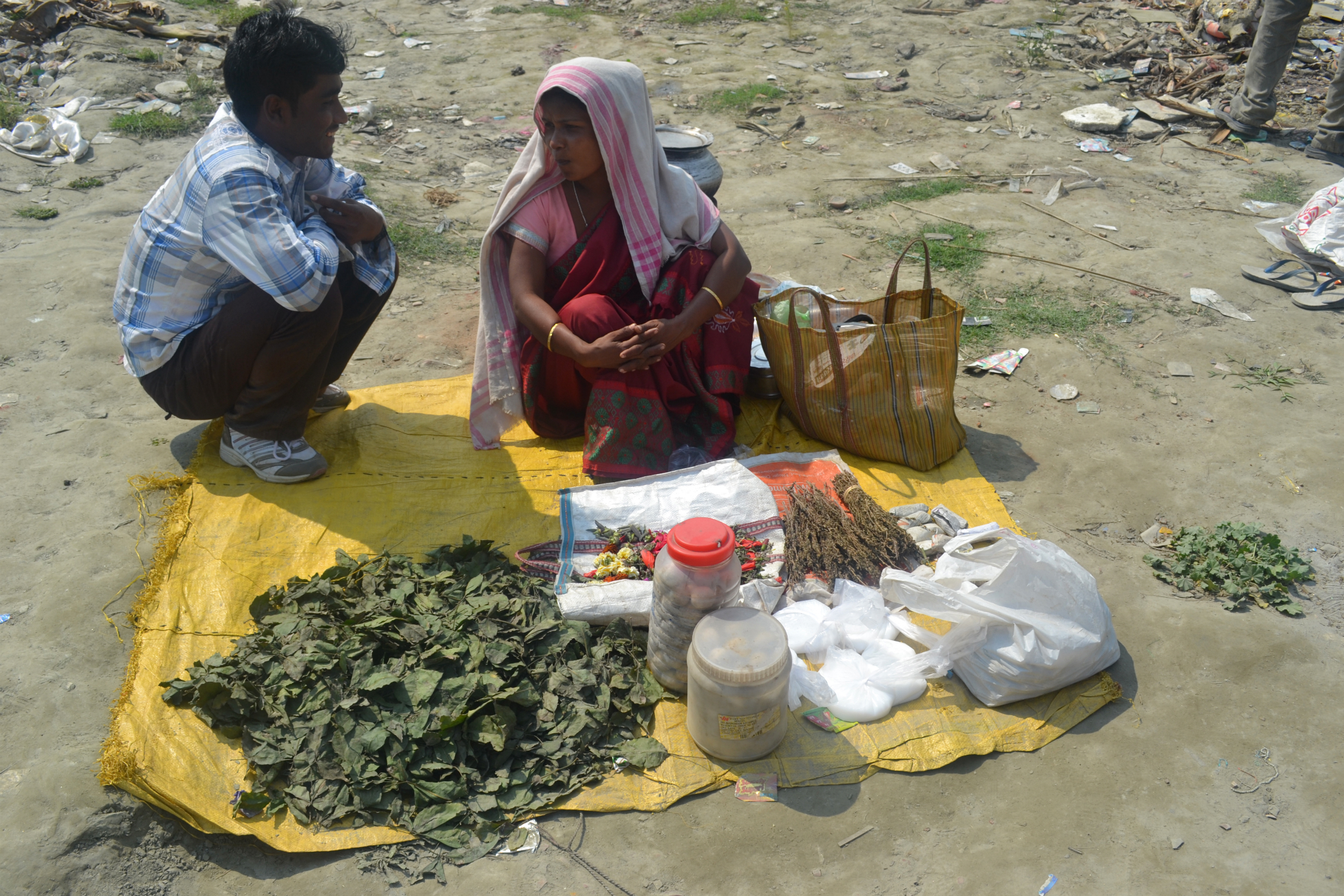
A woman sells bhang in Assam, where it is banned since 1958

Although NDPS allows consumption of bhang, various states have their own laws banning or restricting its use. In some states, only authorised dealers are allowed to sell bhang. Some states also have rules about the maximum amount of bhang one person can carry and the minimum age of the buyer.

In Assam, The Assam Ganja and Bhang Prohibition Act, 1958, prohibits sale, purchase, possession and consumption of ganja and bhang.

In Maharashtra, Section 66(1)(b) of the Bombay Prohibition (BP) Act, 1949, bans manufacture, possession and consumption of bhang and bhang-containing substances without a license.

On 21 February 2017, Gujarat legalized bhang by removing it from the list of "intoxicating drugs" covered by section 23 of the Gujarat Prohibition Act. Gujarat's Minister of State for Home and Prohibition, Pradipsinh Jadeja, explained, "Bhang is consumed only as prasad of Lord Shiva. The state government has received complaints of misuse of prohibition act against those found drinking bhang. Hence, keeping in view the sentiments of public at large, the government has decided to exempt bhang from the ambit of Gujarat Prohibition Amendment Act. Bhang is less intoxicating as compared to ganja."

== Reform ==
In 2015, the first organised efforts to re-legalise cannabis in India appeared, with the holding of medical marijuana conferences in Bengaluru, Pune, Mumbai and Delhi by the Great Legalisation Movement India. Many articles and programs in the popular media have also begun to appear pushing for a change in cannabis laws.

In March 2015, Lok Sabha MP for Dhenkanal Tathagata Satpathy stated on a Reddit AMA that he supported the legalisation of cannabis, and also admitted to having consumed the drug on several occasions when he was in college. He later repeated his comments on television and during interactions with the media. On 2 November 2016, Lok Sabha MP Dharamvir Gandhi announced that he had received clearance from Parliament to table a Private Member's Bill seeking to amend the NDPS Act to allow for the legalised, regulated, and medically supervised supply of "non-synthetic" intoxicants including cannabis and opium.

In July 2017, Union Minister of Women and Child Development Maneka Gandhi suggested the legalization of medical marijuana on the grounds that it would reduce drug abuse and aid cancer patients at the second meeting of the group of ministers to examine the draft Cabinet note for the National Drug Demand Reduction Policy. About a week after the minister's statement, the Union Government issued the first-ever licence to grow cannabis for research purposes to the Council of Scientific and Industrial Research (CSIR), in collaboration with the Bombay Hemp Company (BOHECO).

On 12 December 2017, Viki Vaurora, the founder of the Great Legalisation Movement India, penned an open letter to Prime Minister Narendra Modi and all members of Parliament advocating the urgent need to legalise the cultivation of cannabis and hemp for medical and industrial use. In February 2018, the Prime Minister's Office sent a notification to the Ministry of Health and Family Welfare directing the ministry to examine the potential benefits associated with cannabis and issue a response to the letter.

On 5 June 2018, Lok Sabha MP from Thiruvananthapuram Shashi Tharoor wrote an opinion piece expressing support for the legalization of cannabis, and concluding that it was "high time for India to embrace the health, business, and broader societal benefits that legally regulating cannabis can bring".

In July 2019, the Delhi High Court agreed to hear a petition, filed by the Great Legalisation Movement Trust, challenging the ban on cannabis. The public interest litigation argues that grouping cannabis with other chemical drugs under the NDPS Act is "arbitrary, unscientific and unreasonable".

India voted in favour of removing cannabis and cannabis resin from Schedule IV of the 1961 Single Convention on Narcotic Drugs at the United Nations Commission on Narcotic Drugs (CND) on 9 December 2020. The resolution was passed with 27 member countries voting in favour, 25 against, and one abstention.

The Indian Express published an editorial on 7 December 2020 supporting the legalisation of cannabis, and calling for it to be regulated and taxed like alcohol and tobacco products.

In March 2021, the Chief Minister of Himachal Pradesh, Jai Ram Thakur, said that the state government is coming up with a policy to allow controlled cultivation of hemp or cannabis in the state. The motivation behind this change is reported to be to boost the local economy of Himachal Pradesh.

In March 2021, The State Government of Tripura announced it would form an expert panel to examine the viability of legalizing cannabis cultivation.

“There is a limited scope of revenue collection in Tripura. We have to depend on the central government due to this. The soil of Tripura is very fertile for cannabis cultivation but since it is not legal, many people are suffering financially here. If ganja becomes legal, it can be regulated, revenue can be collected and many people involved in cultivating it, illegally till now, can benefit financially”. - BJP MLA Diba Chandra Hrangkhawl.

In August 2022, the Karnataka High Court in a notable judgement ruled that Bhang, is not prohibited under the NDPS Act of 1985.

== Medical research ==
The first medical cannabis clinic in India was opened in Koramangala, Bengaluru on 1 February 2020.

== In popular culture ==
=== In film ===
Cannabis has often been depicted in Indian cinema. Historically, Hindi films have portrayed cannabis use negatively depicting the drug as being associated with an upper class hippie culture or as an intoxicating substance used by criminals. On the other hand, consumption of bhang was often celebrated in popular film songs such as Jai Jai Shiv Shankar and Khaike Paan Banaraswala and the famous track Manali trance. The negative portrayals of cannabis began to undergo a change from the 2000s. Films such as Shaitan (2011), Luv Shuv Tey Chicken Khurana (2012), Kapoor & Sons and The Blueberry Hunt (2016) feature urban middle-class protagonists using cannabis as form of relaxation. Go Goa Gone (2013) was described as the first Hindi-language stoner comedy. Bejoy Nambiar, who wrote and directed Shaitan, believes that "there's a culture of smoking up among today's youth and it's becoming more and more relevant in our movies." Akshay Kumar smoked casually in the movie Good Newwz (2019), his highest-grossing film. Some movies such as Gully Boy (2019) touch upon the illicit trade of Cannabis in Mumbai.
