= Majoun =

Moroccan confection

Majoun or ma'jun (Arabic: معجون, pronounced [mæʕˈʒuːn, -ˈɡuːn], lit. 'kneaded, paste') is a Moroccan confection, which can resemble a pastry ball, fudge, or jam. Ingredients can include honey, nuts, and dried fruits, and the treat is commonly made as a cannabis edible, sometimes in combination with other drugs. A 1957 report describes majun as containing "hemp, opium and seeds of datura".

== See also ==
- Bhang
- Boza
- Spiritual use of cannabis
- Thandai
