= Cannabis use and trauma =

Trauma contributed to promoting the use and potential abuse of cannabis. Conversely, cannabis use has been associated with the intensity of trauma and PTSD symptoms. While evidence of efficacious use of cannabis is growing in novelty, it is not currently recommended.

== Frequency and intensity of symptoms ==
Individuals who have traumatic experiences have been found to have increased overall cannabis use and higher instances of cannabis use disorder (CUD), suggestive of problematic cannabis use. For example, veterans who identify as medicinal users have been shown to have a higher association with combat exposure, trauma related symptoms, and arousal when cued to situations, as well as overall cannabis use.

Despite increased cannabis use in those with PTSD symptoms, a National Epidemiological Study with thousands of participants based in the United States indicated lifetime PTSD was a weak predictor of lifetime cannabis use. However, this study affirmed that for individuals who endorse cannabis use and trauma exposure, they are likely to have concurrent PTSD and CUD symptoms. The strength of the association between heavy PTSD symptoms and CUD was stronger than that of CUD and other psychiatric disorders, namely depression, generalized anxiety disorder, social anxiety disorder, panic disorder, alcohol use disorder, and personality disorders. It is worth noting that this was done with older DSM-IV criteria, rather than the most current DSM-5, suggestive of possible shifts in diagnostic criteria used to gauge psychological and substance-related disorders.

== Trauma as a motive ==
High use of cannabis has been associated with coping motives in medicinal cannabis users with PTSD symptoms. In a longitudinal study of American female twins, trauma and psychological symptoms were significant predictors for cannabis initiation and cannabis use disorder (CUD). Individuals with higher levels of life-threatening events, injury, or experiences of death were also more likely to initiate cannabis use during the emerging adulthood phase, with sexual abuse predicting cannabis use initiation before the age of 15 in African American women. In European-American women, sexual and physical abuse, as well as major depressive disorder (MDD), predicted age of cannabis initiation, with development of a CUD being predicting more specifically by MDD and physical abuse. Those with sexual trauma who initiate cannabis use prior to the age of 16, are also more likely to develop psychosis.

In women military veterans, a higher proportion of cannabis users who had experienced childhood and adult sexual trauma, had higher levels of PTSD when compared to those with no drug use. When controlling for PTSD symptoms and demographic factors, regular cannabis use was still significantly related to sexual trauma. For sexual minority women, have indicated higher cannabis use, coping motives, and PTSD symptoms than heterosexual women. This may suggest that for women, trauma symptoms may be more severe for those who belong to a minority status, and the necessity to cope is often met by increasing cannabis use. These findings corroborate the idea that increased cannabis use can also be driven by minority stress, which has also been related to increased trauma.

== Viability and use of cannabis as treatment ==
=== Emotion regulation and anxiety symptoms ===
==== Tetrahydrocannabinol ====
The psychoactive component of cannabis, tetrahydrocannabinol (THC) is not effective in treating emotion-regulation and anxiety-related symptoms. Conversely, THC has been empirically related to an increase in anxiety symptoms through impacts on neurological areas impacting serotonin, noradrenaline, GABA, and glutamate.

==== Cannabidiol ====
When using cannabidiol (CBD) results have indicated a weakened emotional response to traumatic memories. This effect is attributed to the presence of cannabinoid receptors in the limbic system, including the amygdala and the hypothalamus, that CBD may impact. These components' effect likely leads to the reduction of neuroendocrine and behavioral stress responses. Altogether, a cumulation of research indicates cannabinoids can help with fear extinction and combating depression. However, further studies are needed to validate the therapeutic potential of cannabinoids for emotional dysregulation and anxiety symptoms associated with trauma.

=== Sleep ===
==== Tetrahydrocannabinol ====
While the psychoactive component THC, has been shown to reduce time to get to sleep, studies indicate disrupted circadian rhythms when using THC. Furthermore, THC is shown to have a quicker development of tolerance to sleep-inducing effects. It is worth noting that synthetic THC has also shown the same effects of developed tolerance to sleep latency effects.

However, individuals diagnosed with high PTSD scores have endorsed the use of medical cannabis for sleeping. Studies have found some evidence for using Naboline, a synthetic version of THC, has proven effective for decreasing the frequency of PTSD related nightmares without developing long-term tolerance.

==== Cannabidiol ====
Novel research into cannabis suggests potential therapeutic effects of cannabinoids, specifically with higher doses of CBD, as opposed to lower doses, which can have an energizing effect. In laboratory studies with rats, CBD has been shown to reduce sleep latency due to anxiety in REM sleep, with no negative changes to other aspects of sleep.
