= Narcotic Drugs and Psychotropic Substances Act, 1985 =

Indian act of parliament

Parliament of India
- Long title: An Act to consolidate and amend the law relating to narcotic drugs, to make stringent provisions for the control and regulation of operations relating to narcotic drugs and psychotropic substances, to provide for the forfeiture of property derived from, or used in, illicit traffic in narcotic drugs and psychotropic substances, to implement the provisions of the International Convention on Narcotic Drugs and Psychotropic Substances and for matters connected therewith
- Citation: Act No. 61 of 1985
- Territorial extent: India
- Assented to: 16 September 1985
- Commenced: 14 November 1985

Legislative history
- Bill title: The Narcotic Drugs and Psychotropic Substances Bill, 1985
- Introduced: 23 August 1985

Amended by
- 1988, 2001, 2014 and 2021

Related legislation
- Prevention of Illicit Trafficking in Narcotic Drugs and Psychotropic Substances Act, 1988
- Status: Amended

The Narcotic Drugs and Psychotropic Substances Act, 1985, commonly referred to as the NDPS Act, is an Act of the Parliament of India that prohibits the production/manufacturing/cultivation, possession, sale, purchase, transport, storage, and/or consumption of any narcotic drug or psychotropic substance. The bill was introduced in the Lok Sabha on 23 August 1985. It was passed by both the Houses of Parliament, received assent from then President Giani Zail Singh on September 16 1985, and came into force on 14 November 1985. The NDPS Act has since been amended four times — in 1988, 2001, 2014 and 2021. The Act extends to the whole of India and applies also to all Indian citizens outside India and to all persons on ships and aircraft registered in India.

The Narcotics Control Bureau was set up under the act with effect from March 1986. The Act is designed to fulfill India's treaty obligations under the Single Convention on Narcotic Drugs, Convention on Psychotropic Substances, and United Nations Convention Against Illicit Traffic in Narcotic Drugs and Psychotropic Substances.There are 6 Chapters and 83 Sections in NDPS Act 1985.

== Drug Control legislation ==
India had no legislation regarding narcotics until 1985. Cannabis smoking in India has been known since at least 2000 BC and is first mentioned in the Atharvaveda, which dates back a few thousands years BC. The Indian Hemp Drugs Commission, an Indo-British study of cannabis usage in India appointed in 1893, found that the "moderate" use of hemp drugs was "practically attended by no evil results at all", "produces no injurious effects on the mind" and "no moral injury whatever". Regarding "excessive" use of the drug, the Commission concluded that it "may certainly be accepted as very injurious, though it must be admitted that in many excessive consumers the injury is not clearly marked". The report the Commission produced was at least 3,281 pages long, with testimony from almost 1,200 "doctors, coolies, yogis, fakirs, heads of lunatic asylums, bhang peasants, tax gatherers, smugglers, army officers, hemp dealers, ganja palace operators and the clergy."

Cannabis and its derivatives (marijuana, hashish/charas and bhang) were legally sold in India until 1985, and their recreational use was commonplace. Consumption of cannabis was not seen as socially deviant behaviour, and was viewed as being similar to the consumption of alcohol. Ganja and charas were considered by upper class Indians as the poor man's intoxicant, although the rich consumed bhang during Holi. The United States began to campaign for a worldwide law against all drugs, following the adoption of the Single Convention on Narcotic Drugs in 1961. However, India opposed the move, and withstood American pressure to make cannabis illegal for nearly 25 years. American pressure increased in the 1980s, and in 1985, the Rajiv Gandhi government succumbed and enacted the NDPS Act, banning all narcotic drugs in India.

== Punishment ==
Anyone who contravenes the NDPS Act will face punishment based on the quantity of the banned substance.

- where the contravention involves a small quantity, with rigorous imprisonment for a term which may extend to 1 year, or with a fine which may extend to ₹10,000 (US$100) or both;
- where the contravention involves a quantity lesser than commercial quantity but greater than a small quantity, with rigorous imprisonment for a term which may extend to 10 years and with fine which may extend to ₹1 lakh (US$1,000);
- where the contravention involves a commercial quantity, with rigorous imprisonment for a term which shall not be less than 10 years but which may extend to 20 years and also a fine which shall not be less than ₹1 lakh (US$1,000) but which may extend to ₹2 lakh (US$2,100).

The table below lists the current definition of a small quantity and a commercial quantity for some drugs.

Drug	Small quantity	Commercial quantity
Amphetamine	2 grams (0.071 oz)	50 grams (1.8 oz)
Charas	100 grams (3.5 oz)	1 kilogram (2.2 lb)
Cocaine	2 grams (0.071 oz)	100 grams (3.5 oz)
Ganja(Marijuana)	1 kilogram (2.2 lb)	20 kilograms (44 lb)
Heroin	5 grams (0.18 oz)	250 grams (8.8 oz)
LSD	2 milligrams (0.031 gr)	100 milligrams (1.5 gr)
Methadone	2 grams (0.071 oz)	50 grams (1.8 oz)
Morphine	5 grams (0.18 oz)	250 grams (8.8 oz)
Opium	25 grams (0.88 oz)	2.5 kilograms (5.5 lb)

== Criticism ==
Critics of the NDPS Act say that the restriction that the act places is "draconian" and the conditions for the grant of bail "amount to virtual denial and ensure years of incarceration". Critics say that the conditions of bail under this act are needlessly harsh and are similar to provisions of the Terrorist and Disruptive Activities (Prevention) Act, 1987 and Prevention of Terrorism Act, 2002 which result in long periods of imprisonment and that the NDPS act places the burden-of-proof entirely on the accused to establish innocence. Furthermore, some critics point out that under this act, there is a presumption of "culpable mental state", that is, the court will presume that there was an intention to commit a crime. They claim that this goes against the general principle of the law where people accused of a crime are assumed to be innocent until proven guilty.

There is a higher threshold for bail in serious cases under the Act. Under Section 37 of the NDPS Act, if a person is accused of an offence involving "commercial quantities", that is, more than 1 kg in case of hashish, and serious offences such as financing illicit traffic and harbouring offenders, then bail can only be granted if "the court is satisfied that there are reasonable grounds for believing that he is not guilty of such offence and that he is not likely to commit any offence while on bail".

During the discussion of the Bill in Parliament, several members opposed it for treating hard and soft drugs as the same. However, the Rajiv Gandhi administration claimed that soft drugs were gateway drugs.

The NDPS Act was criticized in The Times of India. The paper described the law as "ill-conceived" and "poorly thought-out" due to the law providing the same punishment for all drugs, which meant that dealers shifted their focus to harder drugs, where profits are far higher. The paper also argued that the Act had "actually created a drugs problem where there was none." The Times of India recommended that some of the softer drugs should be legalized, as this might reduce the level of heroin addiction.

In 2015, Lok Sabha MP Tathagata Satpathy criticized the ban on cannabis as "elitist", and labeling cannabis the "intoxicant" of the poor. He also felt that the ban was "an overreaction to a scare created by the United States". Sathpathy has also advocated the legalisation of cannabis. On 2 November 2015, Lok Sabha MP Dharamvir Gandhi announced that he had received clearance from Parliament to table a Private Member's Bill seeking to amend the NDPS Act to allow for the legalised, regulated, and medically supervised supply of "non-synthetic" intoxicants including cannabis and opium.

In November 2016, former commissioner of the Central Bureau of Narcotics Romesh Bhattacharji said of the law, "This needs to be debated in the face of such stiff ignorance which often takes root in the moral high grounds people take after being influenced by the UN conventions. This law [NDPS Act] has been victimising people since 1985".

== 1988 amendment ==
The Narcotic Drugs and Psychotropic Substances (Amendment) Act, 1988 (Act No. 2 of 1989) received assent from then President Ramaswamy Venkataraman on 8 January 1989.

== 2001 amendment ==
The Narcotic Drugs and Psychotropic Substances (Amendment) Act, 2001 (Act No. 9 of 2001) received assent from then President K. R. Narayanan on 9 May 2001.

== 2014 amendment ==
The Narcotic Drugs and Psychotropic Substances (Amendment) Act, 2014 (Act No. 16 of 2014) amended the NDPS Act to relax restrictions placed by the Act on Essential Narcotic Drugs (Morphine, Fentanyl and Methadone), making them more accessible for use in pain relief and palliative care. The Amendment also contained measures to improve treatment and care for people dependent on drugs, opened up the processing of opium and concentrated poppy straw to the private sector, and strengthened provisions related to the forfeiture of property of persons arraigned on charges of drug trafficking. The Amendment also removed the NDPS Act's imposition of a mandatory death sentence in case of a repeat conviction for trafficking large quantities of drugs, giving courts the discretion to use the alternative sentence of 30 years imprisonment for repeat offences. However, the Amendment increased the punishment for "small quantity" offences from a maximum of 6 months to 1 year imprisonment.

=== Proposal and enactment ===
The Narcotic Drugs and Psychotropic Substances (Amendment) Bill, 2011 (Bill No. 78 of 2011) was introduced in the Lok Sabha on 8 September 2011 by then Minister of Finance Pranab Mukherjee. The Bill was referred to the Standing Committee on Finance, chaired by Yashwant Sinha, on 13 September. The committee was scheduled to submit its report within three months, but actually submitted it on 21 March 2012. The Bill was passed by the Lok Sabha on 20 February 2014, and by the Rajya Sabha the next day. It received the assent of then President Pranab Mukherjee on 7 March 2014, and was published in The Gazette of India on 10 March.

== 2021 amendments ==
=== Proposed changes ===
Currently, under Section 27 of the NDPS Act, possession of small quantities for personal consumption of drugs is a punishable offence, and can attract a fine of ₹10,000 and imprisonment of six months or both. The Union Ministry of Social Justice and Empowerment has recommended decriminalizing of possession of small quantities of drugs for personal use. The ministry suggested that the NDPS Act be amended to treat the consumer of drugs as victims who ought to be referred for rehabilitation and de-addiction, and not as criminals to be sentenced to jail.

On 10 November 2021, a high-level meeting of all key stakeholders was held where a consensus was reached to do away with imprisonment and fines for personal consumption of drugs and amend Section 27 of the NDPS Act, and the possibility of rehabilitation and deaddiction programs of 30 days for drug users was discussed. The proposal under discussion sought to replace the word "consumption" with "other than personal consumption (in small quantity)" and also sought to replace the word "addict" with "person with substance use disorder". The reason for this change was to help the courts take a more lenient view on people caught with small quantities, and to more strongly emphasize the difference between possession of drugs for personal consumption and possession of drugs for commercial use. Advocates of the proposal state that drug decriminalization is an important step towards achieving a rational drug policy that puts science and public health before punishment and incarceration. The proposal also suggests that mandatory treatment for de-addiction for 30 days for any person who has been found to have consumed or be in possession to consume drugs.

== See also ==
- Cannabis in India
- Drug policy of India
