= Bhang =

Indian edible cannabis preparation

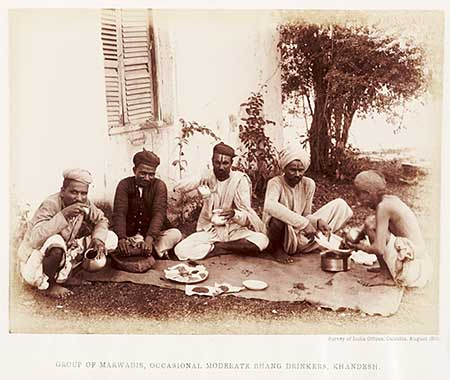
Photo of bhang drinkers, from the Indian Hemp Drugs Commission report, 1893

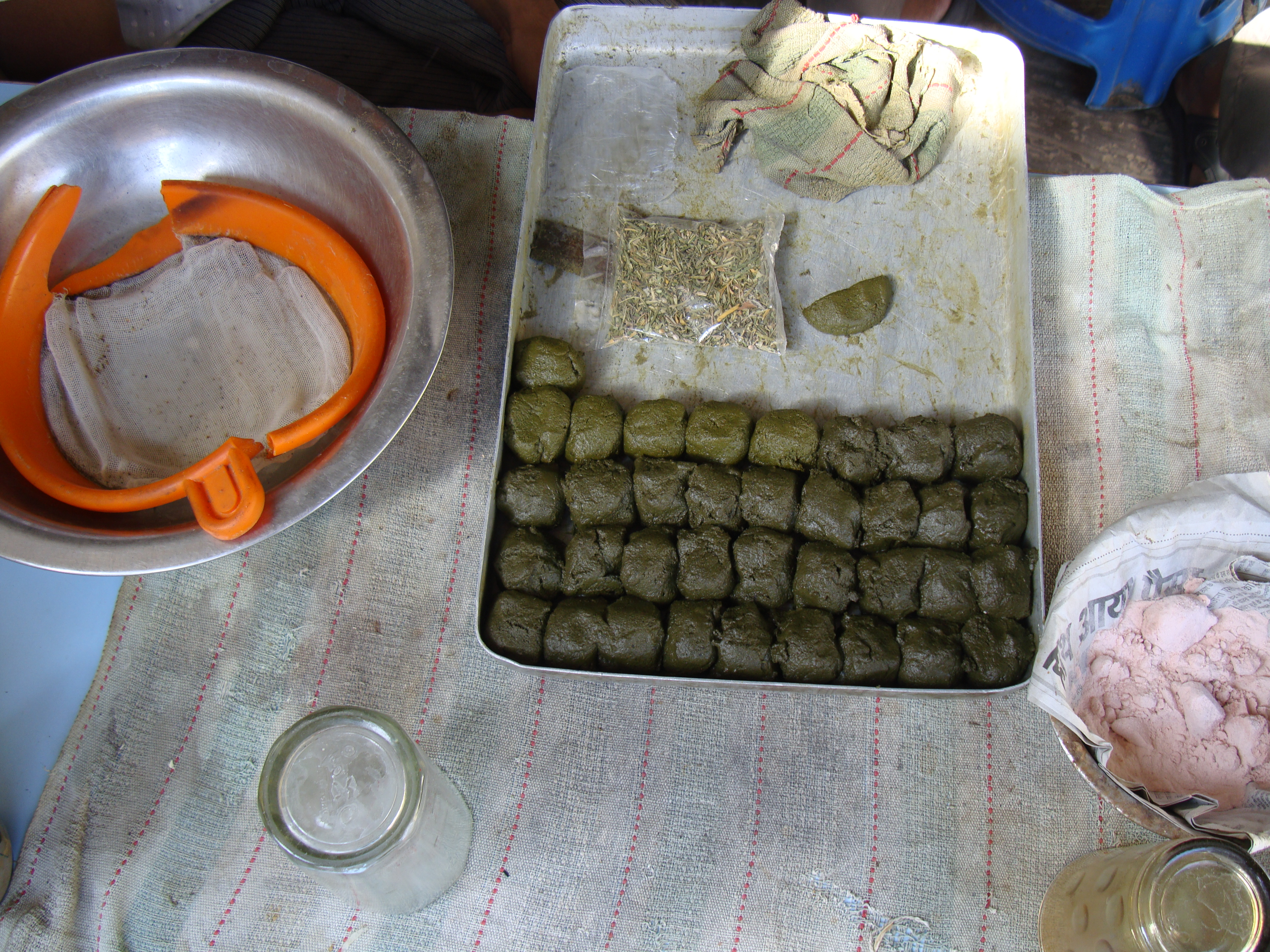
Bhang

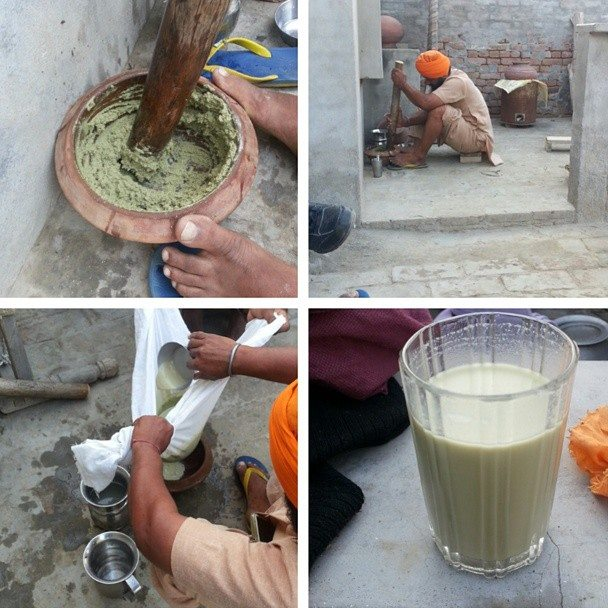
Process of making bhang in a village in Punjab, India

Bhang (Hindi: भाँग, Urdu: بھانگ IAST: Bhāṅg) is an edible preparation made from the leaves of the cannabis plant originating in India. Cannabis sativa is the scientific name of the plant whose leaves are used for bhang preparation. It was used in food and drink as early as 1000 BCE in ancient India. Bhang is traditionally distributed during the spring festival of Maha Shivaratri and Holi. Bhang is mainly used in bhang shops, which sell the cannabis-infused Indian drinks bhang lassi and bhang thandai.

== Western documentation ==
Garcia de Orta, a Portuguese Jewish physician based in Goa, wrote extensively on bangue in his Colóquios dos simples e drogas da India (1563), including its recreational use by Bahadur Shah of Gujarat and by many Portuguese. He explicitly rejected the notion of the Indian plant that produces bangue being the same as the European hemp plant (alcanave).

In 1596, a Dutchman, Jan Huyghen van Linschoten, wrote three pages on "Bangue" in a work documenting his journeys in the East. Despite the other accounts, the 21st-century historian Richard Davenport-Hines lists the late-17th-century and early-18th-century British adventurer Thomas Bowrey as the first Westerner to document the use of bhang.

== Preparation ==
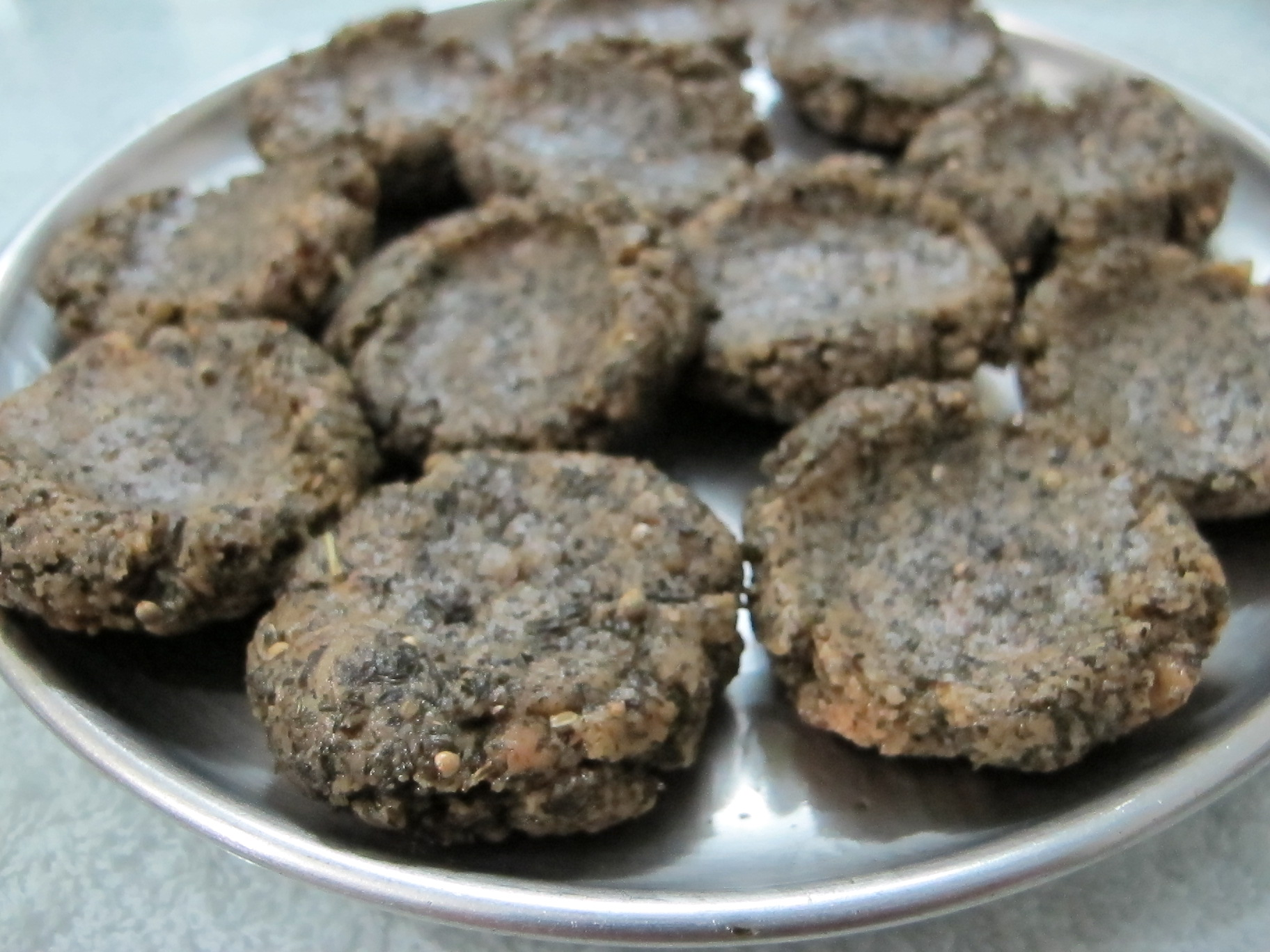
Peda made with bhang leaves

Using a mortar and pestle, the leaves of cannabis are ground into a paste which can be added to foods. For a beverage it is mixed with milk and filtered, then often flavored with kusha grass, sugar, fruit, and various spices. In Mathura it can be found in bhang thandai and bhang lassi. Bhang is also mixed with ghee and sugar to make a purple halva, and into peppery, chewy little balls called goli (which means "tablet" or "pill") in Hindi. Another form is bhang chutney, also called bhangeera ki chutney, a dish served in Kumaoni cuisine from Uttarakhand. It is made from grinding cannabis/bhang seeds with mint, tomatoes and different spices.

== Culture ==
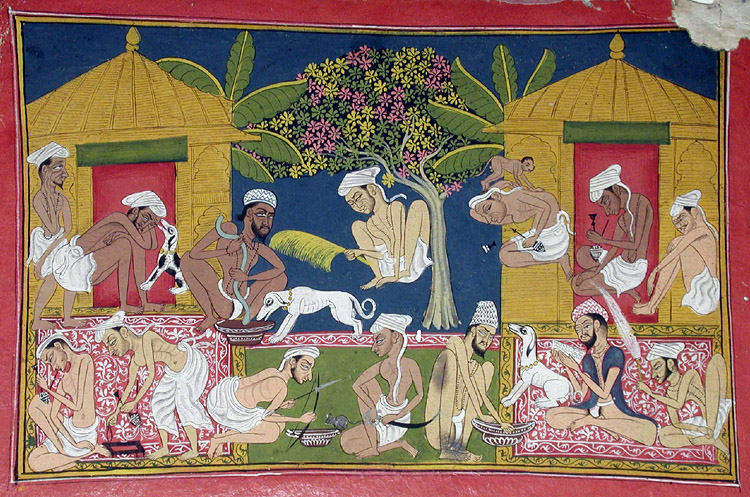
Bhang eaters from India, c. 1790

Bhang is part of the ancient Hindu tradition and custom in the Indian subcontinent. In some parts of rural India, people attribute various medicinal properties to the cannabis plant. If taken in proper quantity, bhang is believed to cure fever, dysentery, and sunstroke, to clear phlegm, aid in digestion, increase appetite, cure speech imperfections and lisping, and give alertness to the body.

Bhang lassi is a preparation of powdered green inflorescence with curd and whey put in a village blender (a hand-blending operation is carried out until the butter rises). It is regarded as tasty and refreshing. It is legal in many parts of India and mainly sold during Holi, when pakoras containing bhang are also sometimes eaten. Uttar Pradesh has licensed bhang shops, and in many places in India one can buy bhang products and drink bhang lassis. Some states such as Bihar and West Bengal also allow the production of bhang. States like Rajasthan do not allow production of bhang but do allow procurement and sale of bhang from such states where production is legal.

The tradition of consuming bhang lassi during Holi is particularly common in North India, where Holi itself is celebrated with a fervor unseen elsewhere. Bhang is heavily consumed in Mathura, an ancient town of religious importance to Hindus. Here, the practice is believed to have been introduced by the followers of Shiva and has stayed ever since. They begin the preparation by Sanskrit chants and recitation of prayers. In Mathura, some people take bhang to work up their appetite while others do it to de-stress. But the hub of bhang use is Varanasi, where the bhang is prepared on its famous ghats.

Bhang is also available as bhang goli which is just freshly ground cannabis with water. Apart from this, sweetened bhang golis are also widely available; these are not considered a drug, but a traditional sleeping aid and appetizer. Bhang goli has metabolizing effects after approximately two hours, sending a user into a dreamlike meditational state. Bhang is also part of many Ayurvedic medicinal preparations. Bhang powder is available legally at ayurvedic dispensaries.

== Legality ==
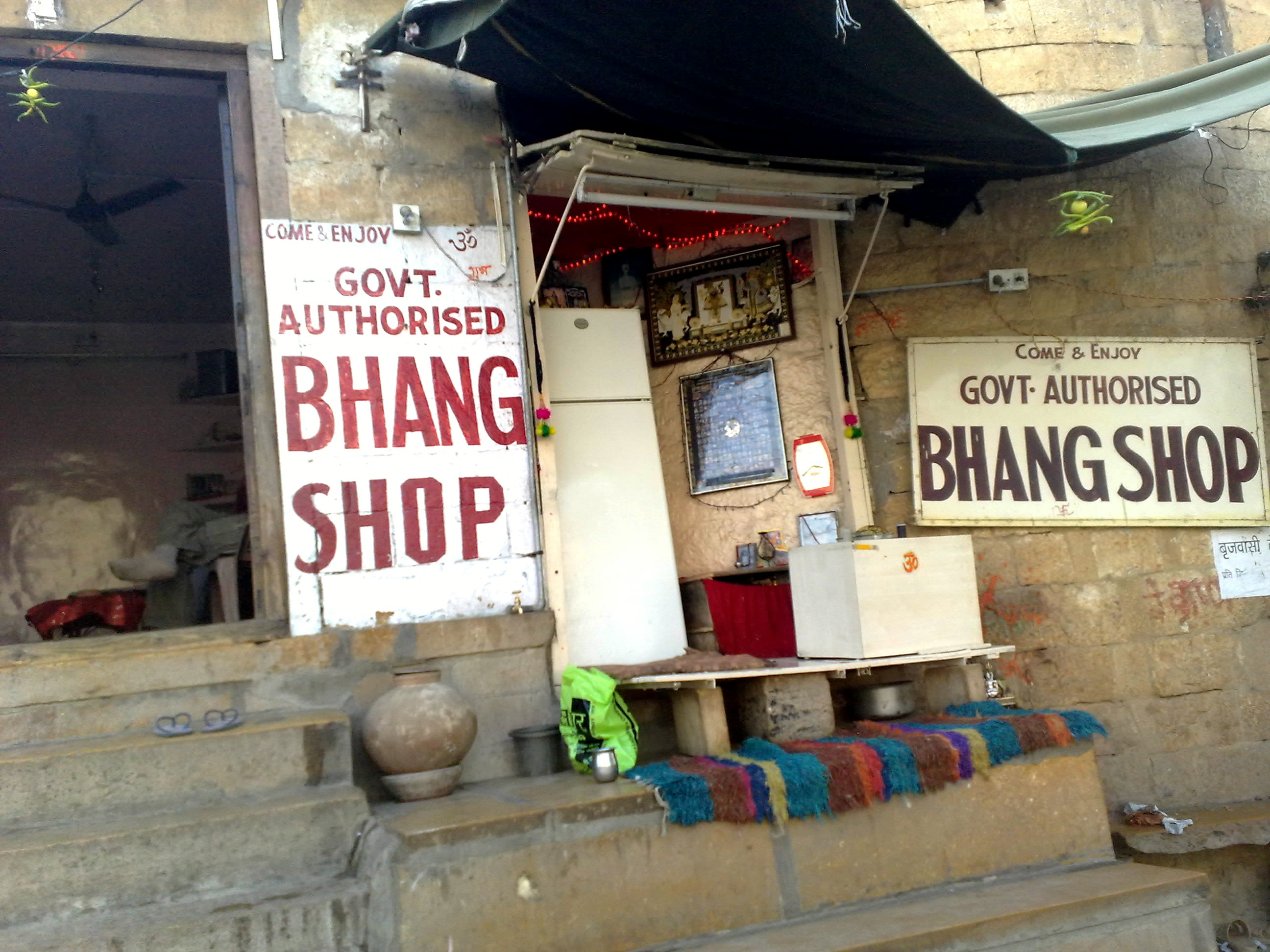
A bhang shop in Jaisalmer, Rajasthan, India

The 1961 Single Convention on Narcotic Drugs was the first ever international treaty to have included cannabis (or marijuana) with other drugs and imposed a blanket ban on their production and supply except for medicinal and research purposes. However, the Single Convention's definition of 'cannabis' does not include the leaves of the cannabis plant, thereby preserving the legality of bhang culture in India.

Regardless, as bhang has a significant role in India's culture and spiritual practices, it is unlikely that a complete criminalization of cannabis throughout the country would succeed. Important festivals such as Holi and Maha Shivratri have traditionally seen people consume bhang during various local festivities. The cultivation of cannabis is regulated by the government.

=== India ===
According to the Narcotic Drugs and Psychotropic Substances (NDPS) Act of 1985:

"cannabis (hemp)" means-

(a) charas, that is, the separated resin, in whatever form, whether crude or purified, obtained from the cannabis plant and also includes concentrated preparation and resin known as hashish oil or liquid hashish;

(b) ganja, that is, the flowering or fruiting tops of the cannabis plant (excluding the seeds and leaves when not accompanied by the tops), by whatever name they may be known or designated; and

(c) any mixture, with or without any neutral material, of any of the above forms of cannabis or any drink prepared therefrom.

As bhang is prepared from the seeds and the leaves of the cannabis plant, it is not banned under the NDPS Act of 1985. However, some states do regulate and ban the sale and consumption of bhang. Bhang can also be used in the form of medicine if the patient has a prescription from an Ayurvedic practitioner.

In states where the sale of bhang is legal, bhang golis or golas are sold openly at places like paan shops, with little to no regulation, at low prices.

== See also ==
- Bhangi Misl – Sovereign state of the Sikh Confederacy (1748-1810)
- Cannabis and Sikhism
- Cannabis in India
- Charas – Hindi name for marijuana resin
- Desi daru – Type of liquor
- Entheogenic use of cannabis – Marijuana used for spiritual or religious purposes
- List of Indian beverages
- Majoun – Moroccan confection
- Siemieniotka – Silesian hemp seed soup
