= Entheogenic use of cannabis =

Marijuana used for spiritual or religious purposes

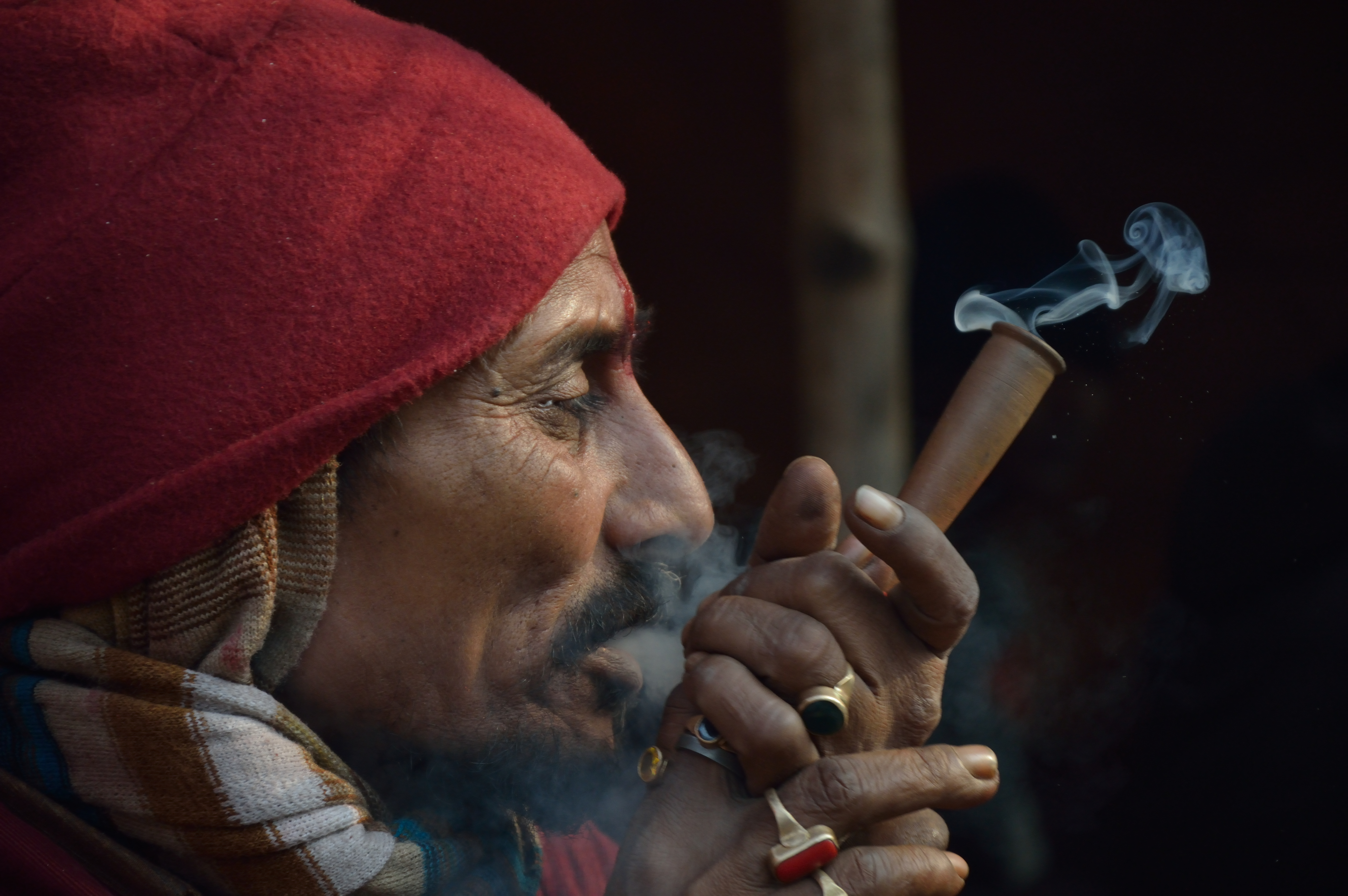
A man smoking cannabis through a pipe in Kolkata, India

Cannabis has served as an entheogen—a chemical substance used in religious or spiritual contexts—in the Indian subcontinent since the Vedic period dating back to approximately 1500 BCE, but perhaps as far back as 2500 BCE in Ancient China. It was introduced to the New World by the Spaniards in 1530-1545.

There are several references in Greek mythology to a powerful drug that eliminated anguish and sorrow. Herodotus wrote about early ceremonial practices by the Scythians, thought to have occurred from the 5th to 2nd century BCE. Itinerant Hindu saints have used it in the Indian subcontinent for centuries. Mexican Native American communities occasionally use cannabis in religious ceremonies by leaving bundles of it on church altars to be consumed by the attendees.

== Indian subcontinent ==
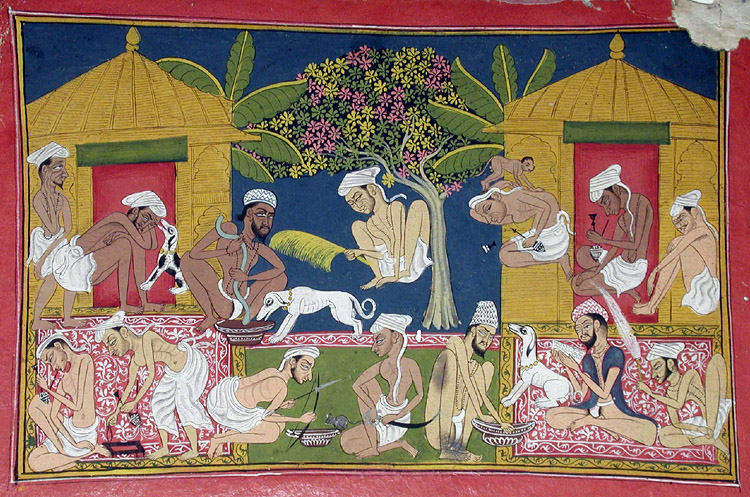
Bhang eaters from India, c. 1790; Bhang is an edible preparation of cannabis native to the Indian subcontinent. It has been used in food and drink as early as 1000 BCE by Hindus in ancient India.

The earliest known reports regarding the sacred status of cannabis in the Indian subcontinent come from the Atharva Veda, estimated to have been written sometime around 2000–1400 BCE, which mentions cannabis as one of the "five sacred plants... which release us from anxiety" and that a guardian angel resides in its leaves. The Vedas also refer to it as a "source of happiness," "joy-giver" and "liberator," and in the Raja Valabba, the gods send hemp to the human race so that they might attain delight, lose fear and have sexual desires. Many households in India own and grow a cannabis plant to be able to offer cannabis to a passing sadhu (ascetic holy men), and during some evening devotional services it is not uncommon for cannabis to be smoked by everyone present.

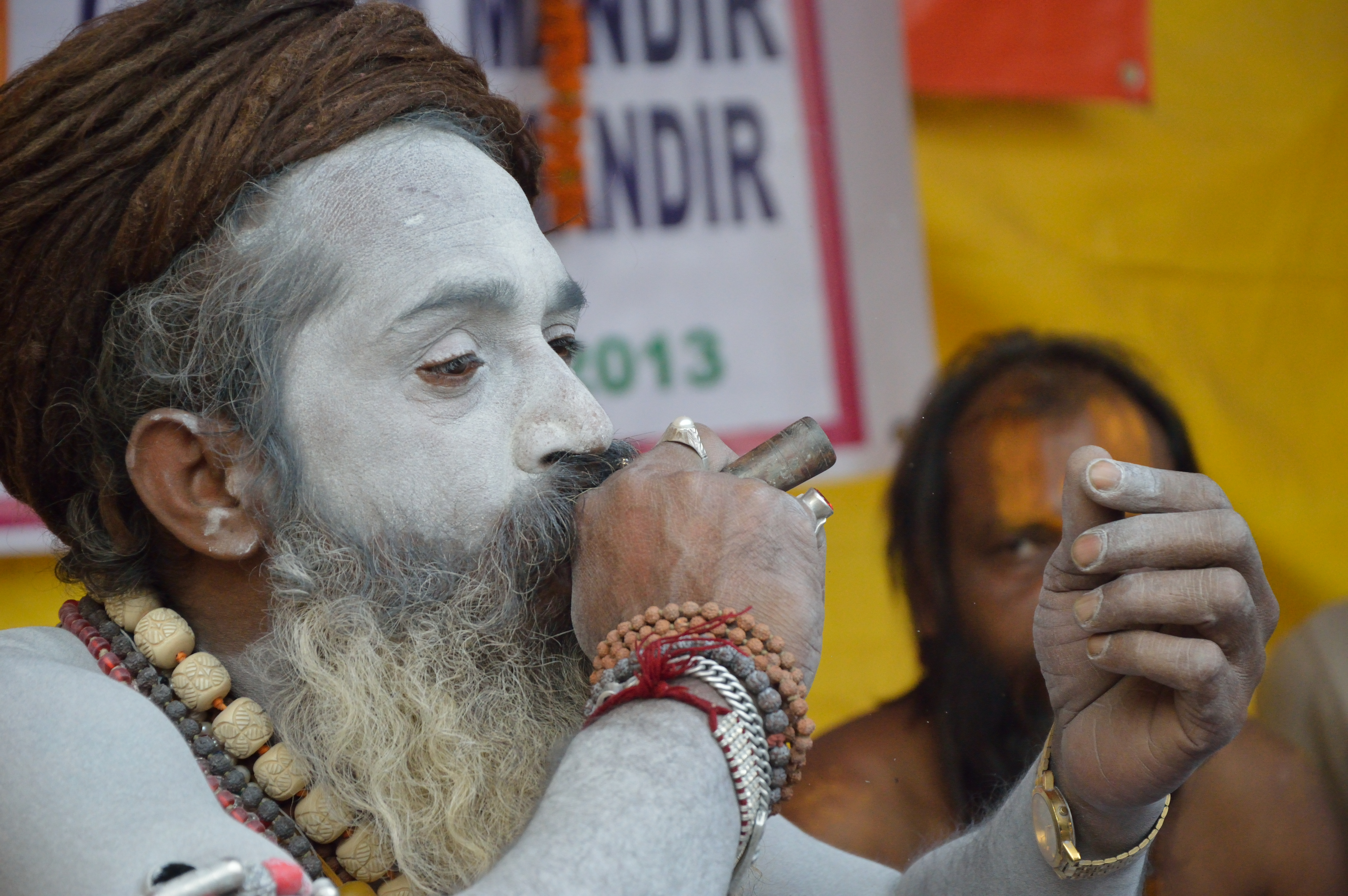
A sadhu, or holy person, smoking cannabis in Kolkata, India

It is still offered to the Lord Shiva in temples on Shivaratri day, while devotional meetings called bhajans, although not necessarily associated with Shiva, are occasions for devotees to consume the drug liberally. Yogis or sadhus along with other Hindu mystics have been known to smoke a mixture of cannabis sativa and tobacco in order to enhance meditation. This is particularly common during the festival of Diwali and Kumbha Mela.

There are three types of cannabis used in the Indian subcontinent. The first, bhang, a type of cannabis edible, consists of the leaves and plant tops of the marijuana plant. It is usually consumed as an infusion in beverage form, and varies in strength according to how much cannabis is used in the preparation. The second, ganja, consisting of the leaves and the plant tops, is smoked. The third, called charas or hashish, consists of the resinous buds and/or extracted resin from the leaves of the marijuana plant. Typically, bhang is the most commonly used form of cannabis in religious festivals.

In Tantric Buddhism, which originated in the Tibeto-Himalayan region, cannabis serves as an important part of a traditional ritual (which may or may not also include sexual intercourse). Cannabis is taken to facilitate meditation and also heighten awareness of all aspects of the ceremony, with a large oral dosage being taken in time with the ceremony so that the climax of the "high" coincides with the climax of the ceremony.

== Ancient China ==
The sinologist and historian Joseph Needham concluded "the hallucinogenic properties of hemp were common knowledge in Chinese medical and Taoist circles for two millennia or more", and other scholars associated Chinese wu (shamans) with the entheogenic use of cannabis in Central Asian shamanism.

In the mountains of western China, significant traces of THC, the compound responsible for cannabis’ psychoactive effects, have been found in wooden bowls, or braziers, excavated from a 2,500-year-old cemetery.

The oldest texts of Traditional Chinese Medicine listed herbal uses for cannabis and noted some psychodynamic effects. The (ca. 100 CE) Chinese pharmacopeia Shennong Ben Cao Jing (Shennong's Classic of Materia Medica) described the use of mafen 麻蕡 "cannabis fruit/seeds":

To take much makes people see demons and throw themselves about like maniacs (多食令人見鬼狂走). But if one takes it over a long period of time one can communicate with the spirits, and one's body becomes light [of weight] (久服通神明輕身).

A Taoist priest in the fifth century A.D. wrote in the Ming-I Pieh Lu that:

Cannabis is used by necromancers, in combination with ginseng to set forward time in order to reveal future events.

Later pharmacopia repeated this description, for instance the (ca. 1100 CE) Zhenglei bencao 證類本草 ("Classified Materia Medica"):

If taken in excess it produces hallucinations and a staggering gait. If taken over a long term, it causes one to communicate with spirits and lightens one's body.

The (ca. 730) dietary therapy book Shiliao bencao 食療本草 ("Nutritional Materia Medica") prescribes daily consumption of cannabis in the following case: "those who wish to see demons should take it (with certain other drugs) for up to a hundred days."

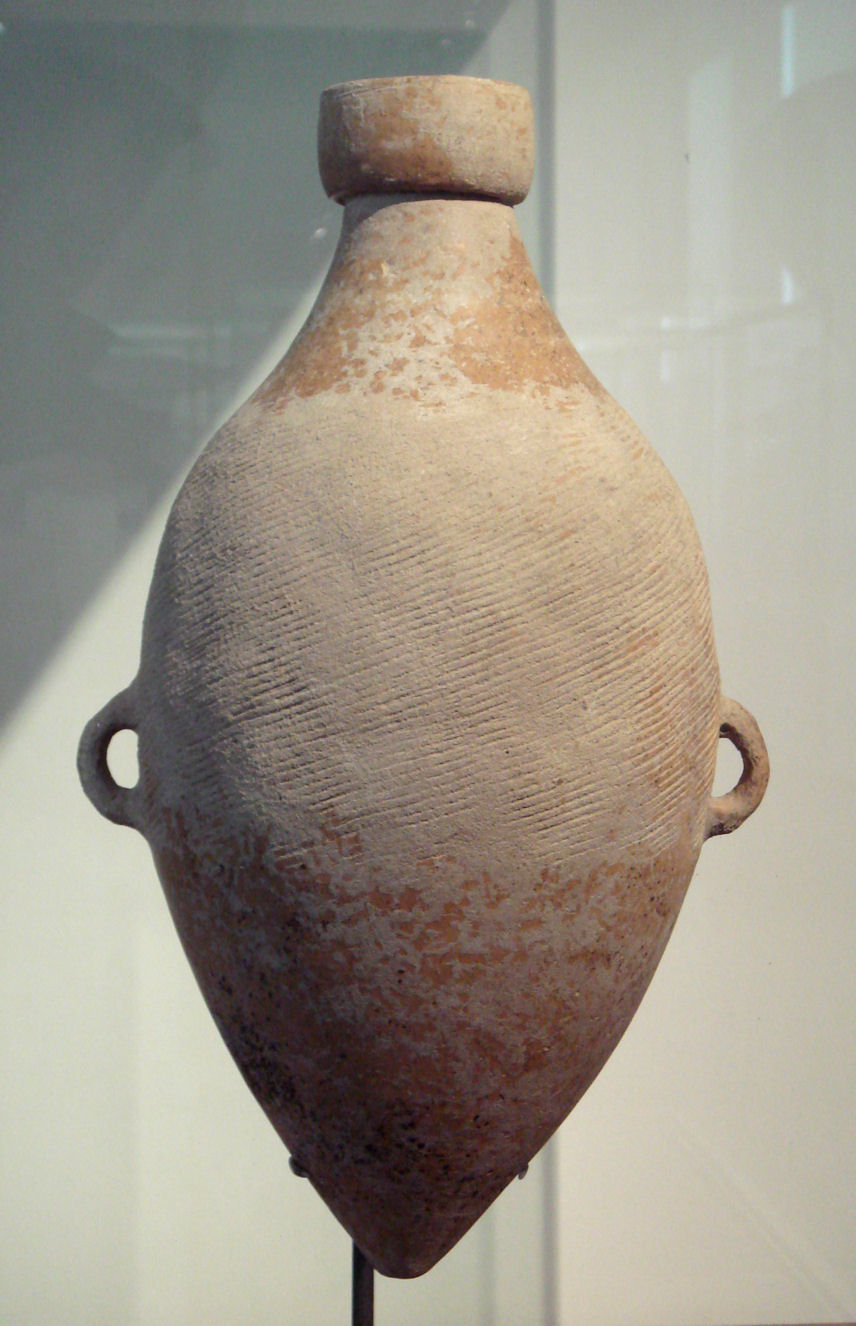
Yangshao culture (ca. 4800 BCE) amphora with hemp cord design

Cannabis has been cultivated in China since Neolithic times, for instance, hemp cords were used to create the characteristic line designs on Yangshao culture pottery). Early Chinese classics have many references to using the plant for clothing, fiber, and food, but none to its psychotropic properties. Some researchers think Chinese associations of cannabis with "indigenous central Asian shamanistic practices" can explain this "peculiar silence". The botanist Li Hui-lin noted linguistic evidence that the "stupefying effect of the hemp plant was commonly known from extremely early times"; the word ma "cannabis; hemp" has connotations of "numbed; tingling; senseless" (e.g., mamu 麻木 "numb" and mazui 麻醉 "anesthetic; narcotic"), which "apparently derived from the properties of the fruits and leaves, which were used as infusions for medicinal purposes." Li suggested shamans in Northeast Asia transmitted the medical and spiritual uses of cannabis to the ancient Chinese wu 巫 "shaman; spirit medium; doctor".

The use of Cannabis as an hallucinogenic drug by necromancers or magicians is especially notable. It should be pointed out that in ancient China, as in most early cultures, medicine has its origin in magic. Medicine men were practicing magicians. In northeastern Asia, shamanism was widespread from Neolithic down to recent times. In ancient China shamans were known as wu. This vocation was very common down to the Han dynasty. After that it gradually diminished in importance, but the practice persisted in scattered localities and among certain peoples. In the far north, among the nomadic tribes of Mongolia and Siberia, shamanism was widespread and common until rather recent times.

Robert Clarke and Mark Merlin, the authors of Cannabis: Evolution and Ethnobotany, suggest that:

After the rise of Confucianism, which spread from China through East Asia to Japan, the ingestion of cannabis resin for psychoactive, ritualistic purification was eventually suppressed in Japan, as it was in China.

== Ancient Central Asia ==
Several of the Tarim mummies excavated near Turpan in Xinjiang province of Northwestern China were buried with sacks of cannabis next to their heads. Based on additional grave goods, archaeologists concluded these individuals were shamans: "The marijuana must have been buried with the dead shamans who dreamed of continuing the profession in another world." A team of scientists analyzed one shamanistic tomb that contained a leather basket with well-preserved cannabis (789 grams of leaves, shoots, and fruits; AMS dated 2475 ± 30 years BP) and a wooden bowl with cannabis traces. Lacking any "suitable evidence that the ancient, indigenous people utilized Cannabis for food, oil, or fiber", they concluded "the deceased was more concerned with the intoxicant and/or medicinal value of the Cannabis remains." The Chinese archaeologist Hongen Jiang and his colleagues excavated a circa 2,400-2,800 BP tomb in northwest China's Turpan Basin and found the remains of an approximately 35-year-old man with Caucasian features who had been buried with thirteen 1-meter cannabis plants, placed diagonally across his chest. Jiang said this is the first archeological discovery of complete cannabis plants, as well as the first incidence of their use as a burial shroud.

Cannabis has been associated with Central Asian burial rituals around the 5th century BCE, as archaeological excavations in 1947 of a series of burial mounds at Pazyryk in the Altai Mountains of Siberia revealed 1.2 meter-high wooden frame tents in each of the mounds. Each frame surrounded a bronze vessel filled with the remains of hemp seeds and stones and were presumably left smoking in the grave. In one of the mounds, a leather pouch containing hemp seeds, and scattered hemp, coriander, and melilotus seeds were also recovered. More recent excavations indicate the cannabis used in the most ancient burials were devoid of THC, while significantly stronger psychoactive cannabis was employed at least 2,500 years ago in the Pamir Mountains.

== Africa ==
According to Alfred Dunhill (1924), Africans have had a long tradition of smoking hemp in gourd pipes, asserting that by 1884 the King of the Baluka tribe of the Congo had established a "riamba" or hemp-smoking cult in place of fetish-worship. Enormous gourd pipes were used. Cannabis was used in Africa to restore appetite and relieve pain of hemorrhoids. It was also used as an antiseptic. In a number of countries, it was used to treat tetanus, hydrophobia, delirium tremens, infantile convulsions, neuralgia and other nervous disorders, cholera, menorrhagia, rheumatism, hay fever, asthma, skin diseases, and protracted labor during childbirth.

In Africa, there were a number of cults and sects of hemp worship. Pogge and Wissman, during their explorations of 1881, visited the Bashilenge, living on the northern borders of the Lundu, between Sankrua and Balua. They found large plots of land around the villages used for the cultivation of hemp. Originally there were small clubs of hemp smokers, bound by ties of friendship, but these eventually led to the formation of a religious cult. The Bashilenge called themselves Bena Riamba, "the sons of hemp", and their land Lubuku, meaning friendship. They greeted each other with the expression "moio", meaning both "hemp" and "life."

Each tribesman was required to participate in the cult of Riamba and show his devotion by smoking as frequently as possible. They attributed universal magical powers to hemp, which was thought to combat all kinds of evil and they took it when they went to war and when they traveled. There were initiation rites for new members which usually took place before a war or long journey. The hemp pipe assumed a symbolic meaning for the Bashilenge somewhat analogous to the significance which the peace pipe had for American Indians. No holiday, no trade agreement, no peace treaty was transacted without it. In the middle Sahara region, the Senusi sect also cultivated hemp on a large scale for use in religious ceremonies.

Part of the Rastafari movement, elders of the 20th-century religious movement known as the Ethiopian Zion Coptic Church, consider cannabis to be the "eucharist", claiming it as an oral tradition from Ethiopia dating back to the time of Christ.

== Europe ==
The (ca. 440 BCE) Greek Histories of Herodotus record the Scythians using cannabis steam baths.

[T]hey make a booth by fixing in the ground three sticks inclined towards one another, and stretching around them woollen felts, which they arrange so as to fit as close as possible: inside the booth a dish is placed upon the ground, into which they put a number of red-hot stones, and then add some hemp-seed. … The Scythians, as I said, take some of this hemp-seed, and, creeping under the felt coverings, throw it upon the red-hot stones; immediately it smokes, and gives out such a vapour as no Grecian vapour-bath can exceed; the Scyths, delighted, shout for joy, and this vapour serves them instead of a water-bath; for they never by any chance wash their bodies with water.

What Herodotus called the "hemp-seed" must have been the whole flowering tops of the plant, where the psychoactive resin is produced along with the fruit ("seeds").

Herodotus also noted that the Thracians, a people who had intimate contact with the Scythians, introduced the plant to the Dacians where it became popular among a shamanic cult named the Kapnobatai, or "Those Who Walk in the Clouds." The shamans of the cult, also called Kapnobatai, were known to use hemp smoke to induce visions and trances.

Burial tombs of the Phrygians and Scythians frequently contained cannabis sativa seeds.

=== Germanic paganism ===
In ancient Germanic paganism, cannabis was possibly associated with the Norse love goddess, Freya. Linguistics offers further evidence of prehistoric use of cannabis by Germanic peoples: The word hemp derives from Old English hænep, from Proto-Germanic *hanapiz, from the same Scythian word that cannabis derives from. The etymology of this word follows Grimm's Law by which Proto-Indo-European initial *k- becomes *h- in Germanic. The shift of *k→h indicates it was a loanword into the Germanic parent language at a time depth no later than the separation of Common Germanic from Proto-Indo-European, about 500 BC.

== Middle East ==
Cannabis oil was likely used throughout the Middle East for centuries before and after the birth of Christ. The Assyrians, Egyptians, and Israelites, among other Afro-Asiatic Languages cultures of the Middle East, mostly acquired cannabis from Aryan cultures and have burned it as an incense as early as 1000 BC. In Egypt, cannabis pollen was recovered from the tomb of Ramesses II, who governed for sixty‐seven years during the 19th dynasty, and several mummies contain trace cannabinoids. Some usage historically also took place amongst Coptic Orthodox aesthetics in Egypt and Ethiopia. Cannabis, as an incense, was used in the temples of Assyria and Babylon because "its aroma was pleasing to the Gods."

=== Ancient Israel ===
It has been generally held by academics specializing in the archaeology and paleobotany of Ancient Israel, and those specializing in the lexicography of the Hebrew Bible that cannabis is not documented or mentioned in early Judaism. Against this, some popular writers have argued that there is evidence for religious use of cannabis in the Hebrew Bible. The primary advocate of the religious use of cannabis in early Judaism was Polish anthropologist Sula Benet, who claimed that the plant kaneh bosem קְנֵה-בֹשֶׂם mentioned five times in the Hebrew Bible, and used in the holy anointing oil of the Book of Exodus, was cannabis. According to theories that hold that cannabis was present in Ancient Israelite society, a variant of hashish is held to have been present. While Benet's conclusion regarding the psychoactive use of cannabis is not universally accepted among Jewish scholars, there is general agreement that cannabis is used in talmudic sources to refer to hemp fibers, not hashish, as hemp was a vital commodity before linen replaced it. Lexicons of Hebrew and dictionaries of plants of the Bible such as by Michael Zohary (1985), Hans Arne Jensen (2004) and James A. Duke (2010) and others identify the plant in question as either Acorus calamus or Cymbopogon citratus, not cannabis.

In 2020, it was announced that cannabis residue had been found on the Israelite sanctuary altar at Tel Arad dating to the 8th century BCE of the Kingdom of Judah, suggesting that cannabis was a part of some Israelite rituals at the time.

== United States ==
The more modern religion of Rastafari (recognized by the Supreme Court as a religion) is quite popular among youth and African American culture.

Even more recently has been the emergence of an entirely new religious philosophy: cantheism. Cantheism is a word that signifies any and all attitudes towards the cannabis plant as a religious experience. While not technically a religion itself, it is a philosophy that examines the inherent religious nature of man’s interaction with the cannabis plant.

United States v. Jefferson, 175 F. Supp. 2d 1123 (N.D. Ind. 2001) states:

As a practical matter, the Court is in agreement with the Government that smoking marijuana at religious rituals all day, every day appears abusive. However, even if the court held that smoking marijuana "all day every day" was excessive, it would still have to determine what an "acceptable level" of usage would be as part of Israel's religion since it is clear that a main doctrine of the religion involves smoking marijuana this much was conceded by the Government. This court has no evidentiary basis with which to make such a determination and any guesswork on the court's part would result in an administrative quagmire for the Probation Office. Thus, for purposes of the court's analysis, it will assume that Israel's usage is consistent with his religious practice.

Chris Conrad coined the term Kantheism, which later became Cantheism (alternately spelled Cannatheism), in 1996, to promote sacramental cannabis practices.

== International movements ==
It is not known when Rastafari first claimed cannabis to be sacred, but it is clear that by the late 1940s Rastafari was associated with cannabis smoking at the Pinnacle community of Leonard Howell. Rastafari see cannabis as a sacramental and deeply beneficial plant that is the Tree of Life mentioned in the Bible and quote Revelation 22:2, "... the herb is the healing of the nations." The use of cannabis, and particularly of long-stemmed water-pipes called chalices, is an integral part of what Rastafari call "reasoning sessions" where members join together to discuss life according to the Rasta perspective of Livity (spiritual concept). They see the use of cannabis as bringing them closer to God (Jah), allowing the user to penetrate the truth of things more clearly, and hold the belief that it allows them to discover their "inner divinity," also called their "ini consciousness".

While it is not necessary to use cannabis to be a Rastafari, many use it regularly as a part of their faith, and pipes of cannabis are dedicated to His Imperial Majesty Haile Selassie I before being smoked. According to the Watchman Fellowship "The herb is the key to new understanding of the self, the universe, and God. It is the vehicle to cosmic consciousness" and is believed to burn the corruption out of the human heart. Rubbing the ashes into the skin from smoked cannabis is also considered a healthy practice. The term and name "Ras-Tafari" which also doubles as a mantra of Rastafari, is the pre-ordination namesake of Haile Selassie I before he was King of Ethiopia- King Ras is seen, by the Rastafarians as a direct blood descendant of King Solomon and thus a continuation of the biblical House of David as well as previous prophecies made by Leonard Howell and the Bible.

== See also ==
- Cannabis and religion
- Entheogenic drugs and the archaeological record
- History of medical cannabis
