= Thandai =

Cold drink from Indian subcontinent

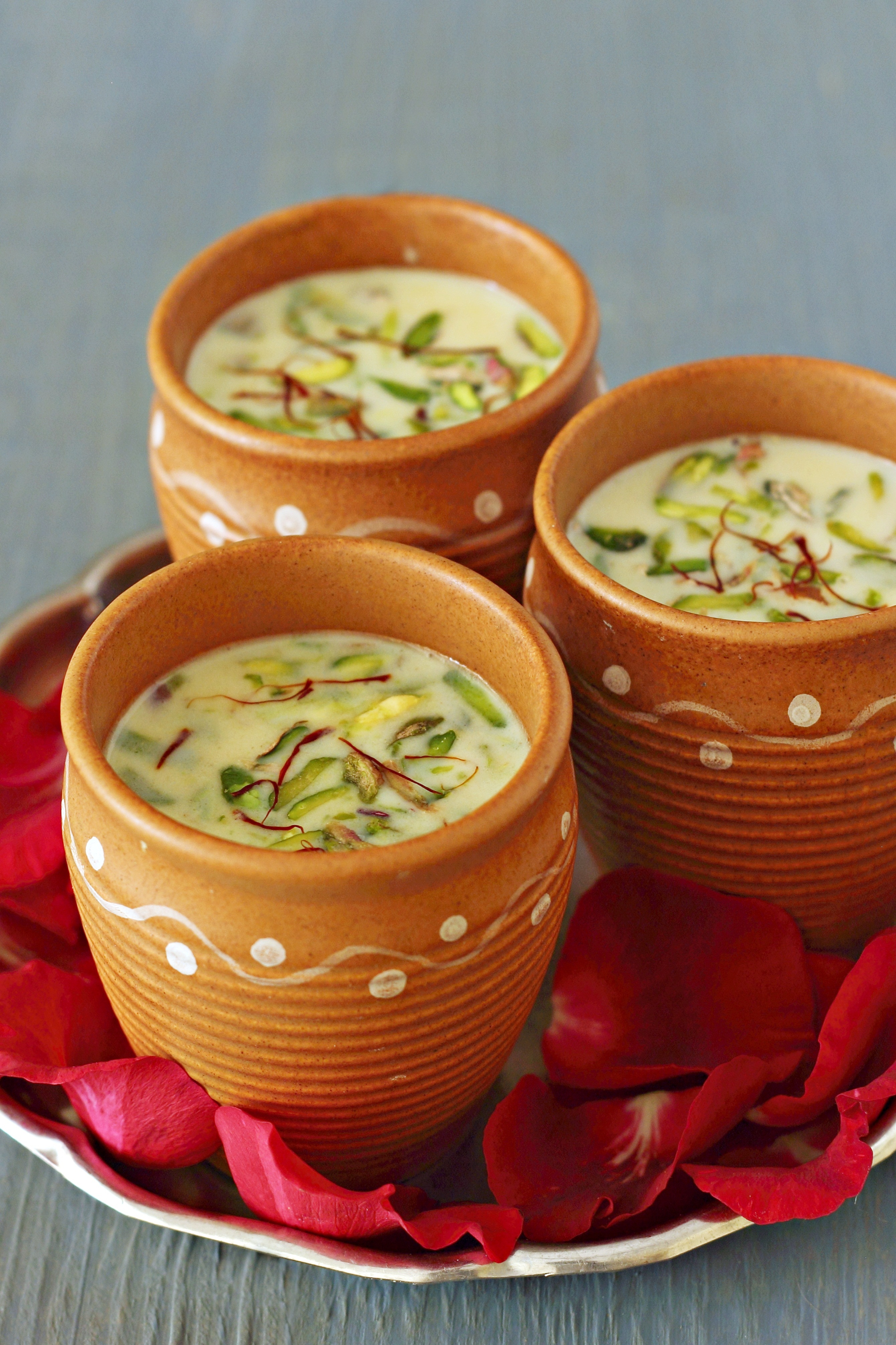
- Alternative names: Sardai
- Course: Beverage
- Place of origin: Indian subcontinent
- Associated cuisine: Indian, Pakistani
- Serving temperature: Chilled or sometimes hot
- Main ingredients: Milk key ingredient, cardamom, almonds, sugar, and saffron, cannabinoids (bhang thandai only)
- Variations: Rose thandai, Mango thandai, Badaam kesar thandai, Bhang thandai

Thandai (also spelt thanday) (Note: Bhojpuri: 𑂘𑂁𑂙𑂰𑂆, Hindi: ठण्डाई, Urdu: ٹھنڈائی, pronounced [ʈʰəɳ.ɖɑːiː]; Punjabi: Gurmukhi: ਠੰਡਾਈ, Shahmukhi: ٹھنڈائی, pronounced [ʈʰəɳ.ɖɑːiː]) or sardai (also spelt sarday) (Note: Hindi: सर्दाई, सरदाई, Urdu: سردائی, pronounced [sər.ɖɑːiː]; Punjabi: Gurmukhi: ਸਰਦਾਈ, Shahmukhi: سردائی, pronounced [sər.ɖɑːiː]) is a cold drink from Indian subcontinent, prepared with a mixture of almonds, fennel seeds, watermelon kernels, rose petals, pepper, poppy seeds, cardamom, saffron, milk and sugar and mainly used in summer. In north Indian Hindu and Sikh culture, it is often associated with the Holi and Hola Mohalla festivals, respectively. It is most commonly consumed in hot areas of north India and Pakistan (especially in the Punjab region and Haryana). There are variants of thandai, the most common being badam (almonds) thandai and bhang (cannabis) thandai.

Thandai is a centerpiece of Holi celebrations where other snacks like dahi vada, gujhia and other savory snacks called chaat are served alongside the cold, sweet beverage.

In recent years it has also become available as a ready-to-drink product and in flavoured dessert forms such as ice-creams and cheesecakes outside the traditional festival season.

== Variations ==
Though thandai refers to a traditional festival drink made with various spices and nuts, this versatile drink can also be prepared in many different ways.

Types of Thandai
Name	Description
Thandai	It is also known as badaam thandai, which is a traditional recipe of drink prepared with exotic nuts and spices.
Rose thandai	This version of thandai is made with rose petals and rose essence.
Mango thandai	This version of thandai with added mango puree makes a perfect summer cooler drink.
Badam kesar thandai	Made with badam (almonds) and kesar (saffron), this drink is often consumed during hot summers.
Bhang thandai	This variation is a cannabis-infused drink that includes bhang, a preparation of cannabis, and thus contains THC and other cannabinoids, causing an intoxicating effect when consumed. Whole milk is often used because its fat content, along with ground nuts, help dissolve the fat-soluble cannabinoids.
