= Cannabis and religion =

Entheogenic use of marijuana

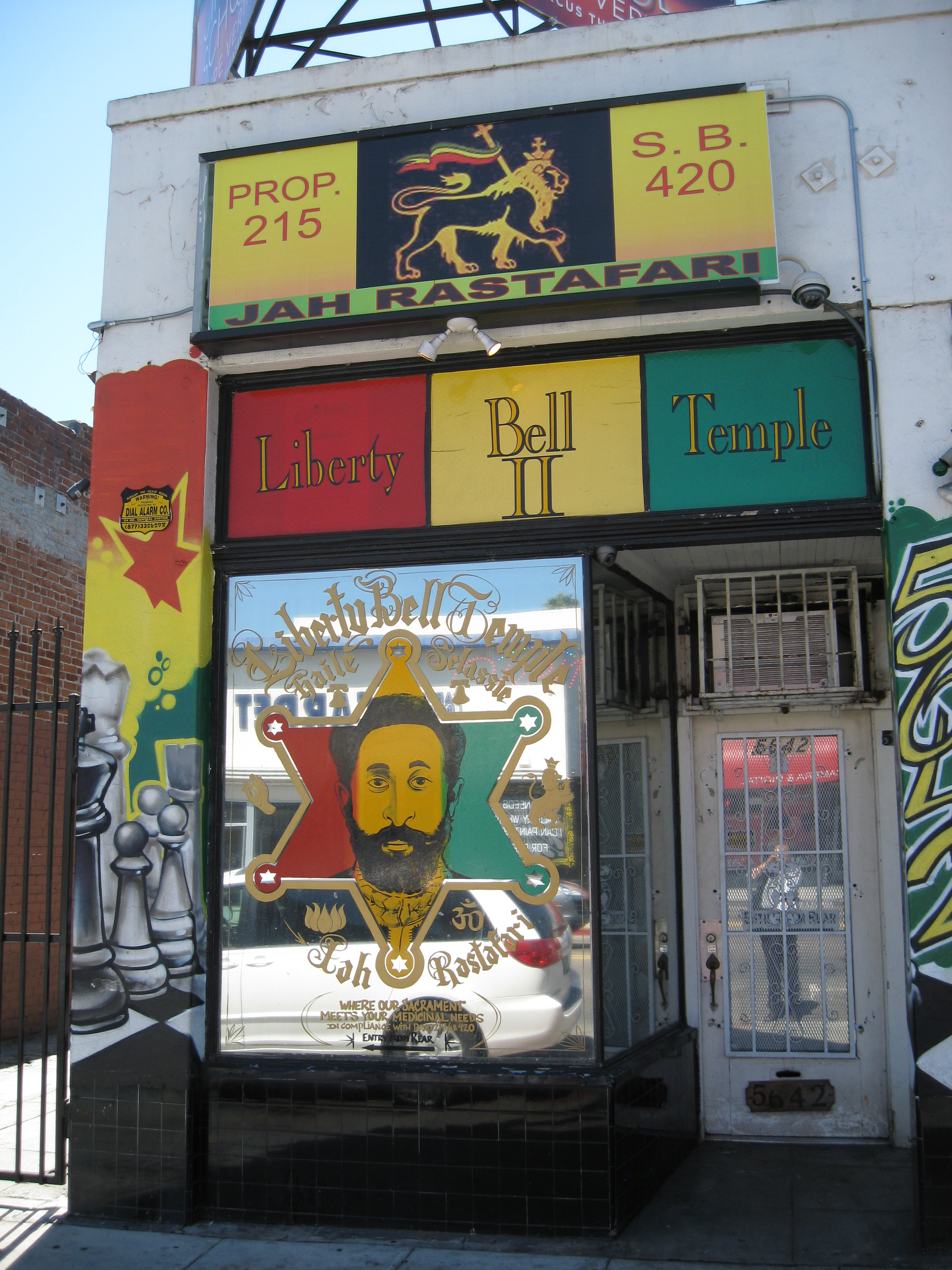
A Rastafari church, Liberty Bell Temple II, in California

Different religions have varying stances on the use of cannabis, historically and presently. In ancient history some religions used cannabis as an entheogen, particularly in the Indian subcontinent where the tradition continues on a more limited basis.

In the modern era Rastafari use cannabis as a sacred herb. Meanwhile, religions with prohibitions against intoxicants, including Buddhism, Baháʼí, and Latter-day Saints (Mormons) forbid usage except with a prescription from a doctor; others have opposed the use of cannabis by members, or in some cases opposed the liberalization of cannabis laws. Other groups, such as some Protestant and Jewish factions, and certain Islamic schools (madhhab) have supported the use of medicinal cannabis.

== Historical religions ==
In Ancient India The earliest known reports regarding the sacred status of cannabis in the Indian subcontinent come from the Atharva Veda, estimated to have been written sometime around 2000–1400 BCE, which mentions cannabis as one of the "five sacred plants... which release us from anxiety" and that a guardian angel resides in its leaves. The Vedas also refer to it as a "source of happiness," "joy-giver" and "liberator," and in the Raja Valabba, the gods send hemp to the human race so that they might attain delight, lose fear and have sexual desires- It is most often with the God Shiva known as the "Lord of Bhang".

In Ancient Egypt there is a written record of the medicinal use of hemp. Thus the Ebers papyrus (written 1500 BCE) mentions the use of oil from hempseed to treat vaginal inflammation. Cannabis pollen was recovered from the tomb of Ramses II, who governed for sixty-seven years during the 19th dynasty, and several mummies contain trace cannabinoids.

The Assyrians, Egyptians, and Hebrews, among other Semitic cultures of the Middle East, mostly acquired cannabis from Aryan cultures and have burned it as an incense as early as 1000 BC. Cannabis oil was likely used throughout the Middle East for centuries before and after the birth of Jesus.

Cannabis has been used by shamanic and pagan cultures to ponder deeply religious and philosophical subjects related to their tribe or society, to achieve a form of enlightenment, to unravel unknown facts and realms of the human mind and subconscious, and also as an aphrodisiac during rituals or orgies. There are several references in Greek mythology to a powerful drug that eliminated anguish and sorrow. Herodotus wrote about early ceremonial practices by the Scythians, thought to have occurred from the 5th to 2nd century BCE.

In addition, according to Herodotus, the Dacians and Scythians had a tradition where a fire was made in an enclosed space and cannabis seeds were burned and the resulting smoke ingested.

In ancient Germanic paganism, cannabis was possibly associated with the Norse love goddess, Freya. Linguistics offers further evidence of prehistoric use of cannabis by Germanic peoples: The word hemp derives from Old English hænep, from Proto-Germanic *hanapiz. While *hanapiz has an unknown origin, some scholars believe it is a unreconstructed loanword of Scythian origin. The Greek word κάνναβις, which that cannabis derives from, is also thought to be a loanword of the same Scythian origin. While a loanword, *hanapiz was borrowed early enough to be affected by Grimm's Law, by which Proto-Indo-European initial *k- becomes *h- in Germanic. The shift of *k→h indicates it was a loanword into the Germanic parent language at a time depth no later than the separation of Common Germanic from Proto-Indo-European, about 500 BC.

== Baháʼí Faith ==
In the Baháʼí Faith, use of alcohol and other drugs for intoxication, as opposed to medical prescription, is prohibited (see Baháʼí laws). But Baháʼí practice is such laws should be applied with "tact and wisdom". The use of tobacco is an individual decision; it is yet strongly frowned on but not explicitly forbidden. Baháʼí authorities have spoken against intoxicant drugs since the earliest stages of the religion, with ‘Abdu’l-Bahá writing:

Regarding hashish you have pointed out that some Persians have become habituated to its use. Gracious God! This is the worst of all intoxicants, and its prohibition is explicitly revealed. Its use causeth the disintegration of thought and the complete torpor of the soul. How could anyone seek the fruit of the infernal tree, and by partaking of it, be led to exemplify the qualities of a monster? How could one use this forbidden drug, and thus deprive himself of the blessings of the All-Merciful? Alcohol consumeth the mind and causeth man to commit acts of absurdity, but this opium, this foul fruit of the infernal tree, and this wicked hashish extinguish the mind, freeze the spirit, petrify the soul, waste the body and leave man frustrated and lost.

Regarding marijuana specifically, The Universal House of Justice directs the reader to consider the above passage penned by ‘Abdu’l-Bahá and enjoins the following:

Although we have found no direct reference to marijuana in the Bahá’í writings, since this substance is derived from what is considered to be a milder form of cannabis, the species used to produce hashish...

Later, the Universal House of Justice made allowance for the use of medicinal marijuana specifically as prescribed by a medical doctor. (Note: Letters from the Universal House of Justice to individual enquirers concerning this purpose are dated 19 September 2000, and 16 December 2008.) This allowance is made strictly subject to the laws of governing bodies and medical expertise:

Bahá’ís are required to be obedient to the provisions of both civil law and Bahá’í law. As regards the Bahá’í position, it is that a believer is only permitted to use substances such as marijuana when they are prescribed for medicinal purposes. However, a Bahá’í must also satisfy civil law requirements; your letter indicates that the use of marijuana is illegal in [your state] ... for any purpose, in which case it would not be permissible for a Bahá’í to use it even to meet a medical need.

== Buddhism ==
In Buddhism, the Fifth Precept is frequently interpreted to mean "refrain from intoxicating drinks and drugs which lead to heedlessness", although in some direct translations, the Fifth Precept refers specifically to alcohol. Cannabis and some other psychoactive plants are specifically prescribed in the Mahākāla Tantra for medicinal purposes.

Views on drugs, especially natural or herbal ones such as cannabis, vary widely among the various Buddhist sects, which can be summarized into Theravada Buddhism, Mahayana Buddhism and Vajrayana Buddhism. The Theravada tradition keeps the Fifth Precept for laypeople more seriously, as well as literally according to the words of the phrasing, i.e. "I vow to abstain from fermented drinks" (Pali: Surāmerayamajjapamādaṭṭhānā veramaṇī sikkhāpadaṃ samādiyāmi), and tends to be more anti-alcohol and anti-drug in general than the other Buddhist traditions. In Mahayana Buddhism, the (specifically Mahayana) Bodhisattva Precepts override the Vinaya Precepts (or pratimoksha vows), which it shares in common with the Theravada but emphasizes less.

The main thrust of the Bodhisattva ethical code is that anything which is beneficial for oneself and others should be adopted, while anything harmful to oneself and others should be avoided. This leaves more room for medical interpretations of cannabis. Vajrayana Buddhism is probably the most open to cannabis use, especially in the sense that the Vajrayana Precepts urge the aspirant to develop "pure view", in which one extracts the pure essence of all things through seeing their true nature of śūnyatā, including things normally seen as defiled such as sex and, as mentioned in some Tantric Buddhist texts, drugs including cannabis. Moreover herbal medicine, including some natural psychoactive drugs, is deeply linked with the Tantric Buddhist traditions of Vajrayana, in particular Tibetan Buddhism. Although the Vajrayana traditions also maintain the Vinaya and Bodhisattva Precepts, the Tantric Precepts or samaya, which reflect Vajrayana doctrine, are held to be paramount.

Thus, it would seem that in Theravada Buddhism, cannabis is mostly discouraged, in Mahayana Buddhism, cannabis is somewhat discouraged in some contexts, and in Vajrayana Buddhism, cannabis is only slightly discouraged or even encouraged in some contexts.

Moreover, in the West, Buddhism has had a strong association with psychedelic and psychoactive drugs due to the beatniks and hippies of the 1950s through 1970s. Although Buddhism does not explicitly encourage such drugs in general, Buddhist scriptures generally have little to say against any drug in particular, other than alcohol.

Generally speaking, most Buddhists (including the Dalai Lama) are accepting of medical marijuana, and the concept of using marijuana to treat specific physical and mental ailments.

== Christianity ==
In a 2021 Pew Research Center poll, it was determined that irreligious persons were significantly more accepting of the health benefits of medical cannabis than Christians.

=== Catholicism ===
Prior to assuming his position as leader of the Catholic Church, Pope Francis had spoken against recreational cannabis. He stated in 2013 in Buenos Aires: "A reduction in the spread and influence of drug addiction will not be achieved by a liberalization of drug use." The catechism of the Catholic Church states that "The use of drugs inflicts very grave damage on health and life. Their use, except on strictly therapeutic grounds, is a grave offense." However, medical marijuana for therapeutic use may be permissible.

=== Orthodoxy ===
The Georgian Orthodox Church has resisted legalization of cannabis in Georgia.

=== Protestantism ===
The Arkansas Baptist State Convention voted to discourage medical marijuana in 2016. In 2016, the executive director of the Florida Baptist Convention, Tommy Green, also said that congregations should be encouraged to vote against the Florida Amendment 2 (2016) which expanded legalization of medical marijuana in Florida. The National Evangelical Association of Belize opposed the 2017 decriminalization of cannabis in Belize.

The Assemblies of God USA, as well as other Pentecostal and holiness churches, have historically advocated abstinence from all alcohol, tobacco, and narcotics. Supporters of this view generally cite biblical passages enjoining respect for one's body as well as forbidding intoxication.

Other Protestant churches have endorsed the legality of medical marijuana, including the Presbyterian Church (USA), United Methodist Church, United Church of Christ, and the Episcopal Church.

=== The Church of Jesus Christ of Latter-day Saints ===
In the Church of Jesus Christ of Latter-day Saints (LDS Church), there is general prohibition against intoxicating substances as stated in its health code called the Word of Wisdom. In August 1915, the LDS Church banned the use of cannabis by its members. In 2016, the church's highest governing body (the First Presidency) urged members to oppose legalization of recreational cannabis use. The LDS Church said in 2016 it "raised no objection" to a state bill on non-psychoactive medical marijuana in Utah.

=== Quakerism ===
A group of Quaker syncretists noted cannabis use could be spiritually enhancing. Quakers, however have noted a high degree of acceptance of sobriety. Anecdotes from Quakers who use cannabis suggest a positive connection between the substance and Quakerism as a whole.

== Hinduism ==
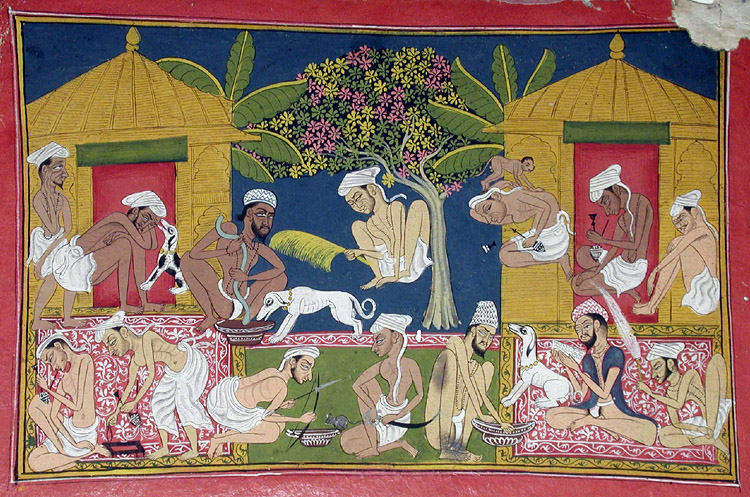
Bhang eaters from India c. 1790. Bhang is an edible preparation of cannabis native to the Indian subcontinent. It has been used in food and drink as early as 1000 BCE by Hindus in ancient India.

During the Hindu festival of Holi and Maha Shivratri, people consume bhang which contains cannabis flowers. According to one description, when the amrita (elixir of life) was produced from the churning of the ocean by the devas and the asuras as described in the Samudra manthan, Shiva created cannabis from his own body to purify the elixir (whence, for cannabis, the epithet angaja or "body-born"). Another account suggests that the cannabis plant sprang up when a drop of the elixir dropped on the ground. Thus, cannabis is used by sages due to association with elixir and Shiva.

In Hinduism, wise drinking of bhang (which contains cannabis), according to religious rites, is believed to cleanse sins, unite one with Shiva and avoid the miseries of hell in the future life. It is also believed to have medicinal benefits and is used in Ayurvedic medicine. In contrast, foolish drinking of bhang without rites is considered a sin.

== Islam ==
The Quran does not mention cannabis. All major Sunni and Shia scholars considered it by analogy (qiyas) to be similar to khamr (intoxicants/alcoholic drink) and therefore deemed it haraam (forbidden).

Those scholars who consider cannabis forbidden refer to a hadith by the prophet Mohammed regarding alcoholic drinks, which states: "If much intoxicates, then even a little is haraam." However, early Muslim jurists differentiated cannabis from alcohol, and despite restrictions on alcohol, cannabis use was prevalent in the Islamic world until the 18th century. Today, cannabis is still consumed in many parts of the Islamic world, even sometimes in a religious context particularly within the Sufi mystic movement. In 1378 Soudoun Sheikouni, the Emir of the Joneima in Arabia, prohibited cannabis, considered one of the world's first-attested cannabis bans.

Some attribute the discovery of cannabis to Sheikh Haydar, a Sufi leader in the 12th century. Other Sufis attribute its origin to the apocryphal Khidr ("Green Man").

Some modern Islamic leaders state that medical cannabis, but not recreational, is permissible in Islam. Imam Mohammad Elahi in Dearborn Heights, Michigan (United States), declared: "Obviously, smoking marijuana for fun is wrong... It should be permissible only if that is the only option in a medical condition prescribed by medical experts." Non-intoxicating cannabis products such as CBD and hemp are considered by many Islamic jurists to be permissible, especially when prescribed by a doctor as a treatment for an illness. Products containing THC, however, are almost universally considered non-permissible, as THC is the psychoactive component of cannabis.

The Nizari Shia military order which emerged after the fall of the Fatimid Caliphate is known in English as the Assassins. This name has been suggested to derive from the Arabic word hashishin, meaning "hashish-smokers," after their purported use of hashish in esoteric rituals, brainwashing, and to celebrate a successful kill; however, historians dispute the extent to which these claims about the Assassins are true; some of these claims may be rumours or embellishments put about by the Assassins' enemies, or spread by the Assassins themselves to further their fearsome reputation. Other historians claim that these rituals were a form of self-defence to grieve a fallen comrade or family member, for example, rather than just celebration to honour a kill.

== Judaism ==
Modern rabbis have debated whether cannabis is permissible under Jewish law for recreational or medicinal purposes. Orthodox rabbi Moshe Feinstein stated in 1973 that cannabis was not permitted under Jewish law, due to its harmful effects. However Orthodox rabbis Efraim Zalmanovich (2013) and Chaim Kanievsky (2016) stated that medical, but not recreational, cannabis is kosher.

Though the argument is regarded as a fringe and erroneous theory by mainstream scholars, some writers have theorized that cannabis may have been used ritually in early Judaism. Sula Benet (1967) claimed that the plant q'neh bosem קְנֵה-בֹשֶׂם mentioned five times in the Hebrew Bible, and used in the holy anointing oil of the Book of Exodus, was in fact cannabis, although lexicons of Hebrew and dictionaries of plants of the Bible such as by Michael Zohary (1985), Hans Arne Jensen (2004) and James A. Duke (2010) and others identify the plant in question as either Acorus calamus or Cymbopogon citratus. In 2020 a study at Tel Arad, a 2700-year-old shrine then at the southern frontier of the Kingdom of Judah, found that burnt offerings on one altar contained multiple cannabinoid compounds, suggesting the ritual use of cannabis within ancient Judaism.

== Rastafari ==
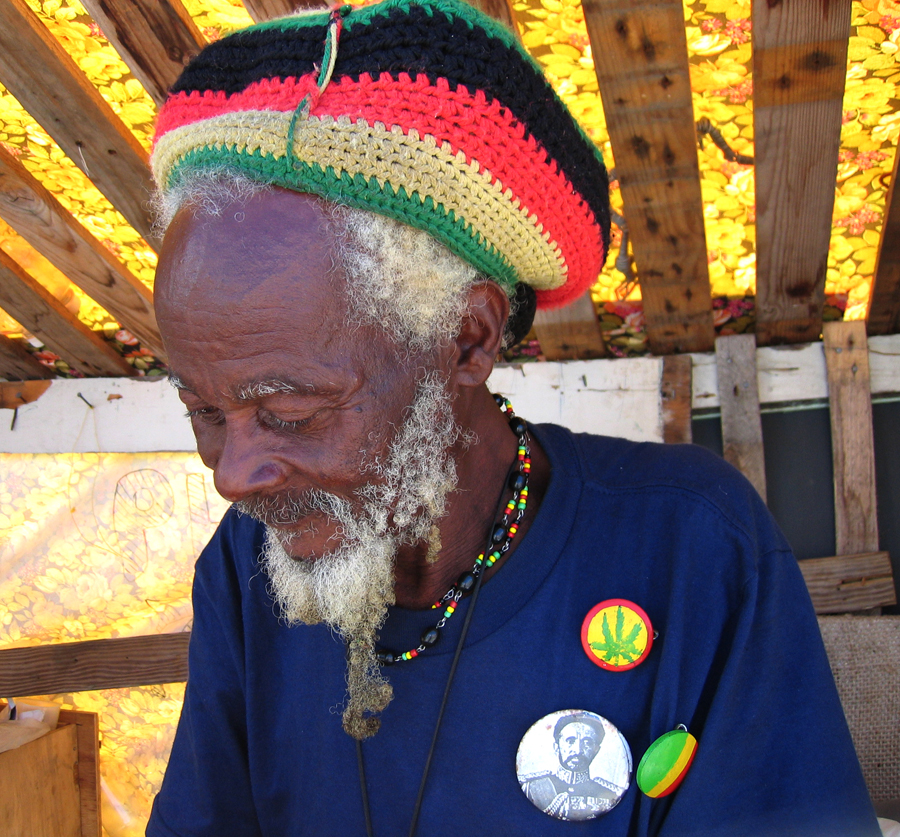
Rastaman in Barbados sporting a cannabis badge above a badge displaying Haile Selassie

It is not known when Rastafari first claimed cannabis to be sacred, but it is clear that by the late 1940s Rastafari was associated with cannabis smoking at the Pinnacle community of Leonard Howell. Rastafari see cannabis as a sacramental and deeply beneficial plant that is the Tree of Life mentioned in the Bible and quote Revelation 22:2, "... the herb is the healing of the nations." The use of cannabis, and particularly of long-stemmed water-pipes called chalices, is an integral part of what Rastafari call "reasoning sessions" where members join together to discuss life according to the Rasta perspective. They see the use of cannabis as bringing them closer to God (Jah), allowing the user to penetrate the truth of things more clearly.

While it is not necessary to use cannabis to be a Rastafari, many use it regularly as a part of their faith, and pipes of cannabis are dedicated to His Imperial Majesty Haile Selassie I before being smoked. According to the Watchman Fellowship "The herb is the key to new understanding of the self, the universe, and God. It is the vehicle to cosmic consciousness" and is believed to burn the corruption out of the human heart. Rubbing the ashes into the skin from smoked cannabis is also considered a healthy practice.

Part of the Rastafari movement, elders of the 20th-century religious movement known as the Ethiopian Zion Coptic Church, consider cannabis to be the "eucharist", claiming it as an oral tradition from Ethiopia dating back to the time of Christ.

== Sikhism ==
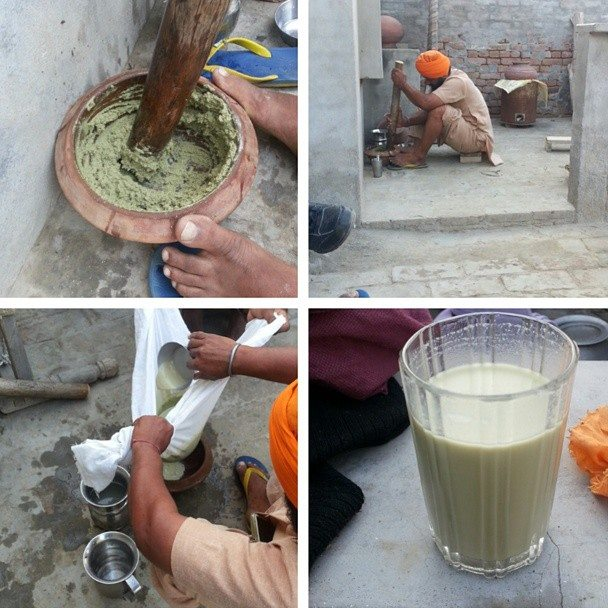
Process of making bhang in a Sikh village in Punjab, India. Photos taken by Marcus Prasad

In Sikhism, the First Sikh Guru, Guru Nanak, stated that using any mind altering substance (without medical purposes) is a distraction to keeping the mind clean of the name of God. According to the Sikh Rehat Maryada, "A Sikh must not take hemp (cannabis), opium, liquor, tobacco, in short any intoxicant. His only routine intake should be food and water".

However, there exists a tradition of Sikhs using edible cannabis, often in the form of the beverage bhang, particularly among the Sikh community known as Nihang.

== Taoism ==
Beginning around the 4th century, Taoist texts mentioned using cannabis in censers. Needham cited the (ca. 570 AD) Taoist encyclopedia Wushang Biyao (Chinese: 無上秘要) ("Supreme Secret Essentials") that cannabis was added into ritual incense-burners, and suggested the ancient Taoists experimented systematically with "hallucinogenic smokes". The Yuanshi shangzhen zhongxian ji 元始上真眾仙記 ("Records of the Assemblies of the Perfected Immortals"), which is attributed to Ge Hong (283-343), says:

For those who begin practicing the Tao it is not necessary to go into the mountains. … Some with purifying incense and sprinkling and sweeping are also able to call down the Perfected Immortals. The followers of the Lady Wei and of Hsu are of this kind.

Lady Wei Huacun (Chinese: 魏華存) (252-334) and Xu Mi (Chinese: 許謐) (303-376) founded the Taoist Shangqing School. The Shangqing scriptures were supposedly dictated to Yang Xi (Chinese: 楊羲) (330-c. 386) in nightly revelations from immortals, and Needham proposed Yang was "aided almost certainly by cannabis". The Mingyi bielu (Chinese: 名醫別錄) ("Supplementary Records of Famous Physicians"), written by the Taoist pharmacologist Tao Hongjing (456-536), who also wrote the first commentaries to the Shangqing canon, says, "Hemp-seeds (Chinese: 麻勃) are very little used in medicine, but the magician-technicians (shujia 術家) say that if one consumes them with ginseng it will give one preternatural knowledge of events in the future." A 6th-century AD Taoist medical work, the Wuzangjing (Chinese: 五臟經) ("Five Viscera Classic") says, "If you wish to command demonic apparitions to present themselves you should constantly eat the inflorescences of the hemp plant."

Joseph Needham connected myths about Magu, "the Hemp Damsel", with early Daoist religious usages of cannabis, pointing out that Magu was goddess of Shandong's sacred Mount Tai, where cannabis "was supposed to be gathered on the seventh day of the seventh month, a day of seance banquets in the Taoist communities."

== Other cannabis-using religious movements ==
Other religions have been founded in the past century that treat cannabis as a sacrament. They include the Santo Daime church, the THC Ministry, Cantheism, the Cannabis Assembly, the Church of Cognitive Therapy (COCT Ministry), Temple 420, Green Faith Ministries, the Church of Cognizance, the Church of the Universe, the Free Marijuana Church of Honolulu, the First Cannabis Church of Florida World Wide, the Free Life Ministry Church of Canthe, the Church of Higher Consciousness, Philadelphia Temple of Hemp and Cannabis, First Cannabis Church of Logic and Reason, and the federally tax-exempt inFormer Ministry Collective of Palms Springs, California.

The Temple of the True Inner Light believes that cannabis, in addition to psychedelics like dipropyltryptamine (DPT), is a physical manifestation of God. The First Church of Cannabis Inc. officially gained legal recognition in Indiana in 2015 following the passage of that state's Religious Freedom Restoration Act. Nonprofit religious organization Elevation Ministries opened its Denver headquarters, known as the International Church of Cannabis, on 20 April, 2017.

Some modern spiritual figures like Ram Dass openly acknowledge that the use of cannabis has allowed them to gain a more spiritual perspective and use the herb frequently for both its medicinal and mind-altering properties.

In Mexico, followers of the growing cult of Santa Muerte regularly use marijuana smoke in purification ceremonies, with marijuana often taking the place of incense used in mainstream Catholic rituals.

== See also ==
- Religion and drugs
- Charas
- Entheogenic drugs and the archaeological record
- Free Exercise Clause
- Freedom of thought
- Magu (deity)
- Psychedelic Cults and Outlaw Churches
