= Church of Cannabis =

Church of Cannabis may refer to:

- First Church of Cannabis, founded in 2015 in Indiana
- International Church of Cannabis, founded in 2017 in Colorado
- First Cannabis Church of Logic and Reason, founded in 2016 in Michigan
