= Cannabis in the restaurant industry =

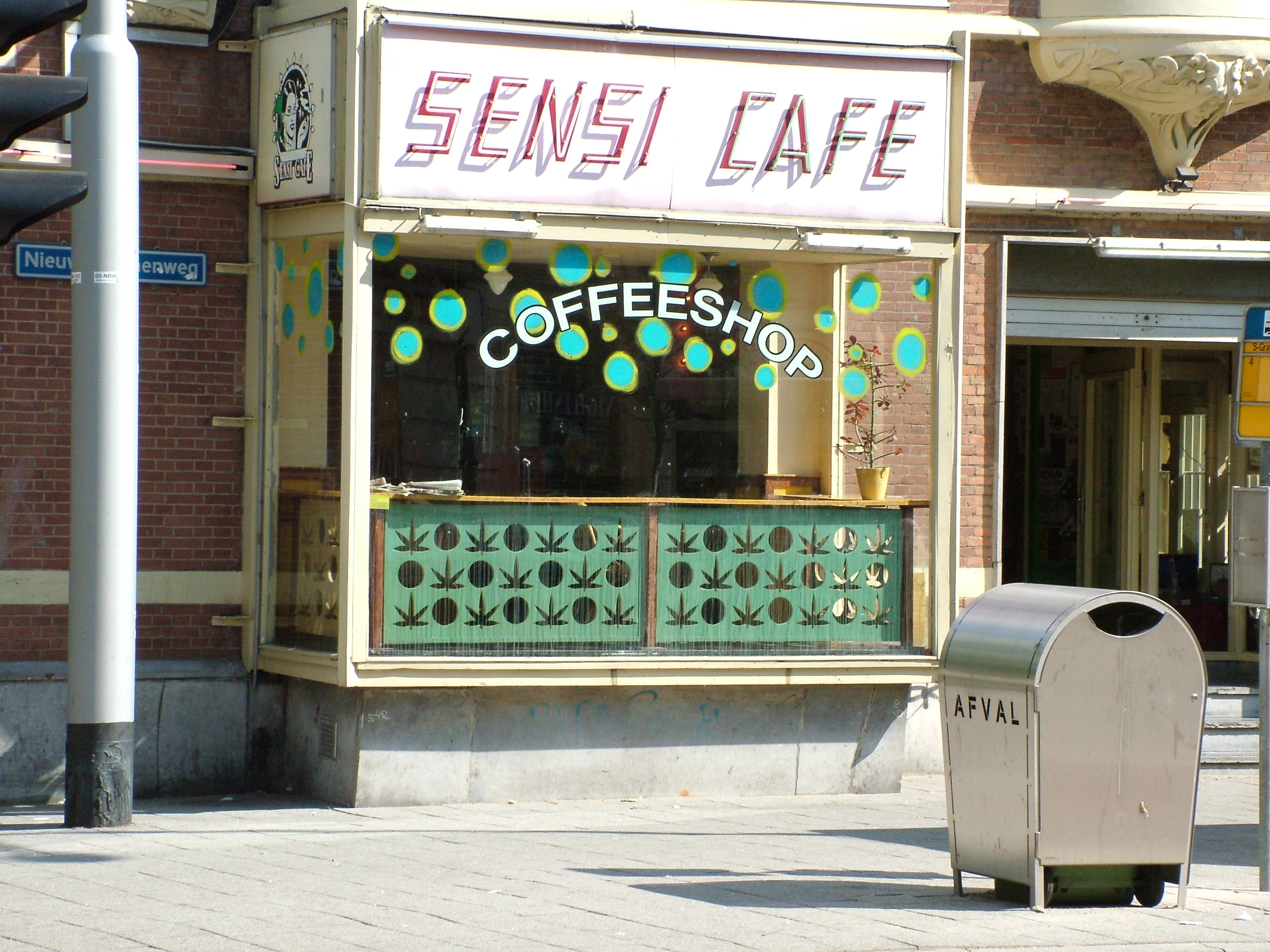
Sensi Cafe, a coffeeshop in Rotterdam, Netherlands, in 2004

There are various intersections of cannabis and the restaurant industry.

== Cannabis culture ==
=== Cannabis-themed restaurants ===
Among cannabis-themed restaurants is the fast food chain Cheba Hut, which is named after the 1980s song about marijuana "Cheeba Cheeba". The Joint opened in Sanford, Florida, in 2023.

=== Marketing and April 20 ("420") promotions ===
Some restaurant chains have "nodded" to cannabis consumers on social media, including Chipotle Mexican Grill and Denny's. Notable chains that have offered specials on April 20, a date with significance in cannabis culture ("420"), include:

- &pizza
- Carl's Jr.
- Cheba Hut
- Chronic Tacos
- Fatburger
- Insomnia Cookies
- Jack in the Box
- Jimmy John's
- Mellow Mushroom
- Popeyes
- Smashburger
- Smoothie King
- Wingstop

In New Mexico, a McDonald's franchise placed a billboard with the text, "Usually, when you roll something this good, it's illegal!" The parent company removed the ad and said in a statement, "this local franchise's billboard does not meet our standards".

== On-site consumption ==
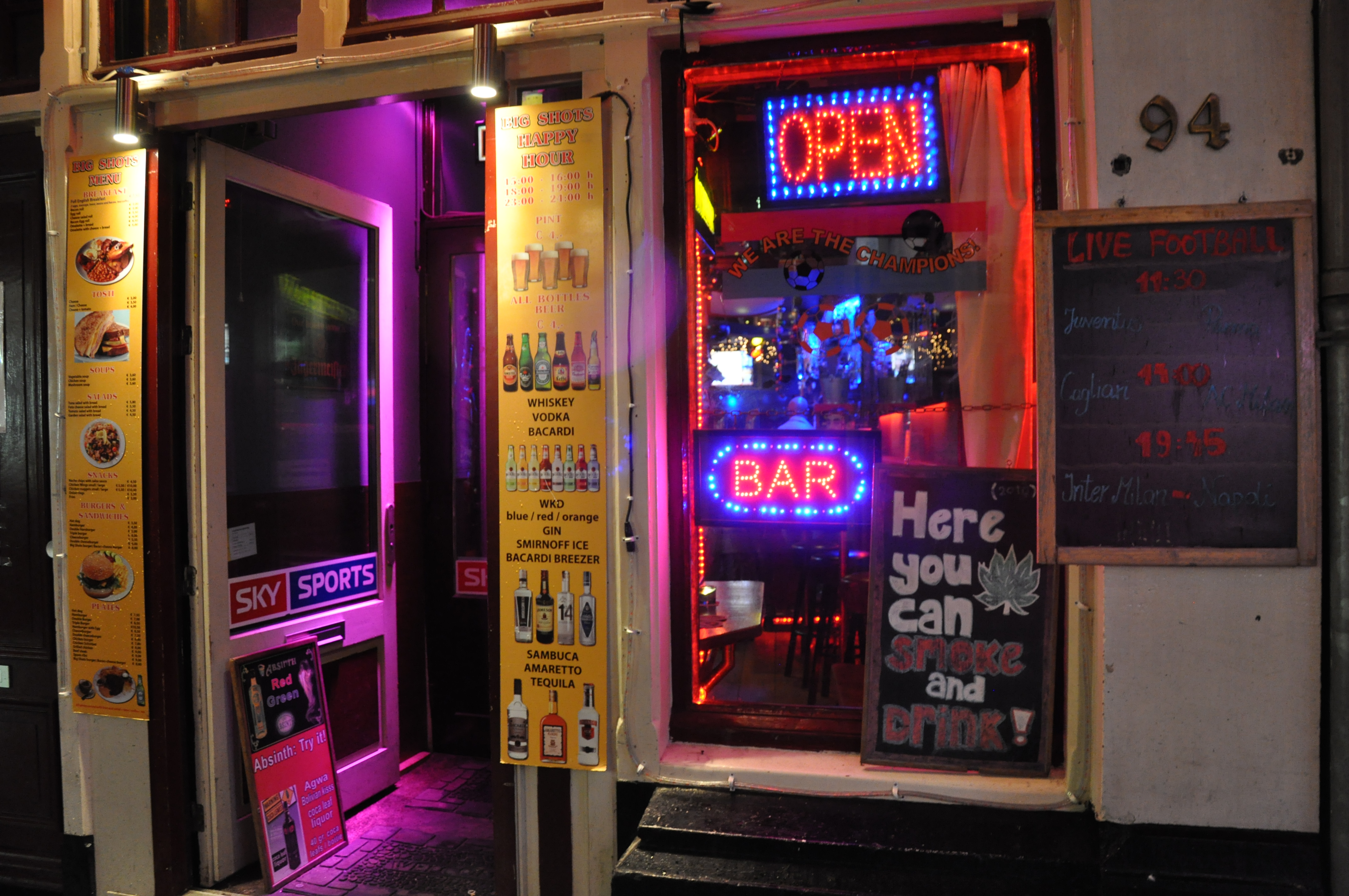
A coffeeshop in Amsterdam; a sign reads, "Here you can smoke and drink!"

Coffeeshops are establishments in the Netherlands where the sale of cannabis for personal consumption by the public is tolerated by the local authorities.

In Portland, Oregon, the World Famous Cannabis Cafe operated between 2009 and 2016.

=== Cannabis-infused menu offerings ===
In 2023, CBD CBN began serving infused food and drinks in Edmonton, Alberta.

==== United States ====
In 2018, USA Today said more restaurants in the U.S. were offering menus with cannabidiol (CBD)-infused options. The trade publication Nation's Restaurant News said, "A few chefs in the 10 states, and the District of Columbia ... have thrown pot-laced dinners. Those meals are generally held offsite, and the edible marijuana products are provided by staff from licensed dispensaries, and guests have to add it themselves". The same publication said in 2019, "Restaurants are taking their relationship with hemp to the next level by adding CBD or cannabinoids to dishes."

The Original Cannabis Café, established as Lowell Cafe in West Hollywood, California in late 2019, was the "first restaurant to legally sell pot for on-site consumption" in the United States. Fried, a fast casual restaurant in St. Louis with CBD-infused sauces, opened in 2019. In 2022, Nashville's first cannabis restaurant began offering "legal, hemp-derived THC-infused condiments, desserts and mocktails", and the opening of Wild Montrose marked Houston's "first entirely legal cannabis-infused dining experience".

In 2023, the American cannabis magazine High Times said, "there's a niche in the edibles industry that's continuing to grow: cannabis dining events. While there are still many limitations to cannabis infused dining, such as restrictive laws about public consumption or a lack of approved consumption lounges, many successful chef-led dining experiences are putting spotlight both on cannabis as an ingredient, as well as the consumer enjoying unique dishes infused with the herb." In 2023, Hi Flora! opened as Minnesota's first THC restaurant, and the San Antonio soul food restaurant MxiCanna Cafe gives patrons the option of adding drops of delta-8. In Houston, Ninfa's debuted a cannabis-infused margarita on April 20, 2024.

== Industry impact ==
In 2014, Nation's Restaurant News said, "pot tourism is inevitable, and the marketing possibilities are substantial for restaurants targeting visitors with the munchies".

In 2018, The Denver Post said higher wages in the cannabis industry were "eating into restaurant hiring pool". In Maine, restaurants were reportedly losing workers to the cannabis industry in 2019.

== Legal status ==
In 2023, Montgomery County health officials warned restaurants in Maryland not to sell cannabis-infused drinks or food, and Gov. Gavin Newsom vetoed a bill to legalize Amsterdam-style cannabis cafes in California.

== See also ==
- Cannabis edible
- Happy pizza
