= Cannabis and Judaism =

Role of cannabis in Judaism

There is debate that cannabis may have been used ritually in ancient Judaism, and the use of cannabis continues to be a controversial topic in modern Judaism.

== Theories on ancient use ==
It has been generally held by academics specializing in the archaeology and paleobotany of Ancient Israel, and those specializing in the lexicography of the Hebrew Bible, that cannabis is not documented or mentioned in early Judaism. Against this, some popular writers have argued that there is evidence for religious use of cannabis in the Hebrew Bible, although this hypothesis and some of the specific case studies (e.g., John Allegro in relation to Qumran, 1970) have been "widely dismissed as erroneous". However, in 2020, it was announced that cannabis residue had been found on the Israelite sanctuary altar at Tel Arad, suggesting that cannabis was a part of some Israelite rituals at the time.

The primary advocate of a religious use of cannabis plant in early Judaism was Sula Benet (1936), who claimed that the plant keneh bosem קְנֵה-בֹשֶׂם mentioned five times in the Hebrew Bible, and used in the holy anointing oil of the Book of Exodus, was in fact cannabis, although lexicons of Hebrew and dictionaries of plants of the Bible such as by Michael Zohary (1985), Hans Arne Jensen (2004) and James A. Duke (2010) and others identify the plant in question as either Acorus calamus or Cymbopogon citratus.

According to those theories that hold that cannabis was present in Ancient Israelite society, a variant of hashish is held to have been present.

== Modern era ==
In the United States, the Jewish population is over-represented among the recreational cannabis using population. The reasons for this are thought to be their urban pattern of residence, the disproportionate association of Jewish residents in the academic milieu of the city as well as its avant-garde movements, and that Jewish families are thought to be less authoritarian and more tolerant toward "intellectual experimentation".

In Canada, especially in Toronto, differences between Jews and Christians with regard to attitudes toward cannabis usage were detected in the high school population, in which surveys show that more than twice as many Jewish students have used cannabis as Catholic ones.

In a 1973 opinion, Orthodox rabbi Moshe Feinstein stated that cannabis was not permitted under Jewish law, due to its harmful effects. In 2013, Orthodox rabbi Efraim Zalmanovich stated that medical, but not recreational, cannabis is permitted.

In 2016, Belarusian-Israeli rabbi Chaim Kanievsky declared that medicinal cannabis was kosher for Passover. In January 2016, the Orthodox Union certified some medical cannabis products made by Vireo as kosher, their first medical cannabis certification.

In the United States, the Jewish Social Policy Action Network in Philadelphia and Rabbi Eric Cytrin of Temple Beth El in Harrisburg, have supported medical legalization efforts for cannabis in Pennsylvania.

In December 2023, the Rabbinical Assembly Committee on Jewish Law and Standards, a body related to Conservative Judaism, issued the first teshuva on cannabis use, finding "overwhelming halachic support" for medical cannabis, and some support for non-medical use as well.

== Kashrut ==
If smoked, under normal circumstances, there is no reason cannabis would not be kosher, although some rabbis apply this only to medical cannabis, not recreational usage. On Shabbat and holidays, smoking cannabis would be forbidden because lighting fires are prohibited. If cannabis is "eaten", as cannabis edibles are, there may be small insects inside which are not kosher, so it is recommended to only use brands that are certified as kosher. For cannabis grown in Israel, the plants must observe Shmittah, but this does not apply to cannabis from elsewhere. Some Jews hold THC gummies, produced with the correct chametz-free ingredients other than cannabis, to be kosher for Passover.
