= List of rulings by Moshe Feinstein =

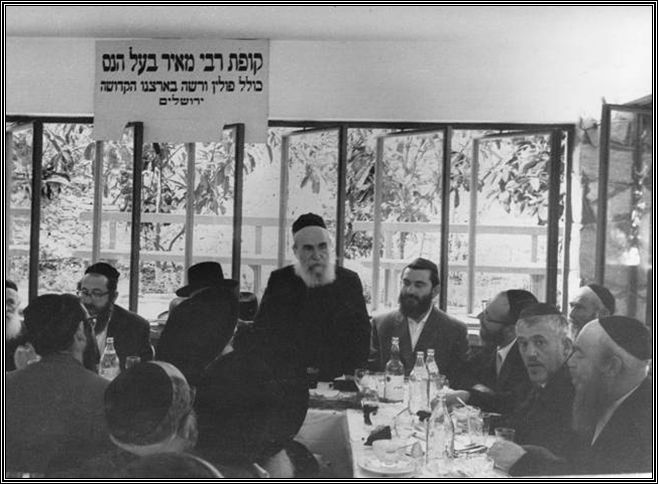
Rabbi Moshe Feinstein (standing, center)

The following is a list of notable halachic rulings by Rabbi Moshe Feinstein, the foremost halachic authority of the late 20th century in the United States; Responsa in Igrot Moshe are cited in parentheses.

- Artificial insemination from a non-Jewish donor (EH I:10,71, II:11, IV:32.5) (He rules it permissible but does not encourage it)
- Ascending the Temple Mount nowadays (OH II:113)
- Cosmetic surgery (He allows it in extraordinary circumstances) (HM II:66)
- Bat Mitzvah for girls (He does not allow it in a synagogue, but allows it as a meal) (OH I:104 (1956), OH II:97 (1959), OH IV:36)
- Brain death as an indication of death under Jewish law. (YD II:146,174, III:132, IV:54) However, this is disputed.
- Cholov Yisroel Permitted reliance (at least under extenuating circumstances, such as if no Cholov Yisroel milk is available) on U.S. government agency supervision in ensuring that milk was reliably kosher, and it is as if Jews had personally witnessed it (YD I:47). This was a highly controversial ruling disputed by prominent peers of Feinstein.
- Cheating (he forbids it) for the N.Y. Regents exams (HM II:30)
- Commemorating the Holocaust, Yom ha-Shoah (YD IV:57.11) (He opposes it)
- Conservative Judaism, including its clergy and schools (e. g., YD II:106–107) (No hiring Conservative clergy in Orthodox settings, but in a desperate situation it is permissible)
- Donating blood for pay (HM I:103) (Permissible)
- Education of girls (e. g., YD II:109, YD II:113 YD III:87.2) (Women can stay to hear a Dvar Torah, at least at a secular meeting, women cannot learn Mishnah apart from Pirkei Avot)
- End-of-life medical care
- Eruv projects in New York City
- Hazardous medical operations
- Heart transplantation (YD 2:174.3) (initially prohibited, allegedly reversed later)
- Labor union and related employment privileges (e. g., HM I:59)
- Mehitza (esp. OH I:39) (Should be 18 tefachim, roughly 4 feet 8 inches)
- Mixed-seating on a subway or other public transportation (EH II:14) (No prohibition in extenuating circumstances)
- Psychiatric care, specifically talk therapy, from heretics (YD II:57) (One should not go)
- Separation of conjoined twins who were fused all the way from the shoulder to the pelvis and shared one heart. It is during this case that C. Everett Koop, the 13th Surgeon General of the United States, said "The ethics and morals involved in this decision are too complex for me. I believe they are too complex for you as well. Therefore I referred it to an old rabbi on the Lower East Side of New York. He is a great scholar, a saintly individual. He knows how to answer such questions. When he tells me, I too will know." (Permitted)
- Shaking hands between men and women (OH 1:113, EH I:56; EH IV:32) (Generally prohibited, some say permissible if a woman extends her hand first but don’t rely on that, don’t judge people for holding otherwise)
- Smoking marijuana (YD III:35) (Strictly forbidden)
- Tay–Sachs disease fetus abortion, esp. in debate with Eliezer Waldenberg
- Smoking
- Veal raised in factory conditions (EH IV, 92:2) (Cannot be eaten or sold for profit)
- Remarriage after Holocaust (EH I:44) (Permissible as long as there is no reason to think there is trickery)

== Bibliography ==
- Feinstein, Moshe; Moshe David Tendler (1996). Responsa of Rav Moshe Feinstein: translation and commentary. [translated and annotated] by Moshe Dovid Tendler. Hoboken, NJ: KTAV Publishing House. ISBN 0-88125-444-4. LCCN 96011212. OCLC 34476198.
- Halperin, Mordechai (2006). "The Theological and Halakhic Legitimacy of Medical Therapy and Enhancement". In Noam Zohar (ed.). Quality of life in Jewish bioethics. Lanham, MD: Lexington Books. ISBN 0-7391-1446-8. LCCN 2005029443. OCLC 62078279.
- Joseph, Norma Baumel (1995). Separate Spheres: Women in the Responsa of Rabbi Moses Feinstein (PhD thesis). Concordia University.
