= Tree Fern Dell and Lily Pond =

Garden in San Francisco, California

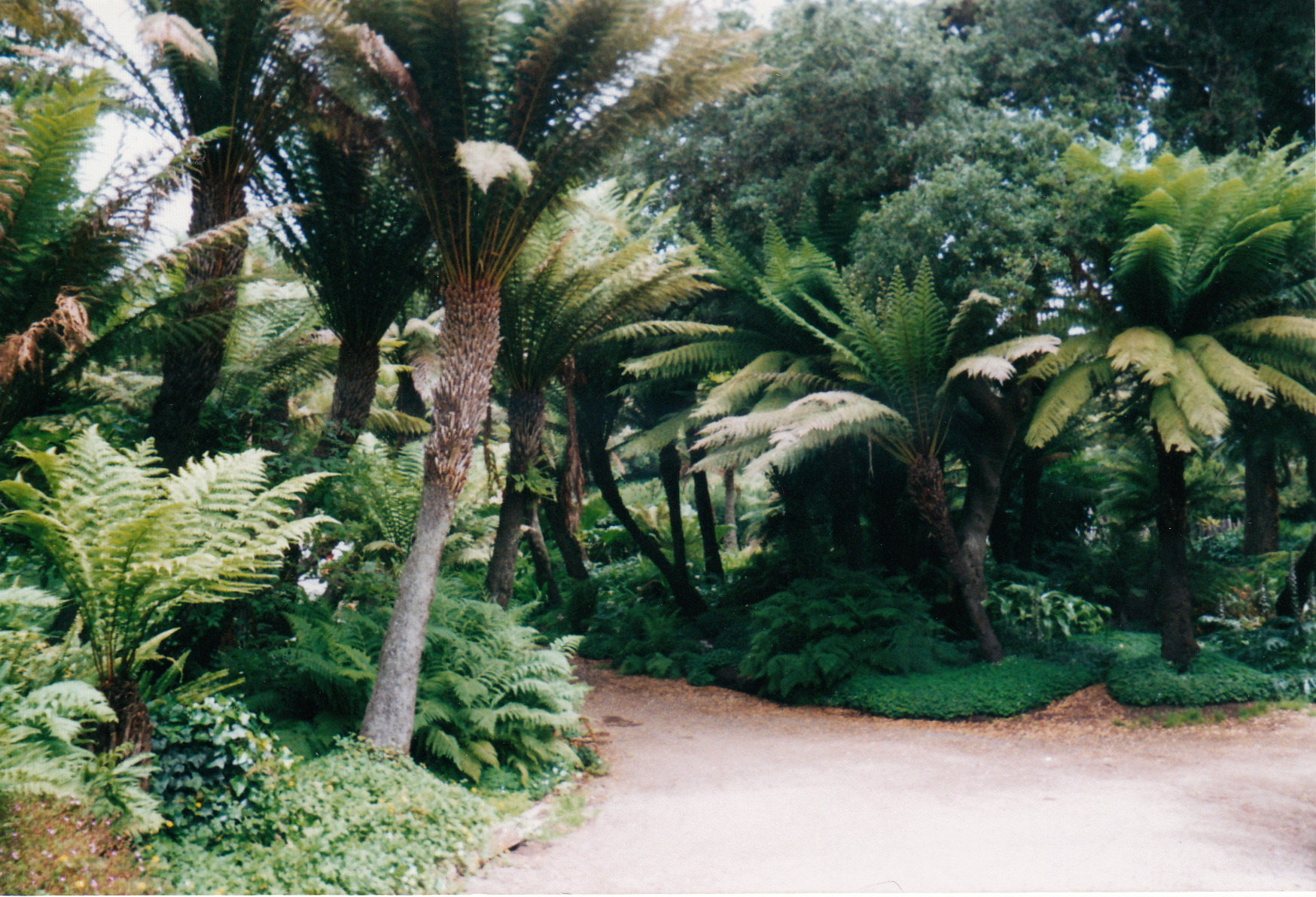
- Tree ferns in the Tree Fern Dell
- Interactive map of Tree Fern Dell and Lily Pond
- Type: Botanical garden landscape and ornamental pond
- Location: Golden Gate Park, San Francisco, California, United States
- Coordinates: 37.7716°N 122.4623°W
- Created: c. 1890s (Tree Fern Dell); 1902 (Lily Pond)
- Designer: John McLaren
- Operator: San Francisco Recreation and Parks Department
- Status: Open year-round

The Tree Fern Dell and the adjacent Lily Pond are landscape features in Golden Gate Park in San Francisco, California. Developed between the 1890s and the early 20th century, the area contains one of the park's largest historic collections of tree ferns and an ornamental pond constructed on the site of a former quarry.

The landscape was developed during the tenure of park superintendent John McLaren, who oversaw the botanical development of Golden Gate Park for more than five decades.

== Tree Fern Dell ==
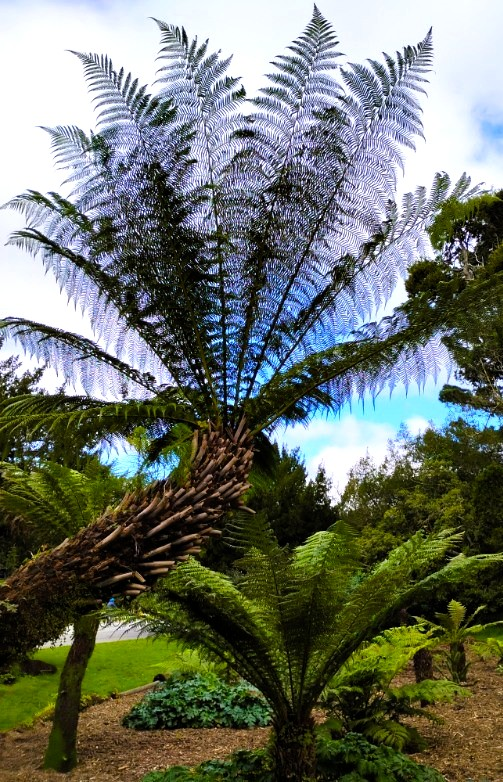
Golden Gate Park Tree Fern Dell April, 2025

The Tree Fern Dell lies along John F. Kennedy Drive near the San Francisco Conservatory of Flowers. The garden is characterized by dense plantings of tree ferns and ferns, growing among other species within a shaded ravine landscape.

=== History ===
Tree ferns were introduced to Golden Gate Park in the late 19th century during the Victorian fern-collecting trend known as pteridomania.

Historical accounts indicate that some of the earliest tree fern specimens were sent from New Zealand to park superintendent John McLaren around 1889. Early plantings were established near the present site of the Tree Fern Dell.

Annual reports of the San Francisco Board of Park Commissioners from the 1890s document fern plantings and the construction of landscaped rock gardens near the Conservatory of Flowers. One early hillside planting known as "The Rockery" was constructed with stone transported from outside the park and planted with ferns and other shade-tolerant plants.

By the early 20th century, the area had developed into a dense planting of tree ferns, primarily Dicksonia antarctica.

=== Plant collections ===
Additional species were introduced between approximately 1912 and 1920, including:

- Dicksonia squarrosa
- Sphaeropteris medullaris
- Sphaeropteris cooperi

Some specimens were acquired following the Panama–Pacific International Exposition in 1915, when international exhibitors donated plants used in their displays.

Tree ferns were also planted in other parts of Golden Gate Park during the early 20th century, including near Mallard Lake, de Laveaga Dell (now the site of the National AIDS Memorial Grove), and Huntington Falls.

=== Environmental changes ===
Over time, the Tree Fern Dell experienced plant losses due to drought, freezing temperatures, falling canopy trees, and invasive plant species. In 2024, a volunteer team, "Friends of the Tree Fern Dell and Lily Pond," working with the San Francisco Recreation and Parks Department, began a multi-year restoration of the Tree Fern Dell and the hillside adjacent to the Lily Pond.

== Lily Pond ==
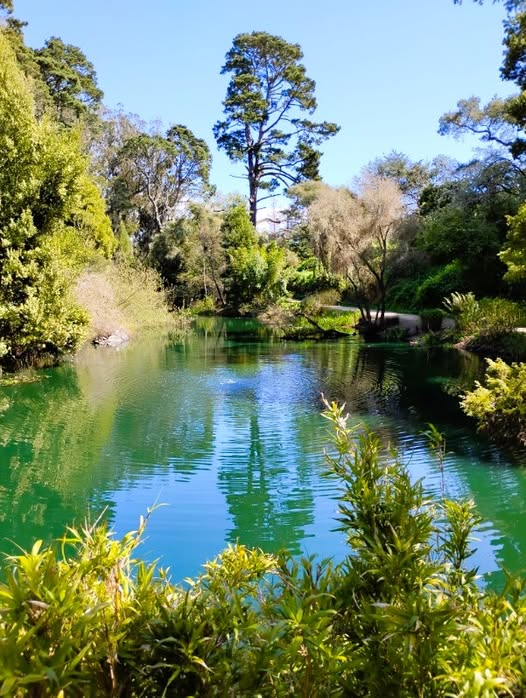
Golden Gate Park Lily Pond, March 2025

Within the Tree Fern Dell, the Lily Pond lies between John F. Kennedy Drive and Nancy Pelosi Drive. The pond occupies the site of a former chert quarry opened in 1871 to supply stone used in park road construction.

After quarry operations ceased, the excavation was converted into an ornamental pond in 1902. The pond was created by packing clay into a basin at the base of the quarry wall. Because it has no natural water source, the pond requires periodic refilling to maintain water levels.

Early names for the water feature included "Hobo Lake", "Quarry Lake", and "Duck Pond" before the name Lily Pond became widely used. Originally the pond contained ducks, turtles, and water lilies, and peacocks were introduced to the surrounding landscape as ornamental wildlife.

=== Ecological issues and restoration ===
During the early 21st century the pond experienced ecological problems including extensive duckweed growth and the presence of invasive, non-native African clawed frogs (Xenopus). After several attempts at removal, the pond was drained and restored by the California Department of Fish and Wildlife in 2016.

== Tree ferns around the pond ==
Historically, large tree ferns grew along the slopes overlooking the Lily Pond. Mid-20th-century reports described specimens reaching approximately 25 feet (7.6 m) in height with fronds up to 16 feet (4.9 m) long. Many of these specimens have since died, leaving large trunks visible along the hillside among the tree ferns now being restored.

== In popular culture ==
The Tree Fern Dell was used as a filming location for the science fiction film Star Trek II: The Wrath of Khan (1982), where it represented the planet Genesis in the film’s final sequence.

During the 1960s counterculture era, the area was also informally nicknamed “Mescaline Grove” by visitors from nearby Hippie Hill.

== See also ==
- Golden Gate Park
- San Francisco Conservatory of Flowers
- National AIDS Memorial Grove (de Laveaga Dell)
