= Steve Berke =

Tennis player (born 1981)

- Born: Steve Ryan Berke; May 5, 1981 (age 45); North Miami, Florida
- Education: Yale University
- Occupations: Church founder; Politician; Rapper; Entertainer; Activist; YouTuber/Video director
- Known for: Founding the International Church of Cannabis; Running for mayor of Miami Beach; Making parody viral videos; Being a college tennis star; Promoting cannabis
- Website: www.steveberke.com

Steve Ryan Berke (born 5 May 1981) is a co-founder of the International Church of Cannabis, two-time candidate for mayor of Miami Beach, cannabis activist, rapper, YouTuber, entrepreneur, and former All-American tennis player.

As a college tennis player, Berke gained All-America honors and the Ivy League Player of the Year award at Yale University. After sustaining a career-ending injury on the professional tennis tour, Berke turned to medical marijuana as a pain reliever and became a cannabis activist. Moving from stand-up comedy to YouTube, he made several viral videos, most prominently "Pot Shop", a rap parody of "Thrift Shop," which garnered over 15 million views. He was a candidate for mayor of Miami Beach on two occasions, in 2011 and 2013, attracting international media attention with his unorthodox campaigns. He founded Bang Holdings, a digital media company that specializes in cannabis advertising. In 2017, Berke was one of the founders of the International Church of Cannabis, a religious organization that regards cannabis as a sacrament.

== Life and career ==
=== Tennis player ===
Steve Berke started playing in tennis tournaments at the age of 7. At age 14, he won his first national championship and represented the United States in the World Team Championships in Japan against fellow competitors Roger Federer and Lleyton Hewitt. When he was 16 years old, he represented the United States again, along with Andy Roddick and Mardy Fish, making it to the quarterfinals of the Orange Bowl. He left home to live and train at the Nick Bollettieri tennis academy in Bradenton, Florida.

As a junior player, Berke won four Florida state championships and two national championships. In 1999 he was ranked No. 10 in the nation in the 18 and under age group and top 50 in the ITF world junior rankings.

Berke went to Yale University and played number 1 for the tennis team. He went undefeated all season in his sophomore year (2001) and then made it to the quarterfinals of the NCAA tournament as the first unranked male player to do so. Berke finished with a 19–5 record, earning All-America honors, Ivy League Player of the Year, and first team All-Ivy. He was nationally ranked No. 45 in singles by the International Tennis Association in the preseason. He finished with a national singles ranking of No. 74 and doubles ranking of No. 29. Berke was expected to play No. 1 for Yale, but after completing the fall semester in 2003, he transferred to the University of California, Berkeley, where he repeated as an All-American. He received his degree from Yale later that year, and subsequently entered the professional tennis tour. But in one of his first tournaments, he severely herniated two spinal discs.

=== Reality TV and comedy ===
During his rehabilitation, Berke attended a casting call for Richard Branson's entrepreneurial television competition The Rebel Billionaire: Branson's Quest for the Best, which featured contestants racing the globe to compete to become CEO of Branson's Virgin Group. Berke competed and came in eighth, featuring in all but one episode. At the wrap party, Branson introduced Berke to marijuana. Before he was voted off the show, Sir Richard Branson mentioned that Steve had openly stated "I will lie, cheat, and steal for you." Off the show, Berke tried to return to the tennis tour with drug prescriptions and spinal injections, but experienced side effects that made him turn to marijuana as a pain reliever and obtain a license from California to smoke medical cannabis.

Berke spent a few months setting up a business selling the Moosh Pillow, a neck support for airline travelers that he had pitched during one episode of The Rebel Billionaire. When it didn't take off, he got a job in real estate management. In 2009, Berke started showing up at open-mike nights at Miami comedy clubs. Those turned into opening slots for comics such as Pauly Shore and Bill Burr. In 2010, he spent a summer in Los Angeles shooting music video parodies and posting them on YouTube.

=== YouTube parody videos ===
Berke has made a dozen YouTube parody videos. His first YouTube success was a pro-marijuana remake of Eminem's "Love the Way You Lie." In the video called "Should Be Legalized," Berke rapped with Dutch model and singer Charlotte Bruyn. It became a viral video, getting 400,000 hits before YouTube rated it NC-17. Berke's effort attracted the attention of pro-legalization groups such as NORML.

In early 2013, Berke released his most famous video: a parody of "Thrift Shop" by Macklemore & Ryan Lewis. Called "Pot Shop," it was another song promoting the legalization of marijuana. The video featured appearances by Playboy Playmate and internet celebrity Amanda Cerny and a short cameo from Macklemore in a show of support for the parody. In two years, "Pot Shop" had more than 14 million views on YouTube.

"You're the law that I want (Yes on 2)", a 2014 parody of the song "You're the one that I want" from Grease, interpreted by Berke and model Briley Hale, invited Florideans to vote for Amendment 2 concerning the "Florida Right to Medical Marijuana Initiative." Berke tracked down the original funhouse set from the film in a county fair in Decatur, Texas. The video went viral, but it was removed by YouTube due to a complaint from Warner/Chappell Music, the original song's publisher. Berke appealed and the video was eventually reinstated.

=== Miami Beach mayoral candidacies ===
In 2011, Berke decided to run for mayor of Miami Beach as a candidate of the "After Party." He ran a tongue-in-cheek campaign as a rapper turned unconventional mayoral candidate defying political norms to ascend to political power. His campaign manager was Roger Stone, who helped the campaigns of Ronald Reagan, George Bush and G. W. Bush. Stone volunteered to advise Berke at no cost. During a city commission meeting, Berke asked Mayor Matti Herrera Bower to resign and brought internet celebrity Sexy Sax Man to play at the meeting. The video of this stunt has over 2 million views. His drive to decriminalize marijuana gathered 9,000 signatures to get the issue on the ballot. His campaign events attracted celebrities like LeBron James, Dwyane Wade, Rob Gronkowski, and Reggie Bush.

Although it was launched largely as a joke, Berke's campaign turned into a serious effort that drew national media attention. In the end, Berke finished second to Herrera Bower, garnering 29 percent of the vote on election day.

For his second run for mayor in 2013, Berke ran a more serious campaign, assembling a team and crafting a platform based on a new public transportation system. Berke also made a Kickstarter campaign to raise money to make a documentary that would focus on his campaign and the political processes in Miami Beach. He eventually sold his documentary to MTV2. He created a platform he called "2020 Vision," unveiling a six-year plan to address police misconduct, flooding, and pension liabilities. The centerpiece of the plan was the SkyLink, a $100-million cable car system strung across Biscayne Bay, linking Miami Beach to the mainland and addressing traffic and parking problems. His idea was taken up by Sir Richard Branson, who expressed his interest in sponsoring the SkyLink as a public-private partnership. The 2013 ballot included a straw ballot referendum on the issue of legalizing marijuana.

The four-way race was eventually won by Philip Levine.

=== Bang Holdings ===
After his second election loss, Berke received offers from marijuana companies that wanted to be included in his YouTube videos. This happened because the cannabis industry lacked marketing channels, since major media providers restricted online marijuana advertising. Berke decided to create a social media network allowing advertisers to target the marijuana community and industry. He founded Bang Holdings and became its CEO. The company is publicly traded under the symbol "BXNG." Its subsidiary, Bang Digital Media, provides brand management, cannabis-related digital content and social influencer-based marketing for the cannabis industry. By the end of 2016, Bang was running one of the leading cannabis-related Facebook pages, as well as sites on Instagram, Snapchat and YouTube, with a dozen influencers with 250,000 to 10 million followers each.

Bang Digital Media attracted attention outside the marijuana market in 2016, when it used the then-presidential candidate Donald Trump as the test case for its chatbots, which were the first AI personalities to sell products to humans via Facebook Messenger. The chatbot called "The Donald," offering a digital download of the U.S. Constitution, had a Facebook page with more than 400,000 followers.

=== The International Church of Cannabis ===
In 2015, Berke was in Denver for the Cannabis Cup on the 4/20 weekend when he noticed a church that was for sale. Berke bought the church with his parents, originally with the intention to turn it into condos or rental apartments. Then his friends suggested he keep it as a church and build a community around the spiritual benefits of cannabis.

Berke and others established Elevation Ministries, the religious nonprofit organization behind the church, in September 2016. Then they founded the International Church of Cannabis as a religious organization using cannabis as a sacrament and adhering to no specific dogma.

The Denver church was converted into the chapel headquarters and opened its doors on April 20, 2017. An amendment banning cannabis consumption in churches was submitted to the Colorado House of Representatives on the same day and rejected as an unconstitutional restriction on religion.

The Church is open to the public and offers a daily light show and meditation called "Beyond" which has become the highest rated tourist attraction in Denver. Beyond is a guided meditation that utilizes cutting edge lights and lasers which are 3D mapped to the mural on the ceiling of the church.

=== Munchie's Pizza Club ===
Berke opened Munchie's Pizza Club, a dog-friendly "1980s style pizzeria" in April 2021 in Fort Lauderdale, Florida, with the kitchen being supervised by Fort Lauderdale based executive chef, Todd Erickson, the first Floridian chef to beat Bobby Flay on the Food Network television show "Beat Bobby Flay." The restaurant was named after Berke's service dog Munchie, who is also a TikTok star.
