= Stoner Jesus Bible Study =

Stoner Jesus Bible Study is a Centennial, Colorado Bible study group founded by Deb Button in May 2014. As of 2015, the group was led by Pastor Greg. Button brought together a group of around 20 or 30 individuals through social media. The group includes people of many faiths or no faith at all. Button, who calls herself a conservative, says she voted against Colorado legalization of marijuana initiatives before founding the group.

== Criticism ==
Steve Rudd in has stated in Drugs and the Bible: E, Shrooms, Cocaine, Crack, Marijuana that using "illicit" drugs is a form of sorcery. Jennifer LeClaire writing for Charisma magazine called the group "blasphemous".

== See also ==
- First Church of Cannabis
