= Philadelphia Temple of Hemp and Cannabis =

Church in Philadelphia, Pennsylvania, USA

Religion
- Affiliation: Rastafari

Location
- Municipality: Philadelphia
- State: Pennsylvania
- Country: United States
- Interactive map of Philadelphia Temple of Hemp and Cannabis
- Coordinates: 39.9837°N 75.1256°W

Philadelphia Temple of Hemp and Cannabis (also called Philly THC) is a church in Philadelphia, Pennsylvania.

The church interior features Rastafarian images, including a mural of Haile Selassie.

It may be the first space for public consumption of cannabis in America east of the Mississippi River, following "a handful" in Denver and San Francisco around 2019. It may circumvent the state's laws against public smoking by offering "ceramic-tipped electronic devices" for consumption via dry herb vaporizer on premises.

See extended article on Cannabis in Pennsylvania which notes that recreational use is still illegal but that enforcement may be less severe than previously.

The venue has held other public events such as a public reading of Cannabis: The Illegalization of Weed in America by its author, Box Brown.
