= Anti-420 public service announcement campaigns =

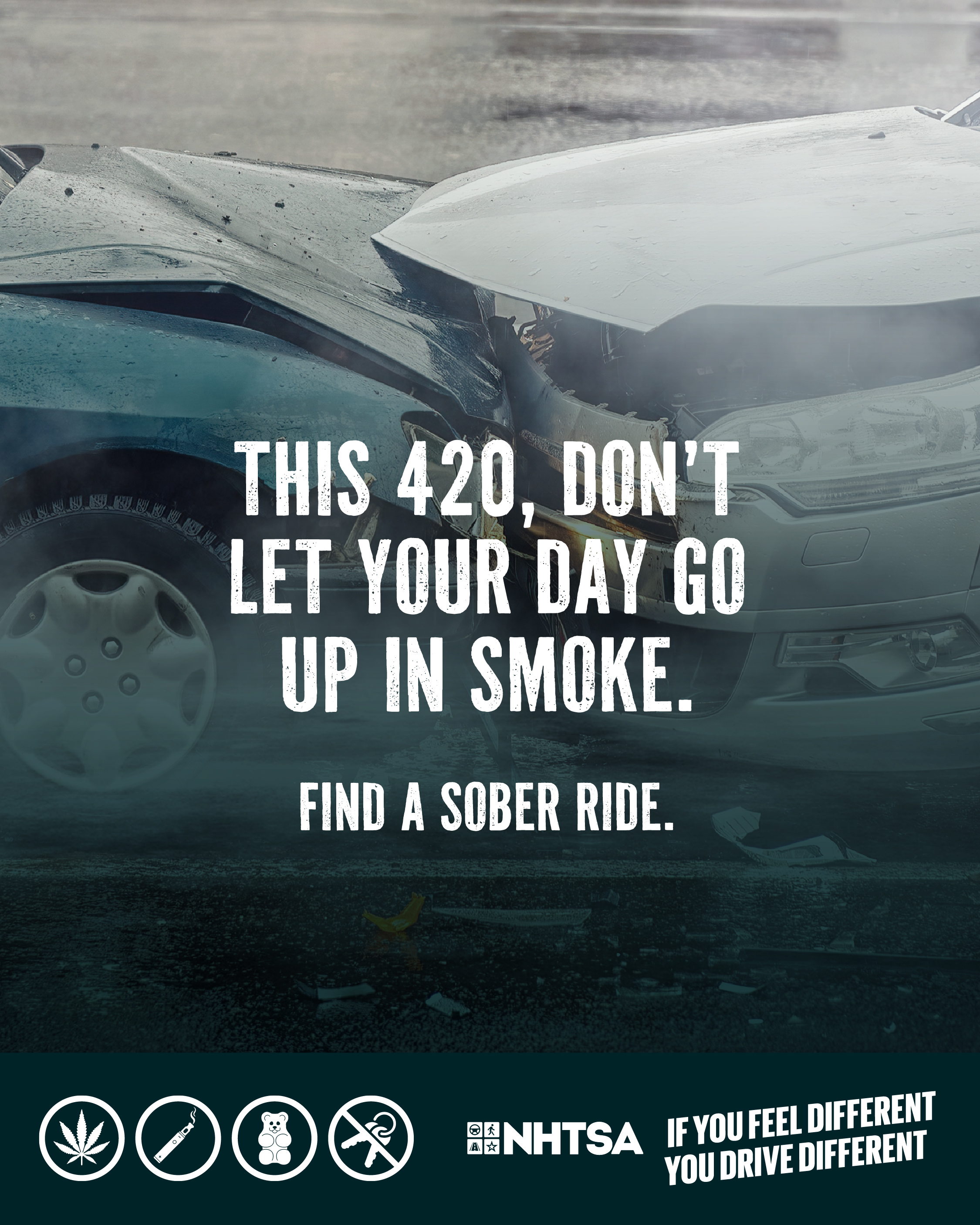
Anti-420 public service announcement from U.S. National Highway Traffic Safety Administration (2025)

Anti-420 public service announcement campaigns have included efforts by the U.S. federal government and regional groups to disseminate negative messages about cannabis and the unofficial 420 cannabis holiday.

In 2026, ahead of the 420 cannabis holiday, the U.S. Office of National Drug Control Policy funded a number of anti-420 public service announcements (PSAs). Some of the PSAs were educational in nature concerning cannabis and impaired driving. In other cases the effort was dubbed by the government ANTI-420 Day. The ANTI-420 Day campaign includes cash prizes for students who create PSAs, awarded by a nonprofit group "Johnny's Ambassadors" partnering with DEA who promoted the campaign. The group is named after a student who they say "died by suicide after becoming psychotic from high-THC concentrates".

In Southern California, an anti-drug group encouraged students to make anti-420 remix PSA content on social media. The project may have started with a 2019 or earlier in-person "420 Remix" event sponsored by the same group at a Vista, California amusement center.

In 2026, Virginia Cannabis Control Authority ran "a new PSA campaign focused around the 4/20 cannabis holiday [that] depicted 'bad combination' scenarios such as a young woman with a balloon surrounded by cacti". Other driving-related PSAs with 420 themes have been conducted in Kansas, and in Colorado, both PSAs and state transportation department outreach at a Denver Civic Center Park 420 festival have occurred.
