= Hippie Hill =

Landscape feature in San Francisco

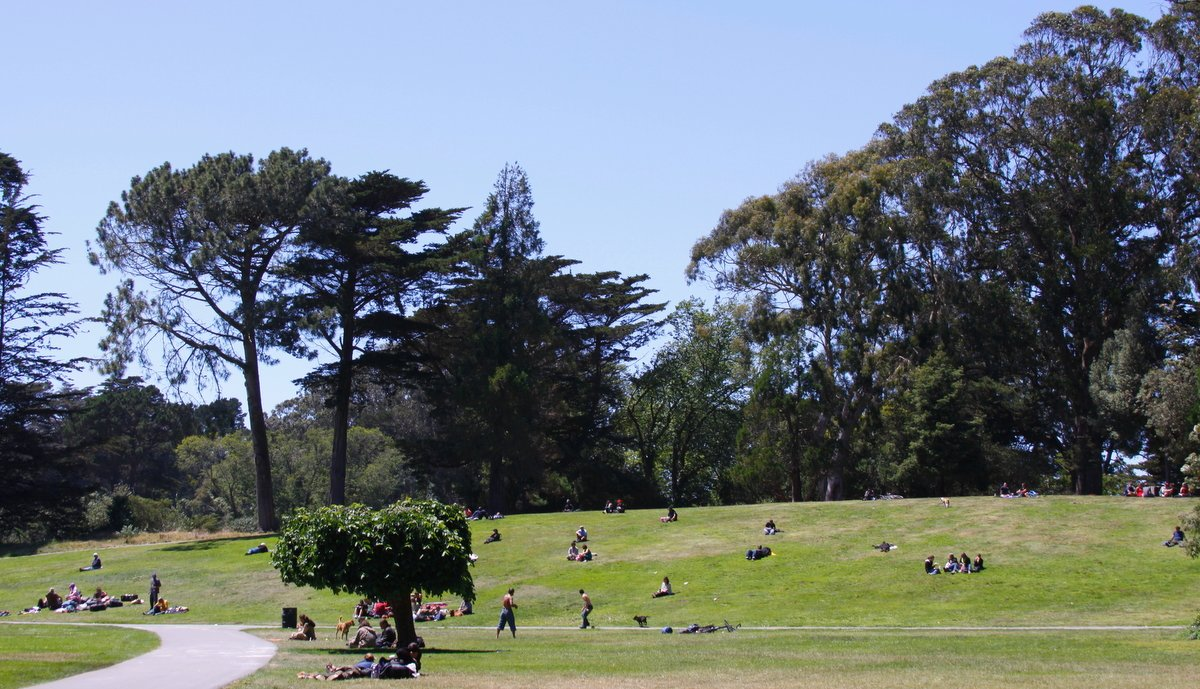
- Sunbathers on Hippie Hill, July 2009
- Interactive map of Hippie Hill
- Location: Golden Gate Park, San Francisco, California, United States
- Coordinates: 37°46′14.35″N 122°27′28.14″W
- Operator: San Francisco Recreation & Parks Department
- Open: 24 hours
- Status: open
- Designation: public

Hippie Hill is a small hill and historic area within Golden Gate Park, San Francisco. It is situated between the Conservatory of Flowers and Haight Street. Positioned east of the Golden Gate Park tennis courts, this green space features a gentle sloping lawn located off Kezar Drive. It provides views overlooking Robin Williams Meadow and is bordered by Eucalyptus and Oak trees on either side. The hill is also home to several uncommon tree species, including coast banksia, titoki, turpentine, and cow-itch. While it used to host 4/20 celebrations, it continues to host spontaneous drum circles.

== History ==
Hippie Hill holds historical significance within San Francisco's cultural landscape, notably as a focal point during the 1967 Summer of Love counterculture movement. Its proximity to Haight Street, a central hub for this movement, led to its frequent use as a gathering space. Activities such as music performances, LSD and marijuana consumption, and the expression of hippie ideals took place on the hill. Over time, concerns arose about public behavior, including open sexuality, nude dancing, panhandling, and littering.

The hill also became a musical platform, hosting free performances by renowned artists like Janis Joplin, the Grateful Dead, Jefferson Airplane, and George Harrison. Hippie Hill facilitated the open use of drugs and self-expression, as law enforcement adopted a permissive stance. This space played a central role in the counterculture's activities during that era. Presently, weekends see the emergence of spontaneous drum circles, where individuals gather to create rhythmic beats for extended periods.

== Marijuana ==
Despite occasional police interventions in the park, the SFPD has historically adopted a permissive stance toward activities on the hill. This leniency originated from the Summer of Love when law enforcement was overwhelmed by the situation's magnitude, leading to a certain level of tolerance. In 2014, then-Supervisor London Breed pointed out that smoking in city parks remained legally prohibited, but San Francisco had a historical precedent of disregarding such infractions during official or unofficial events. 4/20 events at Hippie Hill in 2024 and 2025 were cancelled due to a lack of city resources, though a number of people still showed-up to celebrate.

== Drum circle ==
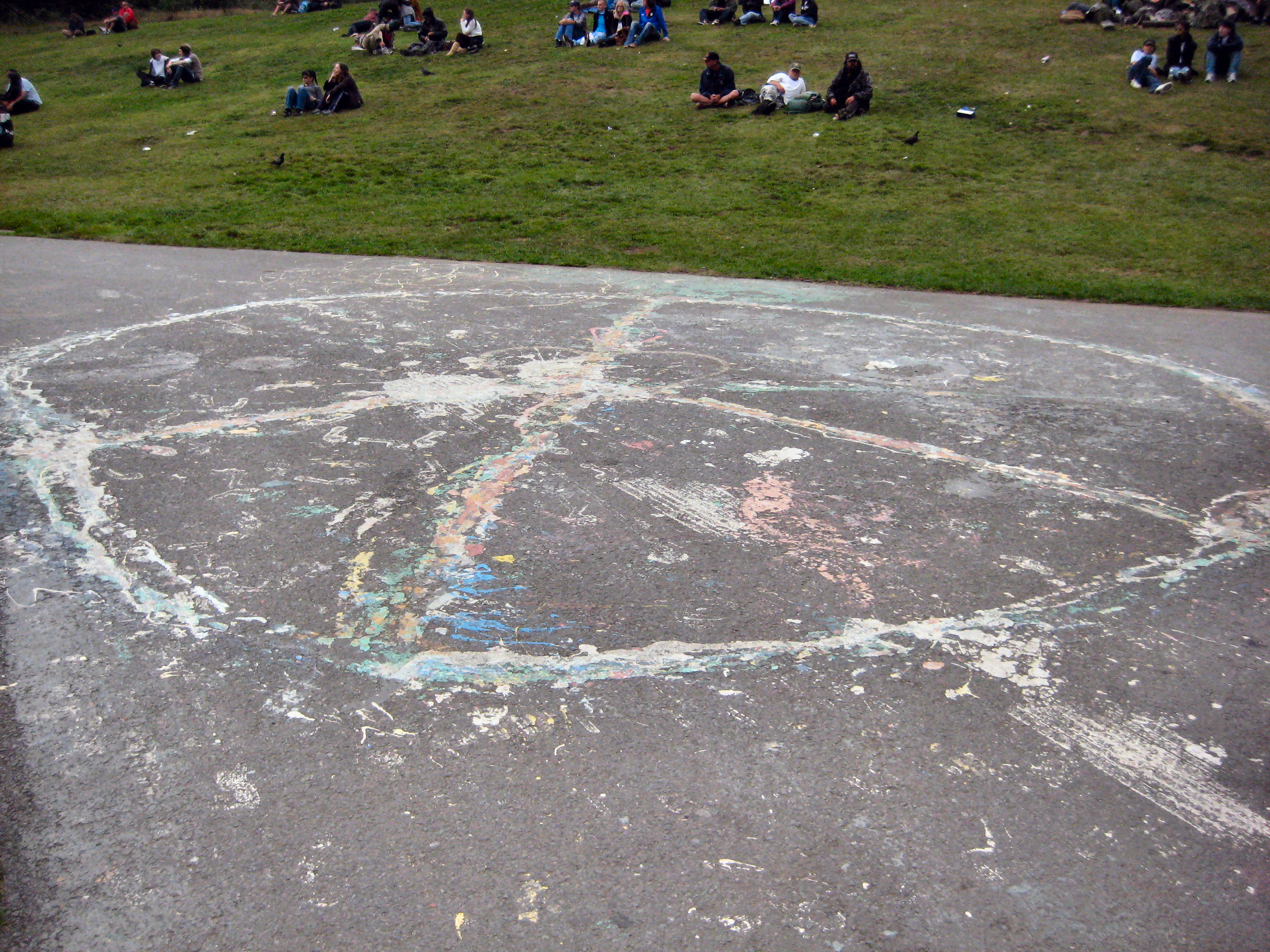
Peace sign on the path under Hippie Hill where drum circle forms

Since the 1960s, a drum circle that anyone can join has formed at Hippie Hill on weekend days, with dozens joining when the weather is nice. The drumming can be heard throughout the eastern part of the park and nearby Panhandle. Sometimes participants bring instruments such as didgeridoo, accordion, electric guitar, xylophone and maracas in addition to drums like bongos.
