= Igros Moshe =

Igros Moshe (Hebrew: אגרות משה, lit. 'Epistles of Moses'; Israeli/Sephardic pronunciation: Igrot Moshe) is a nine-volume series of halakhic responsa by Rabbi Moshe Feinstein. The first seven volumes were published during Feinstein's lifetime, and the last two were published posthumously in Jerusalem.

== Overview ==
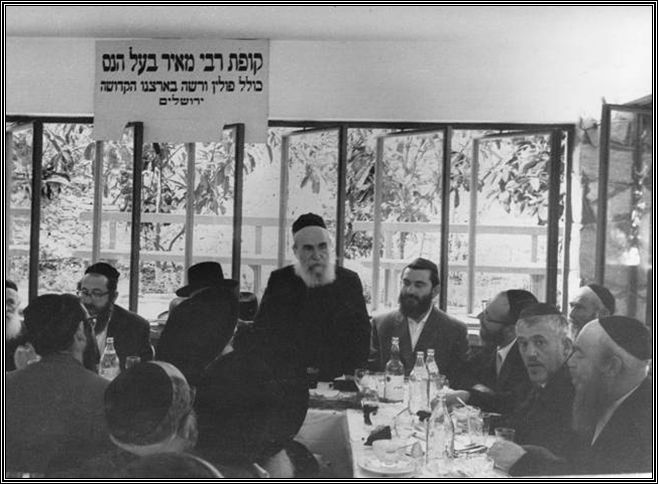
Moshe Feinstein

Moshe Feinstein was recognized during his lifetime as the posek hador, the final decisor in halakhic queries, by much of the world's Orthodox Jewish community, due to his reputation as a talmid chacham with deep knowledge in all areas of Torah. The most difficult questions were often mailed to him. In 1959, a compilation of these questions related to the laws of Orach Chaim were printed in the first volume of Igros Moshe. Later volumes were printed over the next twenty five years, with the publishing of the sixth volume in c. 1985. The remaining two volumes were published posthumously, largely based on manuscripts, with the final printing in 2011. Altogether, the series includes thousands of responsa. In addition, an index titled Yad Moshe was published, listing different ideas and where one can find relating halakhos in the Igros Moshe. His son-in-law, Rabbi David Tendler, translated some of Igros Moshe in Responsa of Rav Moshe Feinstein: translation and commentary.

== Visit from Begin ==
On Israeli Prime Minister Menachem Begin's trip to the United States in 1977, he visited Feinstein in his apartment in New York. Also present at the meeting were Yitzchak Hutner and Yaakov Kamenetsky, also senior Haredi (ultra-orthodox) rabbis in the United States. Before Begin arrived his security agents combed Feinstein's apartment for weapons or explosives that may have been planted there to harm the prime minister. Upon seeing this, Hutner said that if they were searching for explosives, they would "only find them in the writings of our host!" He was referring to the creative and novel ideas and decisions (chidushim) that Feinstein had penned in Igros Moshe.

== Depth ==
On the tenth yahrtzeit (anniversary of death) of Rabbi Feinstein, the mashgiach ruchani of Mesivtha Tifereth Jerusalem, Rabbi Chaim Ganzweig, wrote the following in The Jewish Observer:

Every halachic decision of the Rosh Yeshiva [Rabbi Feinstein], regardless of how seemingly simple or instantly rendered, was deeply rooted in sugyos haShas (the discussions recorded in the Talmud). There was no superficiality in his decisions. They were based on a deep awareness and understanding of all relevant Talmudic discussions and their ramifications. He did not rely on "this opinion" or "that decision," nor did he automatically follow precedent; rather, the decision was the result of toil in, and depth of understanding of, the relevant Talmudic discussions at the source, following through the classic codes and the views of the great poskim.

== See also ==
- Biography of HaRav Moshe Feinstein zatsal
- List of rulings by Moshe Feinstein
- Care of the Critically Ill
