= International Church of Cannabis =

American cannabis-based religious movement

Coordinates: 39.7092°N 104.9823°W

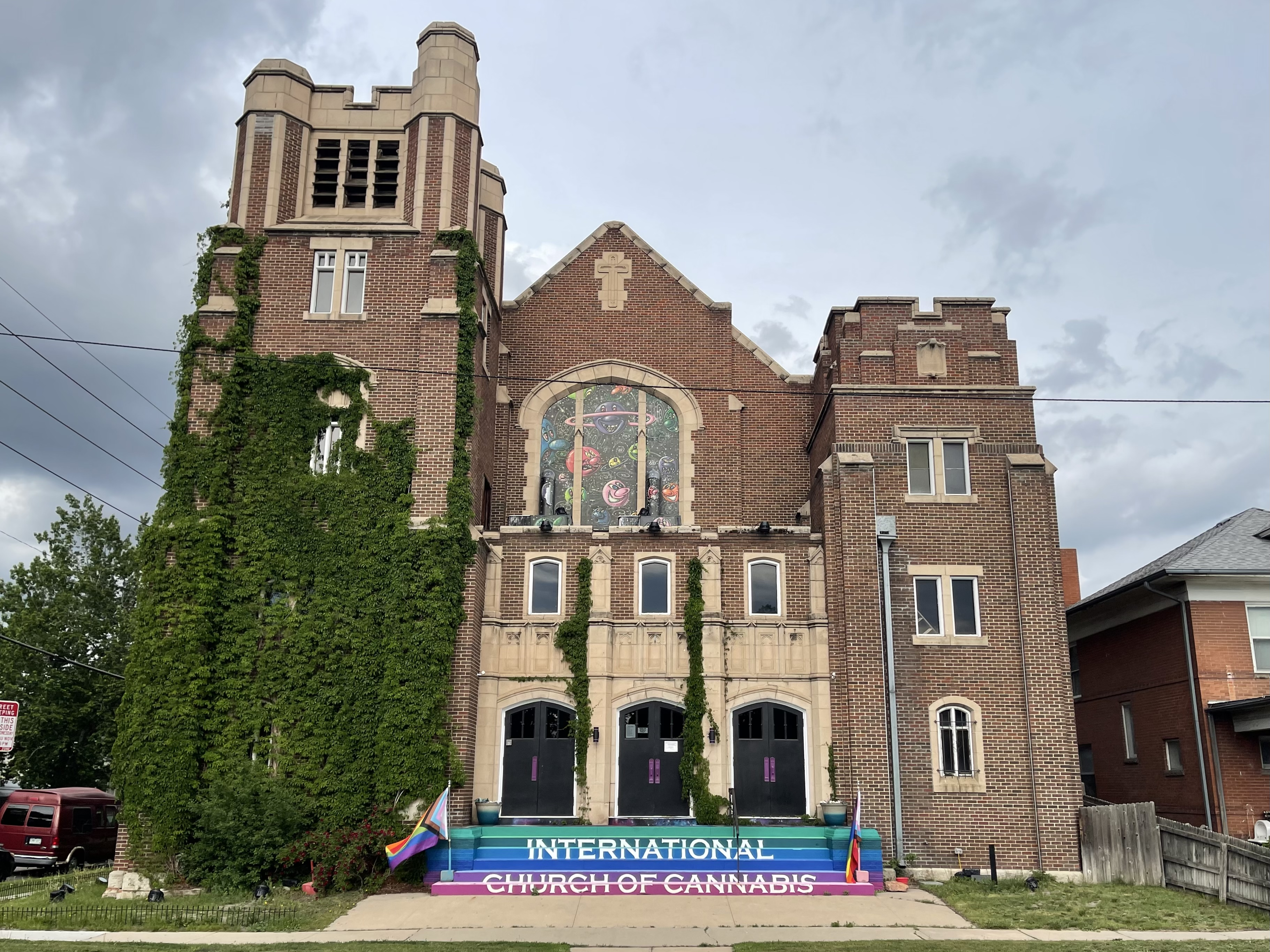
- Church building on May 26, 2025
- Type: Cannabis-based new religious movement
- Region: United States
- Headquarters: Denver, Colorado
- Origin: April 20, 2017; Denver
- Congregations: 1 (Washington Park, Denver)
- Members: 19,000 (2024)
- Official website: elevationists.org

The International Church of Cannabis is a religious organization in Denver that uses cannabis as a sacrament. Members claim the use of cannabis helps elevate people to a higher understanding of self.

The chapel headquarters, a converted old church painted by contemporary artists, opened its doors on April 20, 2017. No cannabis consumption is allowed during times the church is open to the public; celebrations of the "sacrament of cannabis" are held for members only.

== Beliefs ==
Members of the International Church of Cannabis are known as Elevationists. They ritually use "the sacred flower" of cannabis to accelerate and deepen self-discovery. A member is considered awakened when their cannabis experience becomes transcendental in nature. Elevationism claims no divine law and no unquestionable doctrine; it adheres to no specific dogma while following the Golden Rule.

Since 420 is a significant number for cannabis culture, the church opened its doors on April 20, inviting members to partake cannabis at 4:20 p.m. Celebration of the "sacrament of cannabis" is the regular church service, held each Friday. The symbol of the church is a set of interlocking triangles.

Ritual use of cannabis is not a modern invention, as it appeared in several world religions over a period of 3,000 years. The International Church of Cannabis is one of several modern religious organizations that consider cannabis a sacrament.

In May 2017 the church announced it would begin offering wedding services in a "cannabis-friendly" environment.

The Church is open to the public and offers a daily light show and meditation called "Beyond" which has become a top 10 tourist attraction in Denver. Beyond is a guided meditation that utilizes cutting edge lights and lasers which are 3D mapped to the mural on the ceiling of the church.

== Membership ==
Members of any religion can become Elevationists without the need to convert, since Elevationism is seen as a supplement rather than a replacement to existing faith. The only restriction is that persons under 21 years of age are not allowed into the church when cannabis is being burned. The church does not have a formal hierarchy.

The church's membership increased to 200 people from around 50 on the opening week after increased media attention. It allegedly grew to 500 in the subsequent two weeks. By December 2024, it had 19,000 members.

== Legal status ==
Elevation Ministries, the religious nonprofit organization behind the church, was formally established in Colorado in September 2016.

Although Colorado legalized recreational marijuana in 2012, smoking in public spaces remains banned. All ritual cannabis use at the church is by invitation only. The church does not sell marijuana. On the federal level, Elevationism is protected by constitutional religious freedom as long as it is considered an authentic religious belief.

On the day the church opened in 2017 state Representative Dan Pabon proposed banning cannabis consumption in churches. Pabon confirmed his move was inspired by the International Church of Cannabis. However, members of both parties in the House concluded it would be an unconstitutional restriction on religion; they rejected his proposal and the amendment was not formally introduced.

== Church building ==
The church is housed in a 113-year-old structure in Denver's Washington Park neighborhood: a converted Lutheran church, formerly known as Mount Calvary Apostolic Church. The church property was purchased in July 2015 by a company co-owned by church co-founder Steve Berke and his parents with the intention to turn it into apartments. However, Berke's colleagues and friends, who later became co-founding members of the church, convinced him, and eventually the company, to establish a new church in lieu of converting the building into condos. An Indiegogo campaign to fund repairs on the building raised $40,000. Renovations began July 2016.

Spanish artist Okuda San Miguel painted the colorful surrealist interior with geometric neon colors and images of animals; the artist had previously painted abandoned churches in Spain and Morocco. American artist Kenny Scharf painted the façade with graffiti-inspired murals.

In March 2017, Elevation Ministries established a two-year licensing and management agreement with Bang Digital Media, a publicly traded company founded by church co-founder Steve Berke, which does marketing work for the cannabis industry.

== See also ==
- Cannabis and religion
- Entheogen
