= Cheba Hut =

American cannabis-themed fast food chain

Cheba Hut “Toasted Subs”
- Type: Restaurant chain
- Industry: Fast Casual Restaurant
- Founded: Tempe, Arizona, 1998
- Founder: Scott Jennings
- Headquarters: Fort Collins, Colorado, United States
- Number of locations: 90 locations (August 2026)
- Area served: Arizona, Arkansas, California, Colorado, Florida, Georgia, Illinois, Iowa, Louisiana,Minnesota,Montana, New Mexico, Nebraska, Nevada, Ohio, Oklahoma, Oregon, Tennessee, Texas, Virginia, Washington, Wisconsin, Wyoming
- Key people: Marc Torres (CEO); Jimmy Wedding (CFO)
- Products: Cannabis-themed "Toasted" subs, salads and munchies
- Services: Dine-In; Delivery; Pickup; Catering
- Revenue: US$72 million (2021)
- Number of employees: 1250
- Website: chebahut.com

Cheba Hut Toasted Subs (Stylized as "CHēBA HUT") is a cannabis-themed restaurant franchise-chain in the United States.

It was founded by Scott Jennings, established in 1998 in Tempe, Arizona. The first store opened near the campus of Arizona State University where Jennings attended college.

== See also ==
- List of restaurant chains in the United States
