= Coast banksia =

Coast banksia is a common name for several plants and may refer to:

- Banksia attenuata, commonly known as candlestick banksia, coast banksia or slender banksia;
- Banksia integrifolia, commonly known as coast banksia or white honeysuckle.
