= First Cannabis Church of Logic and Reason =

Cannabis-based religious movement

- Formation: June 2016
- Founder: Jeremy Hall
- Type: Cannabis-based religious movement
- Headquarters: Lansing, Michigan, U.S.
- Minister: Jeremy Hall

The First Cannabis Church of Logic and Reason is a cannabis-based religious movement based in Lansing, Michigan. It held its first non-denominational service in June 2016. The service was led by Jeremy Hall, an ordained minister and medical cannabis patient. Under Lansing city law, the church may not be penalized for allowing possession or consumption on its private property.

== See also ==
- Cannabis and religion
- Cannabis in Michigan
- First Church of Cannabis
