= Chronic Tacos =

American fast casual restaurant chain

- Company type: Private
- Industry: Fast casual Franchising
- Founded: 2002; 23 years ago in Newport Beach, California, US
- Founder: Daniel Biello and Randy Wyner
- Number of locations: 60+ (2020)
- Area served: United States; Canada; Japan
- Key people: Michael Mohammed (CEO); Randy Wyner (Director of Sales)
- Products: Tacos; Mission burritos; Tostada bowls; Salad bowls; Carne asada fries; Churros
- Website: chronictacos.com

Chronic Tacos is an American chain of fast casual restaurants specializing in tacos, Mission or California burritos, tostada bowls, carne asada fries and churros. The first Chronic Tacos restaurant was opened in 2002 in Newport Beach, California, by Daniel Biello and Randy Wyner. As of 2020, the company operates over 60 locations across the United States, Canada and Japan.

Since 2011, the company has partnered with Dexter Holland's Gringo Bandito hot sauce company to host the Gringo Bandito Chronic Tacos Challenge, a competitive eating contest in which Takeru Kobayashi set world records in 2015 and again in 2017 for taco eating.

== History ==
Daniel Biello and Randy Wyner opened the first Chronic Tacos in Newport Beach, California, in 2002. Their initial concept was one inspired by the local taquerias they had grown up eating at, but that allowed more customization. In 2005, they opened their second location in Huntington Beach, California. In 2006, Chronic Tacos started franchising with a third location in San Clemente, California. As the company grew, Biello and Wyner decided to give up their controlling interest citing burnout.

In 2010, Chronic Tacos opened its first location in Canada. In 2011, Wyner started talking with Michael Mohammed, a franchisee financier, about buying back Chronic Tacos. In 2012, Mohammed and Wyner acquired majority control of the company and stopped franchising until 2015. In 2018, Chronic Tacos opened its first location in Japan.

In 2016, Chronic Tacos began offering a vegetarian protein option consisting of common fajita vegetables and in 2019 the franchise partnered with Beyond Meat to launch and begin offering Beyond Beef Crumbles, a new vegan protein option.
