= First Church of Cannabis =

Cannabis-based church in Indiana

Coordinates: 39°43′5″N 86°6′54.5″W

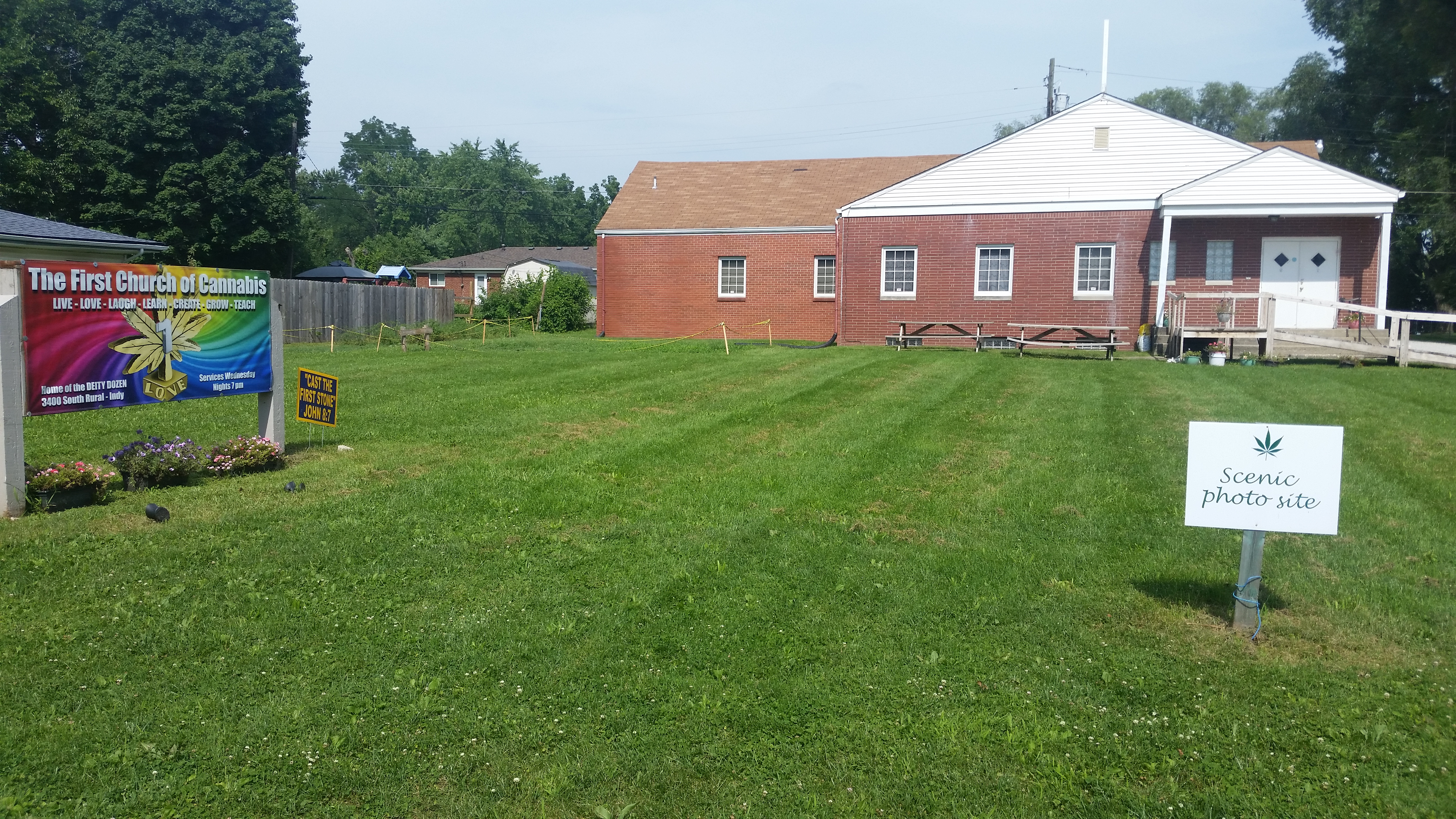
- First Church of Cannabis building
- Type: Cannabis-based new religious movement
- Scripture: Deity Dozen
- Grand Poobah: Bill Levin
- Region: United States
- Headquarters: Indianapolis
- Founder: Bill "Grand Poobah" Levin
- Origin: March 26, 2015; Indianapolis
- Congregations: 1 (3400 South Rural Street, Indianapolis)
- Tax status: 501(c)(3) tax-exempt

First Church of Cannabis is a cannabis-based church founded in 2015 and registered in the U.S. state of Indiana.

== History ==
The First Church of Cannabis was founded in March 2015 by Bill Levin, who attended Indianapolis Hebrew Congregation, a Reform Judaism synagogue, as a child. He said it was a direct response to the state's Religious Freedom Restoration Act (RFRA). Monthly dues are $4.20. Levin said that the church was granted IRS tax-exempt status less than 30 days after he applied.

Levin titles himself Grand Poobah, or highest holy official, of the church. He claimed that he had the idea to found the church while watching the popular television series The Flintstones. "Grand Poobah" is a term derived from the name of the haughty character Pooh-Bah in Gilbert and Sullivan's The Mikado (1885), and used recurringly in The Flintstones as the name of a high-ranking elected position in a secret society, the Loyal Order of Water Buffaloes.

The group planned to test RFRA on July 1, 2015, with a service in Indiana including the use of cannabis. However, legal threats from the city forced the first service to not use marijuana at all. The service went without any arrests, even with a heavy police presence, although there were protesters from a nearby Christian church. Parking was restricted, as the police argued that they were enforcing a city law on parking on a street less than 24 feet wide. Nearby residents also restricted parking on their property, although at least one person allowed parking for a small fee. The service featured a comedian, live music, and dancing. Food trucks were outside along with a merchandise table selling t-shirts and stickers.

A security camera was installed outside of the church on the first day of service. City officials argued that the camera was installed to ensure public safety. Levin retorted by saying "I find it flattering. If you think we are important enough to install a camera so you can have a guy watch us 24 hours a day, good! Good! You're spending our Hoosier tax money proper."

The church has a list of twelve commandments called the "Deity Dozen", which includes abstention from Internet trolling.

The group's meetinghouse is located at a former Christian church building on South Rural Street in Indianapolis. Services are held every Wednesday at 7.

== Legal status ==
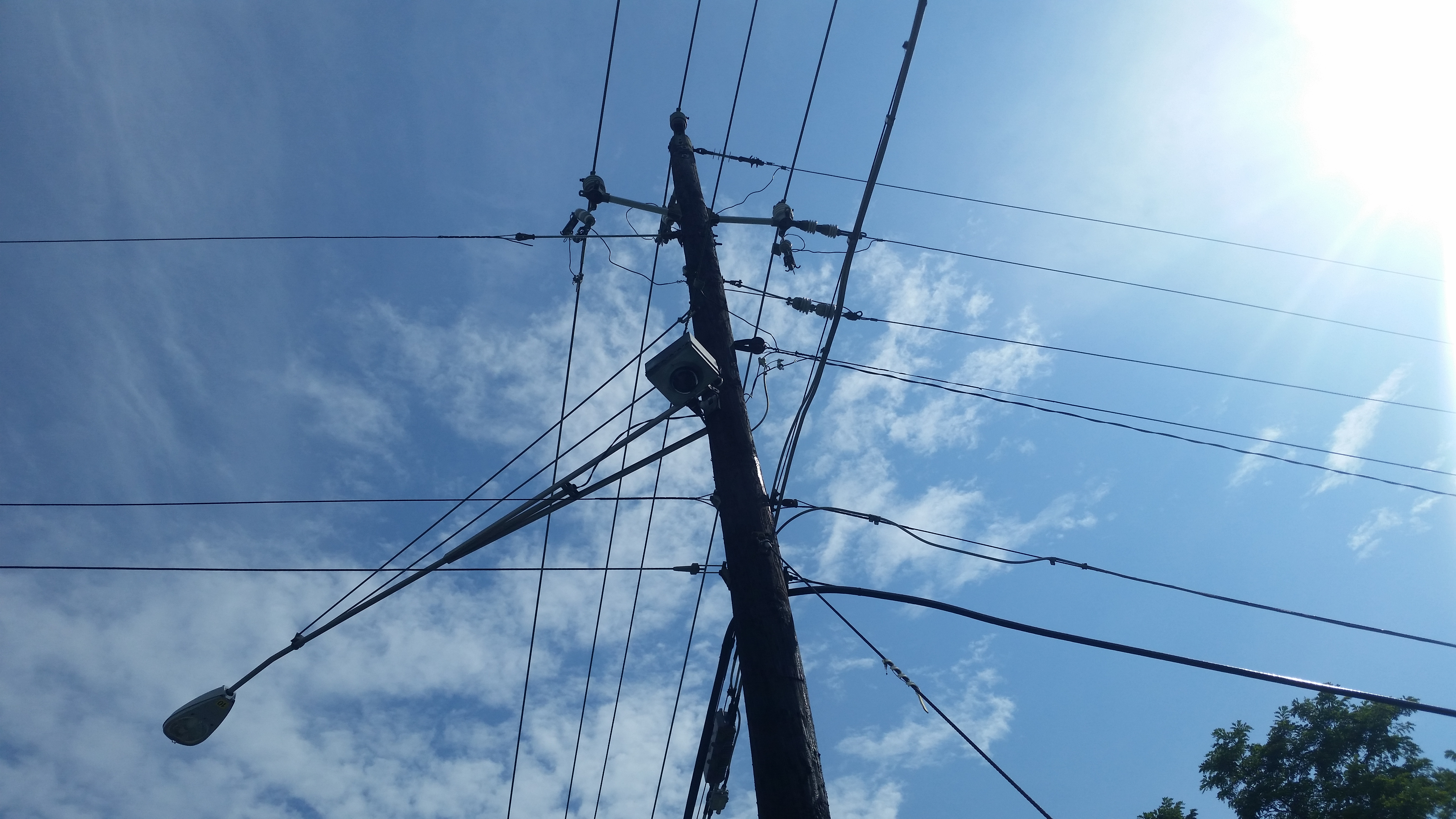
Security camera installed by the city of Indianapolis outside of the church, arguably for public safety

The legal status of the Church of Cannabis' use of marijuana in a jurisdiction where it is illegal, but the Religious Freedom Restoration Act holds, has been debated by legal experts. The Supreme Court case set forth certain criteria in U.S. v. Meyers that may or may not match fourteen criteria listed by the Internal Revenue Service in granting tax-exempt status. Several days after its first service, the Church sued both the state of Indiana and the city of Indianapolis, claiming that the present marijuana laws infringed on their religious beliefs. This case was dismissed on summary judgement and again on appeal.

== Deity Dozen ==
The Deity Dozen are a set of guidelines put forth by the Church.

1. Treat everyone with love as an equal.
2. The day starts with your smile every morning. When you get up, wear it first.
3. Help others when you can. Not for money, but because it's needed.
4. Treat your body as a temple. Do not poison it with poor quality foods and sodas.
5. Do not take advantage of people. Do not intentionally hurt anything.
6. Never start a fight... only finish them.
7. Grow food, raise animals, get nature into your daily routine.
8. Do not be a "troll" on the internet, respect others without name calling and being vulgarly aggressive.
9. Spend at least 10 mins a day just contemplating life in a quiet space.
10. Protect those who can not protect themselves.
11. Laugh often, share humor. Have fun in life, be positive.
12. Cannabis, "the Healing Plant" is our sacrament. It brings us closer to ourselves and others. It is our fountain of health, our love, curing us from illness and depression. We embrace it with our whole heart and spirit, individually and as a group.

== See also ==
- Cannabis culture
- Entheogen
- First Cannabis Church of Logic and Reason
- Native American Church
- Rastafari
- Spiritual use of cannabis
- Stoner Jesus Bible Study
- Ed Forchion
