= Cannabis in Pennsylvania =

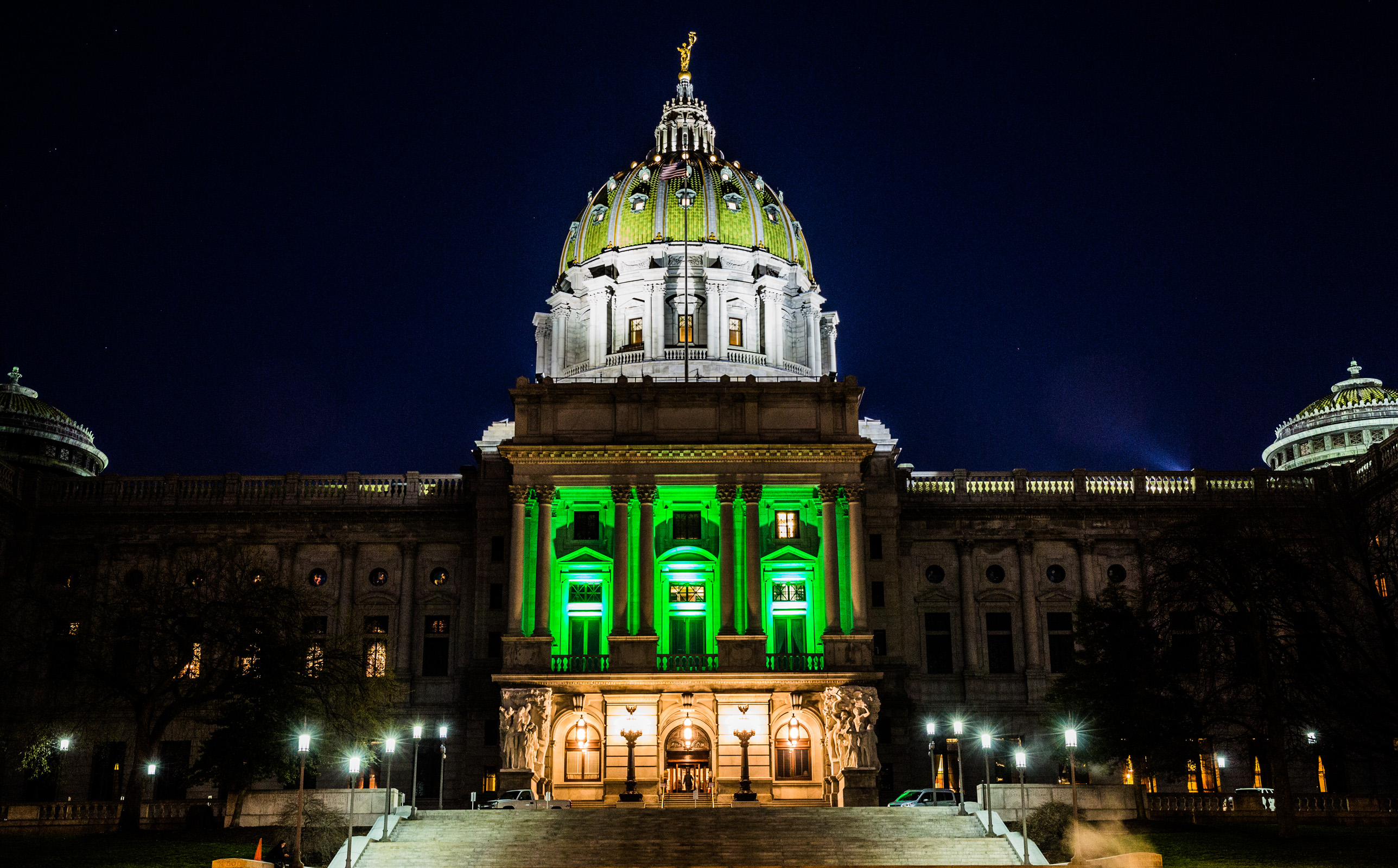
Pennsylvania State Capitol lit green to celebrate passage of medical cannabis legislation by the House of Representatives (March 16, 2016)

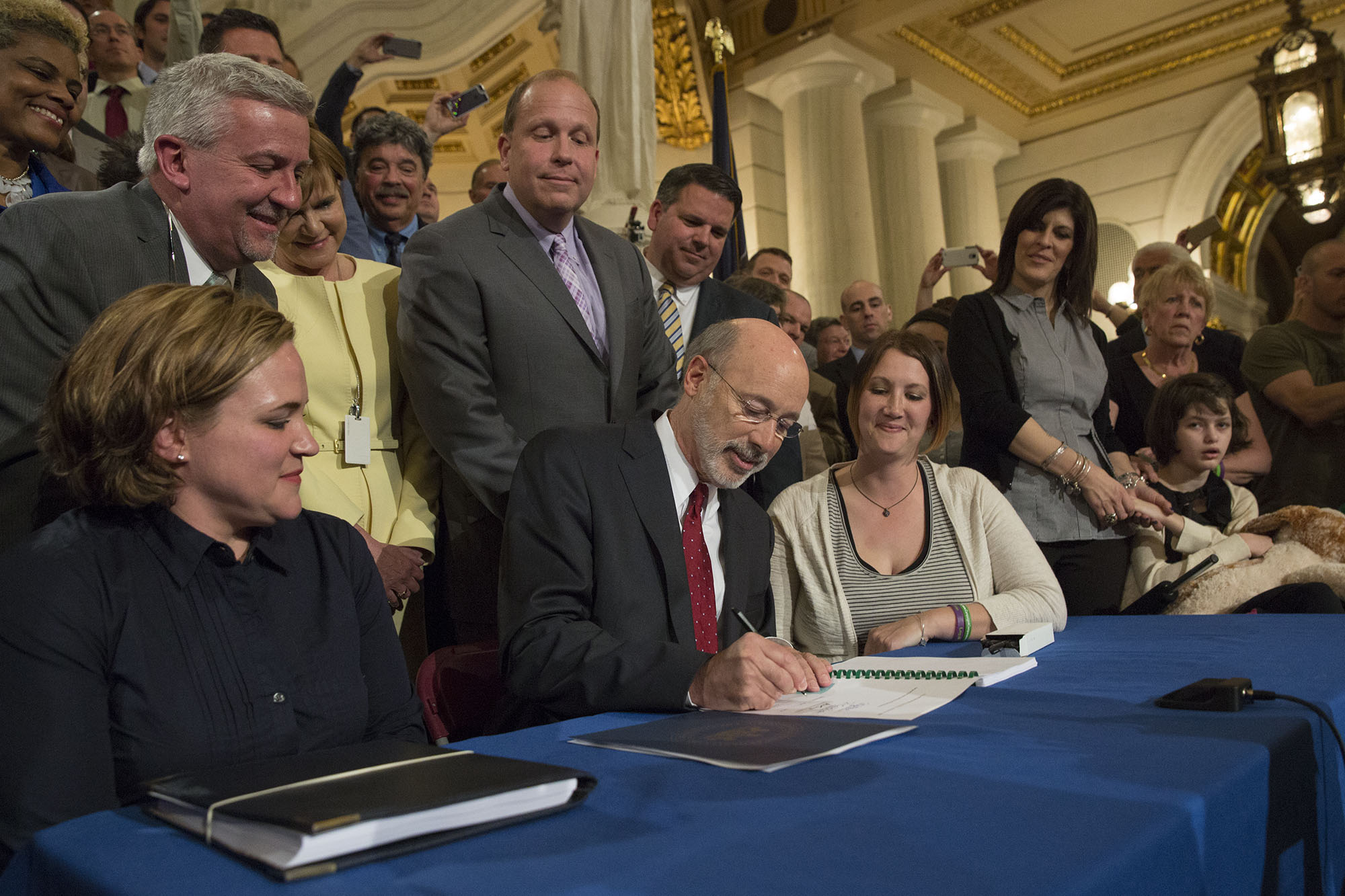
Governor Tom Wolf signs Senate Bill 3 to legalize medical cannabis in Pennsylvania (April 17, 2016)

Cannabis in Pennsylvania is illegal for recreational use, but possession of small amounts is decriminalized in several of the state's largest cities. Medical use was legalized in 2016 through a bill passed by the state legislature.

== Medical use legalized (2016) ==
On April 17, 2016, Governor Tom Wolf signed Senate Bill 3 to legalize the medical use of cannabis. The bill allowed the use of cannabis with a physician's approval for treatment of 17 qualifying conditions listed in the bill. It also set up a state-licensed system for the distribution of cannabis to patients, with the requirement (later eliminated in 2018) that only non-smokable forms be sold. A 5% tax rate was imposed on sales between growers, processors, and dispensaries. No allowance for home cultivation was made.

Senate Bill 3 passed the House by a 149-46 vote and the Senate 42–7. Upon its enactment, Pennsylvania became the 24th state to legalize cannabis for medical use. The first licensed sales occurred on February 15, 2018.

== Pennsylvania Democratic Party resolution (2017) ==
In September 2017, the Pennsylvania Democratic State Committee approved a platform position stating that "cannabis is safe enough, and ubiquitous enough in society, that it does not need to be restricted or prohibited by the Controlled Substances Act". The resolution urged the state Democratic Party to "support Democratic candidates and policies which promote the full repeal of cannabis prohibition by its removal from the Controlled Substances Act, and to support the creation of new laws which regulate it in a manner similar to other culturally accepted commodities". The resolution specified a number of reasons for supporting legalization, including the racist and unscientific reasons for its original prohibition, the lack of fitting the criteria to be placed in Schedule I of the Controlled Substance Act, and Auditor General Eugene DePasquale's support for legalization to save criminal justice costs and earn revenue via taxed sales.

== "Smoke a joint, lose your license" repealed (2018) ==
House Bill 163 was signed into law by Governor Wolf on October 24, 2018. It repealed a policy known as "Smoke a joint, lose your license" under which possession of cannabis or any other illegal drug was punished with a mandatory six month driver's license suspension. Under the policy, approximately 149,000 licenses were suspended for non-driving drug offenses from 2011 to 2016, according to Equal Justice Under Law, a nonprofit civil rights organization. House Bill 163 was sponsored by State Representative Rick Saccone, passing with only one opposing vote in the House and unanimously in the Senate.

== Statewide listening tour (2019) ==
In December 2018, during a Q&A session with constituents on Twitter, Governor Wolf tweeted: "I think it is time for Pennsylvania to take a serious and honest look at legalizing recreational marijuana." One month later, Wolf announced a statewide tour by Lieutenant Governor John Fetterman to gather public input on the idea. He stated: "We could choose to ignore what's going on in the world and just pretend that nothing has happened, nothing has changed, or we can actually open our eyes and ears and say, 'let's go out and ask—let's find out.'" The 70-stop tour, spanning all 67 counties in the state, kicked off February 11 in Harrisburg and ended May 19 in Philadelphia.

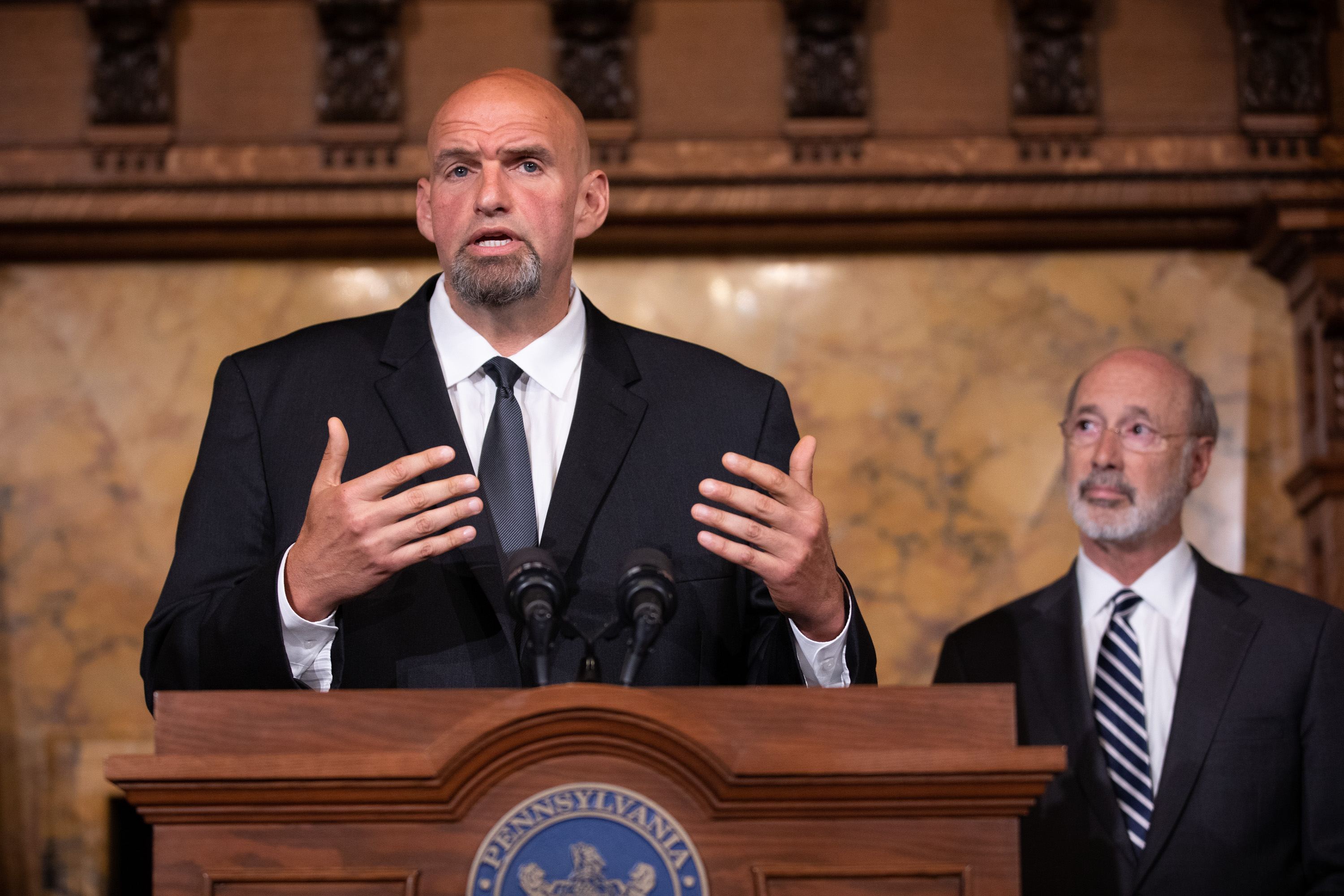
Wolf and Fetterman discuss the results of the statewide listening tour which gathered input on cannabis legalization (September 25, 2019)

At a press conference on September 25, 2019, Wolf and Fetterman announced that of the more than 10,000 people that attended the listening tour, 68% were in favor of recreational legalization and there was near unanimous support for decriminalization. Also, the governor announced his support for legalizing recreational use for the first time. With the release of the listening tour report, the governor and lieutenant governor called for three actions to be taken by the state legislature:

1. Passage of legislation to decriminalize possession of small amounts of cannabis.
2. Passage of legislation to expunge prior cannabis convictions.
3. Debate and consideration of legislation to legalize cannabis for recreational use.

== Governor's push for legalization (2020) ==
On September 3, 2020, Wolf and Fetterman held a press conference to reiterate their call for the legislature to take up a cannabis legalization bill. Wolf stated: "Now more than ever, especially right in the middle of a pandemic, we have a desperate need for the economic boost that the legalization of cannabis could provide." Fetterman added: "I would pitch this as a jobs bill as much as anything. Legalizing marijuana would create tens of thousands of jobs that require no subsidy, no kind of guidance other than to rewrite the law and allow this business to flourish in Pennsylvania." Also speaking at the press conference in support of legalization was State Senator Sharif Street.

On September 16, 2020, Wolf, Fetterman, and a representative from NORML held a press conference to further call for the legislature to act. Wolf stated: "New Jersey citizens are going to vote [on a cannabis legalization referendum], and if they vote to legalize it, we will have given up the opportunity to gain the revenue that will definitely go across the border to New Jersey." Fetterman added that "40 percent of our population will live within a 30-minute drive or less of legal marijuana", and that Pennsylvania should reap the economic benefits of these consumers, "not New Jersey".

On October 13, 2020, Wolf held a press conference in Monroe County to make a third call for legalization in the state. He was joined at the press conference by a local hemp farmer and State Representative Maureen Madden.

== Municipal reforms ==
Jurisdictions in the below table have revised their municipal ordinances to lessen penalties for cannabis offenses. Police still retain the ability to charge individuals under state law, however. In Allentown and part of Bethlehem, police officials have said they will enforce state law only per the directive of Lehigh County District Attorney Jim Martin.

Municipality	Date	Policy reform
Philadelphia	September 2014	City council voted 13–3 to decriminalize up to 30 grams, punishable by a $25 fine.
Pittsburgh	December 2015	City council voted 7–2 to decriminalize up to 30 grams, punishable by a $25 fine.
Harrisburg	July 2016	City council voted unanimously to decriminalize small amounts, punishable by a $75 fine.
State College	August 2016	City council voted 5–2 to decriminalize up to 30 grams, punishable by a $250 fine.
York	July 2017	City council voted 4–1 to decriminalize up to 30 grams, punishable by a $100 fine.
Erie	January 2018	City council voted unanimously to decriminalize up to 30 grams, punishable by a $25 fine.
Allentown	May 2018	City council voted 4–3 to decriminalize up to 30 grams, punishable by a $25 fine for a first offense.
Bethlehem	June 2018	City council voted unanimously to decriminalize up to 30 grams, punishable by a $25 fine for a first offense.
Lancaster	September 2018	City council voted 6–1 to decriminalize small amounts, punishable by a $25 fine for a first offense.
Steelton	March 2019	Borough council voted unanimously to decriminalize up to 30 grams for a first offense, punishable by a $25–$100 fine.
Delaware County	November 2020	County council voted unanimously to decriminalize up to 30 grams, punishable by a $50 fine.
Carlisle	December 2020	Borough council voted to decriminalize up to 30 grams, punishable by a $25 fine.
Doylestown	April 2021	Borough council voted 8–1 to decriminalize up to 30 grams, punishable by a $25 fine.

On January 20, 2015, Constable Ed Quiggle, Jr. of Sunbury signed the Compassionate Medical Cannabis Reform Resolution, making it official policy for the Office of Constable for the 9th Ward of the City to not enforce or cooperate in the enforcement of any acts which prohibit, penalize, or criminalize the possession, cultivation, or use of medical cannabis, hemp, cannabinoids, and other illegal or experimental drugs, becoming the first law enforcement agency in Pennsylvania, and perhaps the first in the United States, to enact such a policy.

== Public opinion ==
A poll by CBS News in 2022 indicated that 66% of registered voters in Pennsylvania support legalizing recreational cannabis.

A January 2025 poll by Change Research, which was commissioned by the advocacy group ResponsiblePA, found that 68% of the state's registered voters supported legalizing the sale of adult-use cannabis.
