= Hans Arne Jensen =

Danish botanist, agronomist, and writer

Hans Arne Jensen is a Danish botanist, agronomist, and writer.

== Biography ==
Jensen earned a PhD at Agricultural University in Copenhagen, and then worked for 40 years for the Ministry of Agriculture, Plant Directorate, at the Danish state seed testing station. His researches in paleobotany include publications on organic macrofossils, on the germination of ancient seeds, and archaeological investigations into seeds and crops in Viking-era Danish towns.

== Publications ==
- Macrofossils and their Contribution to the History of the Spermatophyte Flora in Southern Scandinavia from 13000 BC to 1536 AD
- Bibliography on Seed Morphology 1998
- Bibelens Planteverden (2004), English translation Plant World of the Bible (2012)
