= Efraim Zalmanovich =

Efraim Zalmonovich (Hebrew: 'אפרים זלמנוביץ) is an Orthodox Jewish rabbi known for declaring medical cannabis to be kosher in 2013. Zalmanovich is rabbi of Mazkeret Batia, Israel.

== Cannabis ruling ==
In 2013, Zalmonovich issued a halahkic ruling that consuming recreational cannabis is forbidden, but consuming medical cannabis is a mitzvah. This ruling was at odds with an earlier ruling by Rabbi Hagai Bar Giora who earlier in 2013 opined that there is no issue with smoking cannabis. Zalmonovich's views were informed by personal experience: “My mother and sister were diagnosed with cancer and suffered from terrible pain. So I asked the doctors for as much marijuana for them as possible.”

He further noted that cannabis is however not chametz, and that on Jewish holidays where starting a fire is forbidden, one may not strike a flame to ignite cannabis, but it is allowed to light it from a candle already burning, or consume a cannabis edible.

== See also ==
- Smoking in Jewish law
