= 420 (cannabis culture) =

Number referring to cannabis

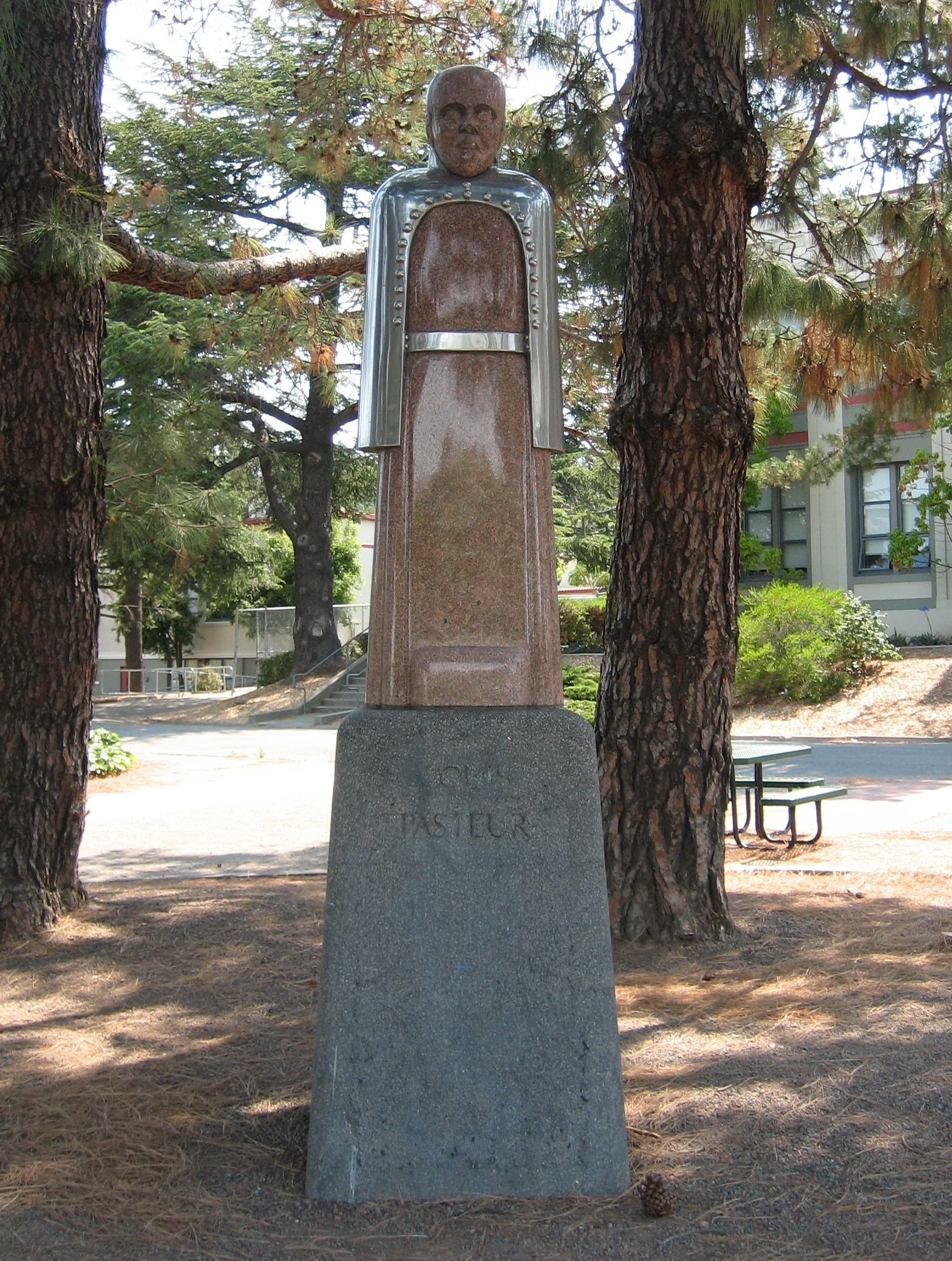
- Statue of Louis Pasteur at San Rafael High School, by Benny Bufano (1940), site of the earliest 4:20 gatherings in 1971
- Observed by: Cannabis counterculture, legal reformers, entheogenic spiritualists, and general users of cannabis
- Type: Secular
- Significance: Time/date to celebrate cannabis
- Observances: Cannabis consumption, traditionally cannabis smoking, dispensary discounts
- Date: 4:20 p.m./April 20
- Frequency: Daily (4:20 p.m.), annually (April 20)

420 (pronounced four-twenty) is cannabis culture slang for cannabis consumption, especially smoking around the time 4:20 p.m., and annual cannabis-oriented celebrations, protests, and advocacy held on 4/20, the U.S. notation for April 20.

== Origins ==
Five high school students in San Rafael, California, coined the term as part of their 1971 search for an abandoned cannabis crop, based on a treasure map made by the grower. Calling themselves the Waldos, because their typical hang-out spot "was a wall outside the school", the five students—Steve Capper, Dave Reddix, Jeffrey Noel, Larry Schwartz, and Mark Gravich—designated the Louis Pasteur statue on the grounds of San Rafael High School as their meeting place, and 4:20 p.m. as their meeting time. The Waldos referred to this plan with the phrase "4:20 Louis". After several failed attempts to find the crop, the group eventually shortened their phrase to "4:20", which ultimately evolved into a code-word the teens used to refer to consuming cannabis.

Steven Hager of High Times popularized the story of the Waldos. The first High Times mention of 4:20 smoking and a 4/20 holiday appeared in May 1991 and erroneously attributed the origin of the term to a police code; this and other spurious origin stories became common. The connection to the Waldos appeared in December 1998. Hager attributed the early spread of the phrase to Grateful Dead followers—after "Waldo" Reddix became a roadie for the Grateful Dead bassist, Phil Lesh—and called for 4:20 p.m. to be the socially accepted time of the day to consume cannabis.

Another San Rafael group led by Brad "The Bebe" Bann claims to have originated the term before the Waldos.

== International observance of April 20 ==
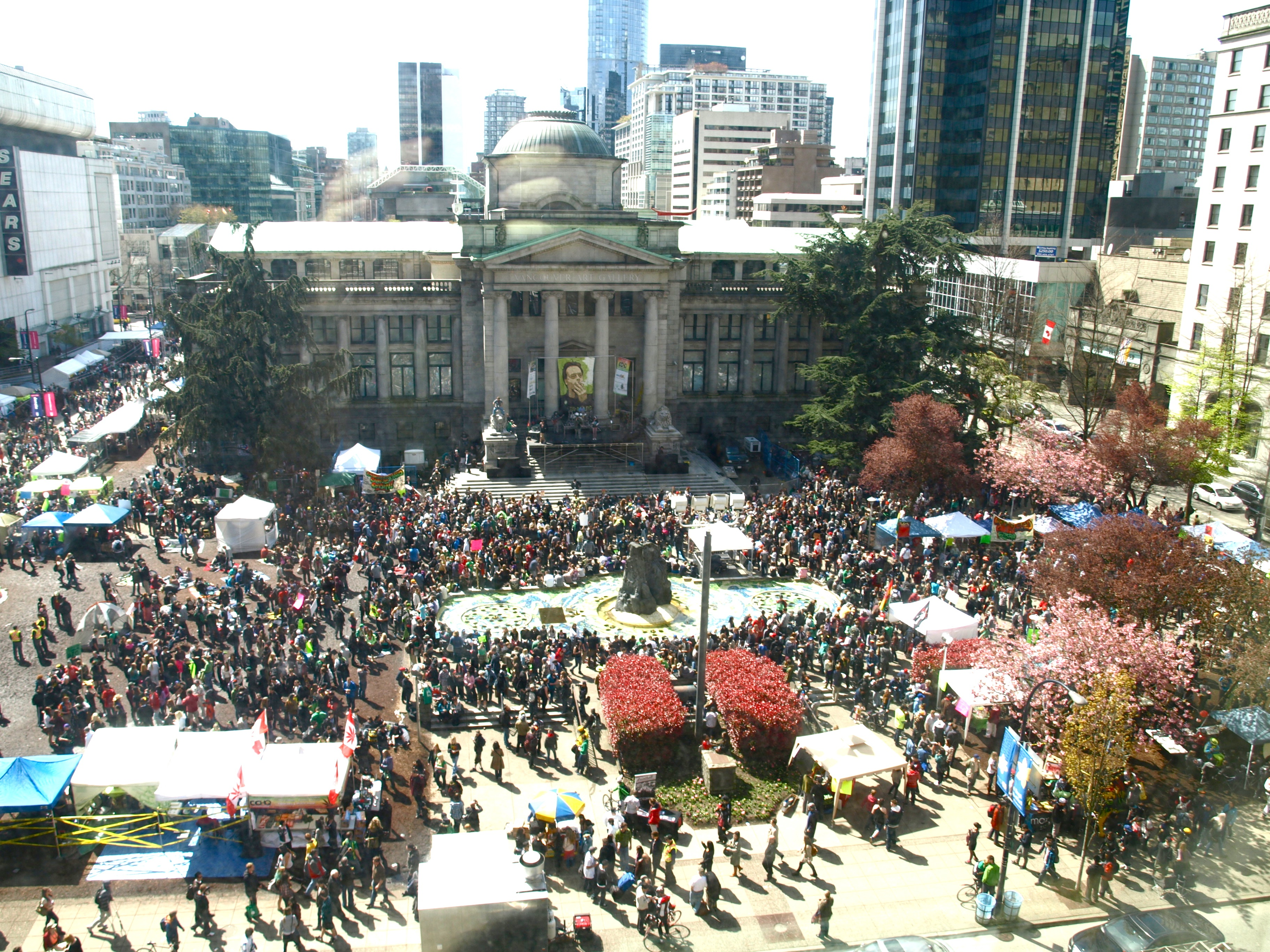
Vancouver, April 20, 2012

April 20 has become an international counterculture holiday based on the celebration and consumption of cannabis, as well as "cannabis culture, protest and advocacy". Events typically advocate for cannabis liberalization and legalization. Vivian McPeak, a founder of Seattle's Hempfest, states that 4/20 is "half celebration and half call to action". Paul Birch calls it a global movement and suggests that one cannot stop events like these.

Many marijuana users protest in civil disobedience by gathering in public to smoke at 4:20 p.m.

In 2017, while marijuana legalization was expanding rapidly in the US, cannabis activist Steve DeAngelo notes that "even if our activist work were complete, 420 morphs from a statement of conscience to a celebration of acceptance, a celebration of victory, a celebration of our amazing connection with this plant" which "will always be worthy of celebration".

=== Americas ===
North American observances have been held at many locations, including:

- Ann Arbor: Hash Bash
- Berkeley: campus of the University of California, Berkeley on the Memorial Glade north of the Doe Memorial Library
- Boston: Boston Common
- Boulder: campus of the University of Colorado Boulder
- Denver: Civic Center Park
- Edmonton: The Alberta Legislature Building
- Mexico City: Mexican Senate under the slogan Planton 420.
- Montréal: Le Mont Royal George-Étienne Cartier Monument
- New York City: Washington Square Park in Manhattan
- Ottawa: Parliament Hill and Major's Hill Park
- Portland, Oregon
- San Francisco: "Hippie Hill" in Golden Gate Park near the Haight-Ashbury
- Santa Cruz: Porter College meadows at the University of California, Santa Cruz
- St. Louis, Missouri: Loop 420 Fest at Delmar Loop (University City)
- Toronto: Nathan Phillips Square and Sankofa Square
- Vancouver: The Vancouver Art Gallery and Sunset Beach between 2016 and 2026.
- Washington, D.C.: National Mall, United States Capitol

=== Europe ===
In the United Kingdom, events have been held in Hyde Park in London. Events have also been held in Brighton, Bristol, Durham, Glasgow, Leeds, and Plymouth. The Teesside Cannabis Club also holds an annual event.

In Ljubljana, Slovenia, the University of Ljubljana's student organization has carried out several annual cannabis-themed protests that have contributed to the debate on cannabis status in Slovenia and the subsequent legislation proposals in 2018 by gathering responses from various political parties in Slovenia and ranking them accordingly.

In Northern Cyprus, known for strict drug laws and intolerance to cannabis consumption, the first 420 event was held in the capital city Lefkoşa in 2015. On April 20, 2017, a small group of protesters carried out an event near the parliament building and made a public statement, demanding the legalization of cannabis sale, consumption, and production with state regulations.

=== Oceania ===
Australian observances have been held at many locations, over many years, including:

- "Who Are We Hurting?" – Sydney City: Martin Place, NSW (2019)
- 420 Picnic – Melbourne, VIC (2019)
- "Who Are We Hurting?" – Sydney, NSW (2018)
- "Who Are We Hurting?" – Sydney City: Kings Cross, NSW (2017)
- Happy Birthday Weed Craze Collective – Sydney, NSW (2016)
- 420 Protest at Sydney Town Hall by Jesse Willesee – 2015

Events have been held in Dunedin, New Zealand, at the University of Otago.

== Other effects ==
=== Traffic safety ===
Despite two studies reporting a supposed increase in the risk of fatal motor vehicle crashes on April 20, further investigation and analysis found the evidence did not support such claims.

=== Stolen signs ===
In the US, signs bearing the number 420 have been frequently stolen. In Colorado, the Colorado Department of Transportation replaced the Mile Marker 420 sign on I-70 east of Denver with one reading 419.99 in an attempt to stop the thievery. The Idaho Department of Transportation (ITD) replaced the mile marker 420 sign on U.S. Highway 95, just south of Coeur d'Alene, with mile marker 419.9. The Washington State Department of Transportation implemented similar measures, but only replaced one of the two 420 signs in the state, with the remaining one being subsequently stolen. According to The Washington Post, there are eleven 420 mile markers in the US, after three replacements and one stolen and not replaced. In Goodhue County, Minnesota, officials have changed "420 St" street signs to "42x St". The mile marker 420 sign on U.S. Route 89, the only 420 marker in the state of Utah, is frequently stolen.

=== Legislation and other government recognition ===
In 2003, California Senate Bill 420 was introduced to regulate medical marijuana use. An unsuccessful 2010 bill to legalize cannabis in Guam was called Bill 420. A North Dakota bill to legalize cannabis was HB 1420, introduced in January 2021.

The Marijuana Freedom and Opportunity Act (which if enacted would decriminalize and deschedule cannabis in the United States) was announced by Senator and Senate Minority Leader Chuck Schumer (D-New York) on April 20, 2018. On January 9, 2019, H.R. 420 was introduced into the 116th Congress by Representative Earl Blumenauer (D-Oregon), named the Regulate Marijuana Like Alcohol Act, which is designed to remove cannabis from the Controlled Substances Act and return regulation to the states.

The State of Colorado auctioned off several cannabis-themed personalized license plates in 2021, with the bidding to be closed on April 20 (4/20). The highest bid shortly before the auction closed was over $6,500 for "ISIT420".

Following the success of Washington, D.C.'s Initiative 71 to legalize cannabis in 2014, Mayor Muriel Bowser granted license plate number 420 to the campaign's leader, Adam Eidinger.

The U.S. federal government and some localities conduct Anti-420 public service announcement campaigns.

=== Literature ===
Several books about cannabis have "420" in the title; examples include the cannabis cookbooks The 420 Cannabis Cookbook, published by Simon & Schuster, and The 420 Gourmet published in 2016 by HarperCollins.

=== Commerce ===
Several American restaurant chains have offered "420" themed promotions to coincide with April 20. They included well known national chains Wingstop, KFC, and Taco Bell, as well as smaller entities like Voodoo Donut.

Tesla CEO Elon Musk tweeted in 2018 about taking his company private at $420 a share. Musk testified during a trial that any associations with cannabis were coincidental; however, in the SEC filing, he admitted that he had recently discovered the number's importance within the cannabis culture and thought his girlfriend would find it funny. Musk purchased Twitter in 2022 at $54.20 per share and the financing documents were signed on April 20, acknowledging the reference to marijuana culture both in the last three digits of the price and in the date. Musk continued making 420 references in June 2025 when Tesla Robotaxi service was launched in Austin, Texas where a flat fee of $4.20 was introduced, regardless of the distance travelled.

== See also ==
- "420" (Family Guy), 2009 television episode
- Drug subculture
- Legality of cannabis by country
- List of multinational festivals and holidays
- Bicycle Day (psychedelic holiday)
