= Church of Ambrosia =

Religious organization in California

- The organization's logo.
- Zide Door Church of Entheogenic Plants
- Formation: 2019
- Founder: Dave Hodges
- Type: Religious organization
- Headquarters: Oakland, California, United States
- Coordinates: 37°47′29″N 122°15′01″W
- Region served: San Francisco Bay Area
- Members: 137,000 (claimed) (2026)
- Head Pastor: Dave Hodges
- Subsidiaries: Zide Door Church of Entheogenic Plants
- Website: https://ambrosia.church/

Church of Ambrosia, also known as Zide Door, is a nondenominational religious organisation and psychedelic church founded in 2019 in Oakland, California. It is led by Dave Hodges and operates primarily in the San Francisco Bay Area.

The church is known for sacramental use of psychedelic drugs, particularly cannabis and psilocybin mushrooms, which it distributes at religious services and public events. It has been described as part of a movement of contemporary psychedelic and entheogen-based religious organisations in the United States.

The church opened a second location in San Francisco in 2023, which later closed in 2024 amid regulatory and zoning disputes. The organisation has also engaged in public advocacy related to drug policy and psychedelic legislation in California.

In 2020, its Oakland premises were raided by Oakland Police Department following allegations of unlicensed cannabis sales, leading to subsequent legal action against the City of Oakland. The organisation has also faced ongoing disputes with local authorities regarding permitting, zoning compliance, and enforcement actions related to its operations.

== History ==
Dave Hodges, who had a background in cannabis activism and lobbying for legalization, founded Church of Ambrosia in January 2019 in Oakland, California.

In April 2023, the church opened a second location in the South of Market neighbourhood of San Francisco.

== Operations ==
The church conducts public events around the use of entheogenic substances, including psilocybin mushrooms and cannabis. It has been described in media coverage as organising gatherings linked to cannabis culture and psychedelic advocacy, including events coinciding with the annual 4/20 observances in the San Francisco Bay Area.

In 2024, the organisation announced plans to provide harm-reduction and support services during an unsanctioned 4/20 gathering at Hippie Hill in San Francisco, alongside other groups and volunteers participating in the event.

The organisation has publicly commented on legislation affecting psychedelic substances in California, including the veto of Senate Bill 58 by Governor Gavin Newsom in 2023.

== Controversies ==
=== 2020 police raid ===
In May 2019, following a complaint that the church was operating as a cannabis dispensary without a permit, an undercover police officer visited the church, became a member, and purchased cannabis. On August 13, 2020, the Zide Door building was raided by Oakland Police Department.

In August 2022, Hodges filed a lawsuit against the City of Oakland and the Oakland Police Department alleging civil rights and religious freedom violations. The lawsuit was later voluntarily dismissed, and the church applied for a conditional use permit.

=== San Francisco location ===
In August 2024, former employees reported becoming "disillusioned" with the church and Hodges.

In December 2024, the church closed the San Francisco location, citing targeted harassment by the San Francisco Planning Department. This followed sustained legal and regulatory pressure regarding distribution and use of controlled substances, as well as ongoing disputes regarding zoning and compliance regulations for the operation of physical premises.

== See also ==
- Psychedelic church
- Entheogenic use of cannabis
- Psychedelic therapy
- Religion and drugs
- Cannabis in the United States
- Federal drug policy of the United States
