= Religion and alcohol =

Role of alcohol in several religions

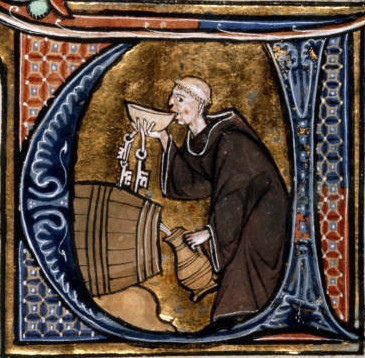
A monk samples wine

Religion and alcohol have a complex history. The world's religions have had different relationships with alcohol, reflecting diverse cultural, social, and religious practices across different traditions. While some religions strictly prohibit alcohol consumption, viewing it as sinful or harmful to spiritual and physical well-being, others incorporate it into their rituals and ceremonies. Throughout history, alcohol has held significant roles in religious observances, from the use of sacramental wine in Christian sacraments to the offering and moderate drinking of omiki (sacramental sake) in Shinto purification rituals.

In Christianity, attitudes towards alcohol have shifted over time, with some denominations advocating for moderation while others promote abstinence. The use of sacramental wine in religious rites, such as the Eucharist, underscores its symbolic significance within Christian theology. Similarly, Hinduism in Śruti texts such as Vedas and Upanishads, consumption of alcohol or intoxication is considered as a recipe of weakness, while in Smriti texts, the verses contradict each other and allow the use of alcohol for some castes, but remind of abstention being better. In Islam, the consumption of alcohol is strictly prohibited according to Islamic teachings, reflecting its foundational role in shaping Muslim identity.

Across various religious traditions, attitudes toward alcohol mirror broader societal norms and values, influencing individual behaviors and attitudes. Research on the correlation between religiosity and alcohol consumption reveals the complex interplay between religious affiliation, cultural context, and drinking patterns. Understanding these dynamics is crucial for informing public health initiatives and interventions aimed at addressing alcohol-related issues within specific religious communities.

As societies grapple with the complexities of alcohol consumption, further exploration of the intersection between religion, culture, and health behaviors provides valuable insights into how individuals navigate their religious and social identities concerning alcohol.

== Baháʼí Faith ==
The teachings of the Baháʼí Faith forbids the consumption of alcohol and other drugs unless prescribed by a physician. Intoxicants take away reason, interfere with making moral decisions, and harm the mind and body. Baháʼís are also encouraged to avoid jobs related to the production or sale of alcohol and are forbidden from involvement in the drug trade. Those addicted to alcohol or other drugs should seek medical assistance from doctors and/or support from organizations dedicated to curing addiction.

== Buddhism ==
Observant Buddhists typically avoid consuming alcohol (surāmerayamajja, referring to types of intoxicating fermented beverages), as it violates the 5th of the Five Precepts, the basic Buddhist code of ethics and can disrupt mindfulness and impede one's progress in the Noble Eightfold Path.

=== Permitted alcohol use in Vajrayana Buddhism ===
There are various Buddhist tantric traditions with the goal of attaining Enlightenment which are called by different names (Note: Lewis & deAngelis (2016), pp. 73–77: "The Tantric Buddhist traditions have been given several labels, but there is no single label that is accepted by all of these traditions. [...] It is important to note the use of this term in a plural form. Tantric or esoteric Buddhist traditions are multiple and also originated as multiple, distinct traditions of both text and practice.") such as Vajrayana, Secret Mantra, and Mantrayana. The Indo-Tibetan Buddhist tradition has been dominant in Tibet and the Himalayan regions. It first spread to Tibet in the 8th century and quickly rose to prominence. The Tibetan Buddhist tantric teachings have recently been spread to the Western world by the Tibetan diaspora. Nepalese Newar Buddhism meanwhile is still practiced in the Kathmandu Valley by the Newar people. The tradition maintains a canon of Sanskrit texts, the only Buddhist tantric tradition to still do so.

In Tibetan Buddhism, it is traditional to offer a tsok (Tib. for ganachakra) to Padmasambhava or other deities, usually gurus, on the tenth lunar day, and to a form of dakini such as Yeshe Tsogyal, Mandarava or Vajrayogini on the twenty-fifth lunar day. Generally, participants are required by their samaya (bond or vow) to partake of meat and alcohol, and the rite tends to have elements symbolic of coitus. Traditions of the Ganachakra liturgy and rite extends remains of food and other compassionate offerings to alleviate the insatiable hunger of the hungry ghosts, genius loci and other entities.

The use of these substances is related to the non-dual (advaya) nature of a Buddha's wisdom (buddhajñana). Since the ultimate state is in some sense non-dual, a practitioner can approach that state by "transcending attachment to dual categories such as pure and impure, permitted and forbidden". As the Guhyasamaja Tantra states "the wise man who does not discriminate achieves Buddhahood".

== Christianity ==
Christian views on alcohol are varied.

=== Sacramental wine ===
In some Christian denominations, the practitioners take a sip of wine, but non-alcoholic red wine is sometimes used.

Throughout the first 1,800 years of Church history, Christians generally consumed alcoholic beverages as a common part of everyday life and used "the fruit of the vine" in their central rite—the Eucharist or Lord's Supper. They held that both the Bible and Christian tradition taught that alcohol is a gift from God that makes life more joyous, but that over-indulgence leading to drunkenness is sinful or at least a vice.

However, the attempt has often been made to prove that the wine referred to in the Bible was non-alcoholic. As the Bible had written in Genesis 9:21, the story of Noah's first experience with the wine he had made shows that it was intoxicating.

Genesis 9: 21. "And he drank of the wine, and was drunken; and he was uncovered within his tent."

In this chapter, it is apparent that the wine Noah drank had an intoxicating effect on him since he became drunk. Scholars and theologians have used this incident to argue that alcoholic wine existed in biblical times. The allusion to Noah's intoxication emphasizes the presence of fermented and alcoholic drinks, opposing theories that biblical wine could have been substituted with non-alcoholic beverages. The interaction of these stories in the Bible continues to be a source of controversy and discussion over the nature and significance of alcoholic beverages in biblical theology and history.

The Catholic, Orthodox, Lutheran, and Assyrian traditions teach the real presence of Christ in the Eucharist. In Lutheran theology, the blood of Christ is in, with and under the sacramental wine (cf. sacramental union).

The Plymouth Brethren teach that the wine is a symbol of the blood of Christ.

==== Catholic Church ====
According to the Catholic Church, the sacramental wine used in the Eucharist must contain alcohol. Canon 924 of the present Code of Canon Law (1983) states:

§3 The wine must be natural, made from grapes of the vine, and not corrupt.

In the Catholic Church, the Eucharistic wine becomes the blood of Jesus Christ through transubstantiation.

==== Lutheran Churches ====
In Lutheranism, the Catechism teaches:

289. What are the visible elements in the Sacrament?

The visible elements are bread and wine.

935. Matt. 26:26-27 Jesus took bread … Then He took the cup.

Note: “The fruit of the vine” (Luke 22:18) in the Bible means wine, not grape juice. See also 1 Cor. 11:21

Some Evangelical Lutheran Church in America (ELCA) congregations make grape juice available for children and those who are abstaining from alcohol and some will accommodate those with an allergy to wheat, gluten, or grapes.

==== Methodist Churches ====
Churches in the Methodist tradition (inclusive of those aligned with the holiness movement) require that "pure, unfermented juice of the grape" be used in the sacrament of Holy Communion.

=== Views on recreational alcohol use by Christians ===
In the mid-19th century, some Protestant Christians moved from a position of allowing moderate use of alcohol (sometimes called moderationism) to either deciding that not imbibing was wisest in the present circumstances (abstentionism) or prohibiting all ordinary consumption of alcohol because it was believed to be a sin (prohibitionism). Many Protestant churches, particularly Methodists and other Evangelical groups, advocate for abstentionism and prohibitionism, being early leaders in the temperance movement of the 19th and 20th centuries; the Book of Discipline of the Evangelical Methodist Church Conference, for example, teaches:

Intemperance is excess of any kind of action, or indulgence, or exertion of body or mind, or any indulgence of appetites or passions which are injurious to the person, or contrary to morality. The scriptures teach us to be temperate in all things (I Cor. 9:25), this includes total abstinence from all that has the appearance of evil. No member shall be permitted to use, manufacture or sell intoxicating liquors, tobacco, or recreational drugs. ... The use of intoxicating liquors as a beverage, or trafficking therein; giving influence to, or voting for, the licensing of places for the sale of the same; using tobacco in any of its forms, or trafficking therein, is forbidden.

Today, these positions exist in Christianity, but the position of moderationism remains the most common worldwide, due to the adherence by the largest bodies of Christians, namely Roman Catholicism, Eastern Orthodoxy, Lutheranism and Anglicanism. Within the Catholic Church, the Pioneer Total Abstinence Association is a teetotal temperance organization that requires of its members complete abstinence from alcoholic drink as an expression of devotion to the Sacred Heart of Jesus. On the other hand, certain monastic communities like Trappists have brewed beer and made wine. The Woman's Christian Temperance Union is an ecumenical Christian organization with members from various denominational backgrounds that work together to promote teetotalism.

Alcohol in the Bible explores the dual role of alcohol, highlighting its positive uses and warnings against excess. In biblical narratives, the fermentation of fruit into wine holds significance, with grapes and wine often linked to both celebration and cautionary tales of sin and temptation, reminiscent of the concept of the forbidden fruit.

The Seventh-day Adventist Church, The Church of Jesus Christ of Latter-day Saints, and The Church of the Nazarene are all Christian Churches that prohibit the consumption of alcohol.

== Hinduism ==
Hinduism does not have a central authority which is followed by all Hindus, though religious texts generally discourage the use or consumption of alcohol. Brahmins are also forbidden from drinking alcohol. However, some texts refer to alcohol with a more positive opinion.

In Śruti texts such as Vedas and Upanishads which are the most authoritative texts in Hinduism and considered apauruṣeya, which means "authorless", intoxication is considered as a recipe of sinfulness, weakness, failure and violent behaviour in several verses:

One becomes sinful if he or she crosses even one of the 7 restraints. Yaskacharya defines these 7 sins in his Nirukta as: Theft, Adultery, Murder of a noble person, Jealousy, Dishonesty, Repeating misdeeds and consumption of alcohol.

— Rigveda 10.5.6

Those who consume intoxicants lose their intellect, talk rubbish, get naked and fight with each other.

— Rigveda 8.2.12

An action performed as per the inner voice does not lead to sins. Dumb arrogance against inner voice, however, is source of frustration and miseries in same manner as intoxication and gambling destroy us. Ishwar inspires those with noble elevated thoughts towards progress and propels down those who decide to think lowly. Lowly acts performed even in dreams cause decline.

— Rigveda 7.86.6

Weak minds are attracted towards meat, alcohol, sensuality and womanizing. But O non-violent mind, you focus your mind towards the world in same manner as a mother cares for her child.

— Atharvaveda 6.70.1

A person who steals gold, or drinks liquor, or goes to bed with his teacher's wife, or kills a brāhmin—these four are lost. Also lost is the fifth—one who keeps company with such people.

— Chandogya Upanishad 5.10.9

The Paippalāda Samhitā of the Atharvaveda (5.10) contains what scholars identify as a rare, secular hymn dedicated to wine. The passage provides technical insights into ancient Indian brewing culture. It highlights its flavor profile, specifically referencing the use of malted or fermented rice (aṣpasrakvā). It describes the active fermentation with the words "agitating" (udardanī) and "shaking/churning" (pracyavanī), the amber color (pāṃsupiṅgā) of the grain-wine, and its use by mortals to gain physical strength. The drink is repeatedly called vighasvarī, meaning highly nutritious or life-sustaining, yet it carries a potent sting. Rather than casting a moral taboo, the text observes the physiological effects neutrally, explicitly describing the flushed appearance (rudhirā) of the consumers, whom it labels as "poison-drinkers" (viṣapāvano).

In Smriti texts which are considered less authoritative than Sruti, the verses contradict each other and allow the use of alcohol for some castes, but remind of abstention being better. In Hindu texts, particularly the Dharma Shastras, the consumption of alcohol is addressed with varying levels of restriction based on caste. The Manu Smriti, a key text outlining the norms and codes of conduct for various social classes, prescribes different regulations for alcohol consumption among castes. While the Kshatriya caste, comprising warriors and rulers, is allowed to consume alcohol in moderation as part of their social and ceremonial functions, the Brahmin caste, consisting of priests, scholars, and teachers, is generally discouraged from consuming alcohol due to their spiritual and religious responsibilities. For the Vaishya caste, which includes merchants and traders, and the Shudra caste, comprising laborers and service providers, the Manu Smriti lays down specific rules and restrictions regarding alcohol consumption. The caste-based rules on alcohol consumption, like many other aspects of the caste system, have been subject to criticism and reinterpretation in modern times. Contemporary Hinduism has seen a shift towards a more egalitarian perspective, emphasizing individual choice and responsibility in matters such as alcohol consumption, rather than strict adherence to caste-based rules.

A twice-born person, having, through folly, drunk wine, shall drink wine red-hot; he becomes freed from his guilt, when his body has been completely burnt by it.

— Manusmriti 11.90, Gautama 23.1, Baudhāyana 2.1.18, Āpastamba 1.25.3, Vaśiṣtha 20.19, Yājñavalkya 3.253

There is no sin in the eating of meat, nor in wine, nor in sexual intercourse,
Such is the natural way of living beings; but abstention is conducive to great rewards.

— Manusmriti 5.56

The ten intoxicating drinks are unclean for a Brahmana; but a Kshatriya and a Vaishya commit no wrong in drinking them.

— Vishnu Smrti 22:84

Any brāhmaṇa or brāhmaṇa's wife who drinks liquor is taken by the agents of Yamarāja to the hell known as Ayaḥpāna. This hell also awaits any kṣatriya, vaiśya, or person under a vow who in illusion drinks soma-rasa. In Ayaḥpāna the agents of Yamarāja stand on their chests and pour hot melted iron into their mouths.

— Bhāgavata Purāṇa 5.26.29

The hell named Kaṣmala is full of phlegm and nasal mucus. The man who takes interest in wine and flesh is cast into that hell and kept there for the period of a Kalpa.

— Brahma Purana 106.127

The wretched Brahmana who from this day, unable to resist the temptation, will drink wine shall be regarded as having lost his virtue, shall be reckoned to have committed the sin of slaying a Brahmana, shall be hated both in this and the other worlds. I set this limit to the conduct and dignity of Brahmanas everywhere. Let the honest, let Brahmanas, let those with regard for their superiors, let the gods, let the three worlds, listen!.

— Mahabharata Adi Parva Sambhava Parva LXXVI

In Adi Shankara's Shankara Bhashya and Ramanuja's Sri Bhasya on Brahma Sutras, they quote Kathaka Samhita against drinking alcohol.

Sutra 3.4.31 "And hence the scriptural text prohibiting license. (For this reason also the scripture is against doing according to desire)"
There are scriptural passages prohibiting one from doing everything just as one pleases. License freedom from all discipline, cannot help us to attain Knowledge. "Therefore a Brahmana must not drink liquor" (Kathaka Sam.). Such Sruti texts are meant for this discipline.

=== Permitted alcohol use in Hindu sects ===
Tantra is an esoteric yogic tradition that developed on the Indian subcontinent from the middle of the 1st millennium CE onwards in both Hinduism and Buddhism. Early Tantric practices are sometimes attributed to Shaiva ascetics associated with Bhairava, the Kapalikas ("skull men", also called Somasiddhatins or Mahavartins). Besides the tradition of frequenting cremation grounds and carrying human skulls, little is known about them, and there is a paucity of primary sources on the Kapalikas. Samuel also states that the sources depict them as using alcohol and sex freely, that they were associated with terrifying female spirit-deities called dakinis, and that they were believed to possess magical powers, e.g. flight.

Flood states that the pioneers of Tantra were probably non-Brahmanical and possibly part of an ancient tradition. By the early medieval times, their practices may have included the imitation of deities such as Kali and Bhairava, with offerings of non-vegetarian food, alcohol and sexual substances. According to this theory, these practitioners would have invited their deities to enter them, then reverted the role in order to control that deity and gain its power. These ascetics would have been supported by low castes living at the cremation places.

In the non-dual and transgressive (or "left hand") traditions like the Kali cults and the Trika school, rituals and pujas can include certain left hand path elements that are not found in the more orthodox traditions. These transgressive elements include the use of skulls and other human bone implements (as part of the Kapalika vow), fierce deities like Bhairava, Kubjika and Kali which were used as part of meditative visualizations, ritual possession by the deities (avesa), sexual rites and offering the deity (as well as consuming) certain impure substances like meat, alcohol and sexual fluids. Padoux explains the transgressive practices as follows:

On the ritual and mental plane, transgression was an essential trait by which the nondualistic Tantric traditions set themselves apart from other traditions – so much so that they used the term "nondualistic practice" (advaitacara) to refer to the Kaula transgressive practices as a rejection of the duality (dvaita) of pure and impure in brahmanical society. Let us also note that for the nondualistic Saiva systems, the Yoginis were not active merely in the world of spirits; they were also powers present in humans – mistresses of their senses, governing their affects, which acquired an intensity and super-natural dimension through this divinization. This led adepts to an identification of their individual consciousness with the infinite divine Consciousness, thus also helping them transcend the sexual plane.

These practices are often seen as a way to expand one's consciousness through the use of bliss. Some ascetic sects, like the Aghori, also use alcohol as part of their rituals.

== Islam ==
In the context of Islam, the consumption of alcohol is prohibited in accordance with Islamic teachings, as it is seen as detrimental to both physical and spiritual well-being. This prohibition is often a foundational aspect of Muslim identity, reflecting a commitment to faith and adherence to religious principles. However, the relationship between Islam, and alcohol is multifaceted and influenced by factors such as cultural context, personal beliefs, and degrees of religiosity.

In the Quran, khamr, meaning "wine", is variably referenced as an incentive from Satan, as well as a cautionary note against its adverse effect on human attitude in several verses:

O you who have believed, indeed, intoxicants, gambling, [sacrificing on] stone altars [to other than Allah], and divining arrows are but defilement from the work of Satan, so avoid it that you may be successful.

— Surat 5:90

Satan only wants to cause between you animosity and hatred through intoxicants and gambling and to avert you from the remembrance of Allah and from prayer. So will you not desist?

— Surat 5:91

Another verse acknowledges the harms of wine and gambling:

They ask you about wine and gambling. Say, In them is great sin and benefit for people. But their sin is greater than their benefit." And they ask you what they should spend. Say, "The excess [beyond needs]. Thus Allah makes clear to you the verses [of revelation] that you might give thought.

— Surat 2:219

And from the fruits of the palm trees and grapevines you take intoxicant and good provision. Indeed in that is a sign for a people who reason.

— Surat 16:67

The Quran states that one of the delights of Paradise for the righteous is wine as a promise by God.

Is the description of Paradise, which the righteous are promised, wherein are rivers of water unaltered, rivers of milk the taste of which never changes, rivers of wine delicious to those who drink, and rivers of purified honey, in which they will have from all [kinds of] fruits and forgiveness from their Lord, like [that of] those who abide eternally in the Fire and are given to drink scalding water that will sever their intestines?

— Surat 47:15

In Sahih al-Bukhari, written around 2 centuries after the Quran, the prohibition is against alcoholic drinks in general. For example, Muhammad is presented as cautioning against drinking, warning of repenting in afterlife:

Whoever drinks alcoholic drinks in the world and does not repent (before dying), will be deprived of it in the Hereafter.

— Sahih al-Bukhari 5575

It is also narrated in a hadith: .

An adulterer, at the time he is committing illegal sexual intercourse is not a believer; and a person, at the time of drinking an alcoholic drink is not a believer; and a thief, at the time of stealing, is not a believer.

— Sahih al-Bukhari 5578

Islamic countries have low rates of alcohol consumption. However, a minority of Muslims do drink and believe consuming alcohol is not Qur'anically forbidden (haram).

=== Before the prohibition ===
According to Sunni hadiths (which are not universally accepted by Muslims), the prohibition of alcohol came many years after Muhammad had started his mission. It is reported that Jābir ibn Abd Allah (جابِر بن عَبْد الله) narrated: "Some people drank alcoholic beverages in the morning [of the day] of the 'Uhud battle and on the same day they were killed as martyrs, and that was before wine was prohibited." 'Anas ibn Mālik (أَنَس بن مالِك) narrated that the people said: "...some people [Muslims] were killed in the Battle of 'Uhud while wine was in their stomachs.' [...] So Allah revealed: 'There is not upon those who believe and do righteousness [any] blame concerning what they have eaten [in the past] if they [now] fear Allah and believe and do righteous deeds...'" [sura 5:93]

=== Permitted alcohol use in separate islamic divisions ===
==== Bektashi Order ====
Rakia, a fruit brandy, is used as a sacramental element by the Bektashi Order, and Alevi Jem ceremonies, where it is not considered alcoholic and is referred to as "dem".

=== Alawism ===
Various Alawite rituals involve the drinking of wine and the sect does not prohibit the consumption of alcoholic drinks on its adherents.

== Jainism ==
In Jainism, no kind of alcohol consumption is allowed, neither are there any exceptions like occasional or social drinking. The most important reason against alcohol consumption is the effect of alcohol on the mind and soul. In Jainism, any action or reaction that alter or impacts the mind is violence (himsa) towards own self, which is a five-sense human being. Violence to other five sense beings or to own self is violence. Jains do not consume fermented foods or drinks (beer, wine and other alcohols) to avoid killing of a large number of microorganisms associated with the fermenting process.

== Judaism ==
In Jewish tradition, wine holds an essential place in various religious rituals and celebrations. Many Jews embrace a moderate and responsible approach to alcohol, often emphasized during religious observances and social gatherings. While alcohol is integral to these sacred rituals, Jewish teachings also promote moderation and temperance, encouraging individuals to avoid excessive drinking. This approach aligns with a broader commitment to health and well-being. Wine is used during the Sabbath and festival meals as part of the Kiddush blessing, which sanctifies the day and acknowledges the sanctity of the occasion. Wine also plays a prominent role in the Passover Seder, where participants drink four cups of wine to symbolize the four expressions of redemption mentioned in the Torah. Moreover, wine is used in the Jewish wedding ceremony, where the bride and groom share a cup of wine under the chuppah (wedding canopy) as a symbol of their union and commitment to one another. Additionally, Jewish communities may provide support and resources for those struggling with alcohol-related issues, reflecting a compassionate and community-centered approach to addressing alcohol problems.

=== The Torah ===
The biblical narrative records the positive and negative aspects of wine.

Wine is a beverage of significance and import, utilized in ceremonies, for example, celebrating Abraham's military victory and successful liberation of Lot, festive meals, and the libations comprising the sacrificial service.

In Gen. 9:20–27, Noah becomes intoxicated from his wine on exiting the ark and lies unclothed in his tent where his youngest son, Ham, discovers Noah asleep, and "views his (Noah's) nakedness." Noah becomes aware of this the following day and curses Ham's son Canaan. In Gen. 19:31–37, in the aftermath of the destruction of Sodom and Gomorrah, Lot became inebriated on wine and had sexual intercourse with his two daughters. Moab (the father of the biblical nation by the same name) and Ben-Ammi (the father of the nation of Ammon) were born to Lot of this incest with his daughters. Religious service in the Temple must be void of consumption of alcohol or wine, as the priests are admonished, "Do not drink wine nor strong drink... when you enter the tabernacle of the congregation, lest you die."

=== In halakha ===
Halakha (Jewish law) mandates the use of wine in various religious ceremonies (such as sanctifying the Sabbath and festivals with wine at their start and conclusion, and at circumcision and at marriage ceremonies). The beverage required as "wine" by Jewish law generally permits the use of a non-alcoholic grape extraction (grape juice) for all ceremonies requiring wine. When necessary (i.e., when wine and grape juice are both unavailable), other beverages are also permitted for kiddush.

Excessive consumption and drunkenness, however are discouraged. According to the thirteenth century Orchot Chaim, as quoted in Beit Yosef "inebriation is entirely prohibited and there is no greater sin than drunkenness" and it is "the cause of many sins".

A Nazirite voluntarily takes a vow to abstain from grapes or any of their byproducts (including wine), he refrains cutting the hair on his head, and he may not become ritually impure by contact with corpses or graves. While one motivation for becoming a Nazirite may be a reaction to "risky behaviors" associated with alcohol use disorder (Tractate Sotah, BT 2a), the term of the vow of the Nazirite is ordinarily a fixed term, with grapes and wine again permitted at the end of the term.

=== Contemporary Judaism ===
Anecdotal evidence supports that Jewish communities, on the whole, view alcoholic consumption more negatively than Protestant Christian groups. The small sample of Jews viewed alcohol as destructive while a sample of Protestants referred to it as "relaxing". The proliferation of "kiddush clubs" in some synagogues, and the institutional backlash to that proliferation, however, may provide an indication of growing awareness of alcohol use disorder issues in Jewish communities. A number of specifically Jewish non-profit addiction rehabilitation and education programs, such as the Chabad Residential Treatment Center in Los Angeles and Retorno in Israel, provide treatment for alcohol use disorder (and other substance use disorders) within a specifically Jewish framework for recovery. The non-profit Jewish institutions are supplemented by for-profit rehab centers with a Jewish focus.

== Shinto ==
Sake is often consumed as part of Shinto purification rituals. Sakes served to kami (gods) as offerings prior to drinking are called Omiki (お神酒). People drink Omiki with gods to communicate with them and to solicit rich harvests the following year.

Additionally, the sharing of sake between participants in a Shinto ceremony is seen as a means of fostering friendship and strengthening the bonds within the community.

== Sikhism ==
An initiated Sikh cannot use or consume intoxicants, of which wine is one. Sikh rehtnamas (ethical codes) and hymns from the Guru Granth Sahib are both used to support the Sikh prohibitions on using mind-altering substances.

Despite the prohibitions on substance use, some Sikh individuals do still use alcohol and other intoxicants. In Sikh beliefs, one who becomes addicted to or dependent upon substances may be seen as following the path of the manmukh, the individualized and ego-oriented person. The solution, according to Sikh traditions, is to turn to the path of the gurmukh, a process of self-integration and devotion to unity with the primordial essence of the universe known as EkOnkar. Due to the prohibition on using mind-altering substances, some Sikh individuals struggle to seek help with substance use disorders due to stigma.

== Taoism ==
In Taoist rituals and practices, alcohol also plays a role as an offering and a means of connecting with the divine. An alcoholic beverage is often used in religious ceremonies and as an offering to the ancestors. The use of alcohol in Taoist rituals can symbolize purification, blessings, and the establishment of a sacred space. In these instances, the consumption of alcohol is done in a controlled and mindful manner, reflecting the Taoist emphasis on balance and harmony.

== Thelema ==
Aleister Crowley wrote The Gnostic Mass in 1913 while travelling in Moscow, Russia. The structure is similar to the Mass of the Eastern Orthodox Church and Roman Catholic Church, communicating the principles of Crowley's Thelema. It is the central rite of Ordo Templi Orientis and its ecclesiastical arm, Ecclesia Gnostica Catholica.

The ceremony calls for five officers: a Priest, a Priestess, a Deacon, and two adult acolytes, called "the Children". The end of the ritual culminates in the consummation of the eucharist, consisting of a goblet of wine and a Cake of Light, after which the congregant proclaims "There is no part of me that is not of the gods!"

== Vodou ==
In the Vodou faith of Haiti, alcoholic drinks such as rum and especially Clairin are consumed to be able to allow spirits called "lwa" to enter one's body and help them find the motivation for or strength to survive everyday struggles or life. In these ceremonies, all are expected to consume some alcohol, with the oungan being expected to imbibe the most. After entering the oungan's body, lwa often request more alcohol.

== Historical religions ==
=== Ancient Egyptian religion ===
In Ancient Egyptian religion, beer and wine were drunk and offered to the gods in rituals and festivals. Beer and wine were also stored with the mummified dead in Egyptian burials. Other ancient religious practices like Chinese ancestor worship, Sumerian and Babylonian religion used alcohol as offerings to gods and to the deceased. The Mesopotamian cultures had various wine gods and a Chinese imperial edict (c. 1,116 B.C.) states that drinking alcohol in moderation is prescribed by Heaven.

=== Ancient Greek religion ===
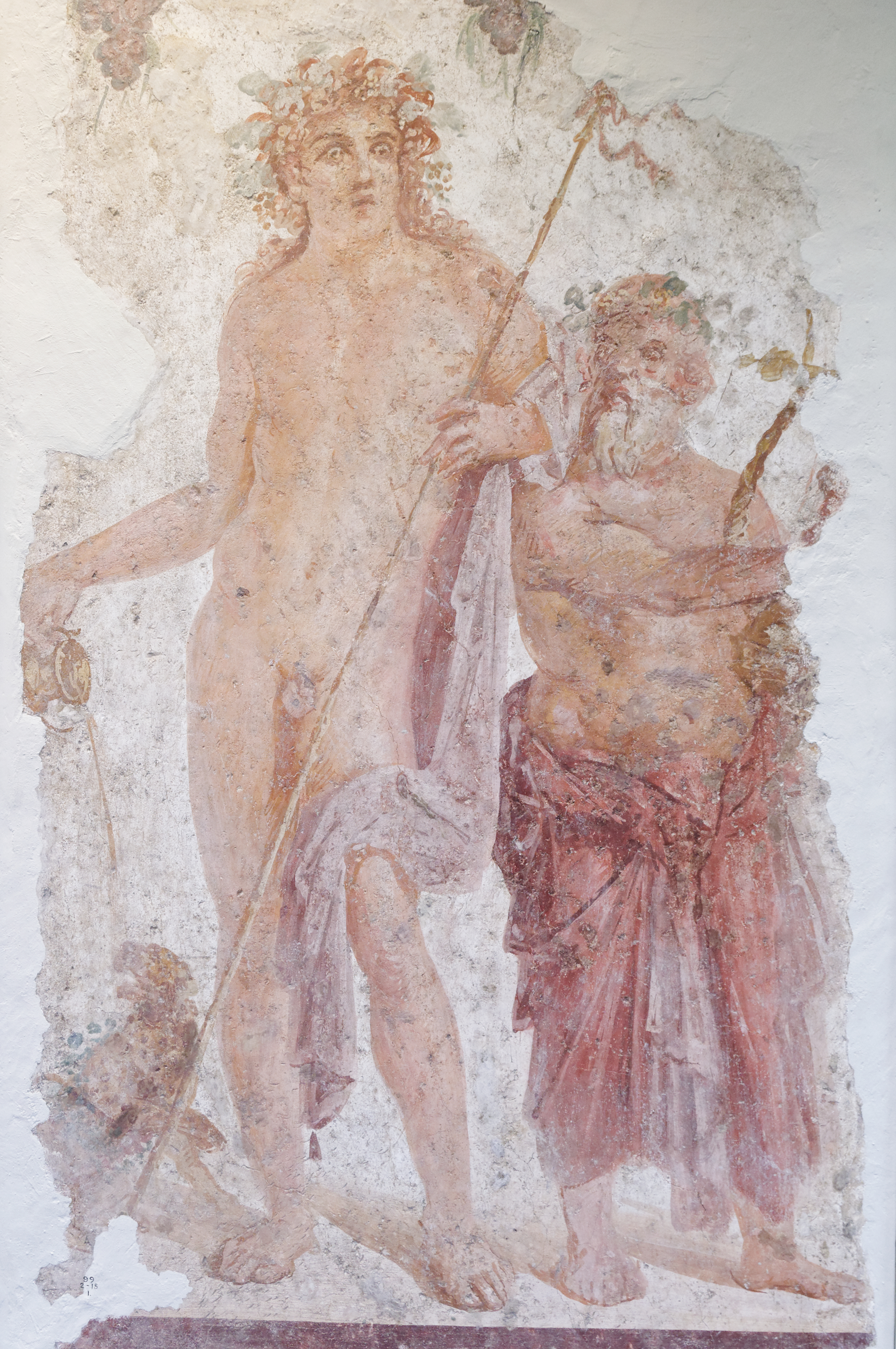
Bacchus pours wine from a cup for a panther, while Silenus plays the lyre, c. 30 BC.

In the ancient Mediterranean world, the Cult of Dionysus and the Orphic mysteries used wine as part of their religious practices. During Dionysian festivals and rituals, wine was drunk as way to reach ecstatic states along with music and dance. Intoxication from alcohol was seen as a state of possession by spirit of the god of wine Dionysus. Religious drinking festivals called Bacchanalia were popular in Italy and associated with the gods Bacchus and Liber. These Dionysian rites were frequently outlawed by the Roman Senate.

=== Mesoamerican religion ===
==== Maya ====
The Maya used enemas, a procedure in which liquid or gas is injected into the rectum, to manage certain substances in order to intensify the effect of the drug. Archaeological evidence provides us with ceramic goods that depict images in which psychedelic enemas were utilized in rituals; some figures are vomiting while others receive enemas. The paintings on ceramic vessels from the Mayan late classic period show pots overflowing with foam from fermented drinks, depict individuals talking to one another as they receive enemas.

The Maya also consumed an alcoholic beverage called balché, which is an infusion of the bark of Lonchocarpus longistylus (see page Lonchocarpus violaceus) mixed with honey from bees fed on a type of morning glory with a high ergine content. Intoxication was associated with the practice of divination, a ritual meant to facilitate direct interaction with the spirits to foretell the future or understand events that would otherwise be unclear, including illness, a shift in fortune, and the results of war. Since the alcoholic content of balaché seemed to have been relatively low, it had to be ingested in large quantities to reach a significant level of drunkenness.

=== Norse religion ===
In the Norse religion the drinking of ales and meads was important in several seasonal religious festivals such as Yule and Midsummer as well as more common festivities like wakes, christenings and ritual sacrifices called blóts.

== Health ==
Research has been conducted by social scientists and epidemiologists to see if correlations exist between religiosity and alcoholism. It showed that, in Ireland, religious teenagers have a more restricted attitude towards alcohol, but the study was limited to Christianity. By contrast, in America, the extent of the correlation between alcohol consumption and religion depended upon religious denomination.

The association between drinking alcohol and one's religious affiliation has been the subject of research, which has shown that it is not always the same across religions. Due to the moral and social precepts of their religion, several religious groups place a strong emphasis in control, which results in lower rates of alcohol consumption among its followers. In contrast, risk factors may support or tolerate excessive alcohol consumption within some religious communities.

In James B. Holt, Jacqueline W. Miller, Timothy S. Naimi and Daniel Z. Sui work, titled "Religious Affiliation and Alcohol Consumption in the United States," provides a comprehensive examination of the relationship between religious affiliation and alcohol consumption within the United States. The study observes the distinct pattern within the religious groups. Some denominations have traditionally upheld temperance as a core value, which results in lower rates of alcohol consumption due to the moral and societal teachings of their faith. On the other hand, they study also underscores the presence of risk factors within certain religious communities where excessive alcohol may be use, tolerates, or even encourages. Understanding these nuances is crucial for public health initiatives and interventions aimed at reducing alcohol related problems within specific religious contexts.

== Consumption of alcohol and religious affiliation in the United States ==
Amid the medical world's reappraisal of alcohol’s health effects, the proportion of Americans who believe even moderate alcohol consumption—one or two drinks per day—is bad for one’s health has doubled. Concurrently, the number of people who report drinking alcohol has declined.

In the US in the 2020s, people who attend religious services less often are more responsible for an overall decline in the rate of alcohol consumption (other chart) than regular attendees. This effect is partially due to the declining portion of religious individuals in the country.

Alcohol consumption in America and its connection to religious affiliation is a significant sociological and cultural issue. In the United States, different religious traditions have different views on alcohol, ranging from full abstinence in certain faiths to the promotion of responsible and moderate usage in others. This variety reflects the varied society of the nation, where followers of many faiths deal with alcohol in various ways.

The research article titled "Religious Affiliation and Alcohol Consumption in the United States" by James B. Holt, Jacqueline W. Miller, Timothy S. Naimi, and Daniel Z. Sui, provides a comprehensive analysis of the connection. This study offers important insights on the patterns of alcohol use among people based on their religious affiliations by drawing on vast data. Based on the research, studies have shown that alcohol consumption is greater in the Northeast, the Midwest, and the West and that consumption tends to be greater in metropolitan areas than in nonmetropolitan areas.

In addition, Gayle M. Wells' study titled "The Effect of Religiosity and Campus Alcohol Culture on Collegiate Alcohol Consumption," the complex relationship between religiosity, campus culture, and alcohol consumption among college students is meticulously examined. By employing reference group theory as a theoretical framework, Wells explores the ways in which the behavior and attitudes of peers and the broader campus environment impact the alcohol consumption patterns of college students who may hold varying levels of religiosity. The research reveal that students who identify as highly religious (e.g., attending religious services regularly, engaging in religious practices) are less likely to consume alcohol and engage in binge drinking compared to their less religious peers. This outcome could be attributed to the strong moral and religious values held by highly religious students, which discourage alcohol consumption. However, even among highly religious students, those who are exposed to a pervasive campus alcohol culture are more likely to engage in alcohol consumption compared to their counterparts in a more alcohol-restricted campus environment.

== See also ==
- Food and drink prohibitions
- Religion and drugs
- Sacred food as offering
