= Illinois Cannabis Regulation and Tax Act =

2019 U.S. state law

Cannabis Regulation and Tax Act

101st Illinois General Assembly
- Citation: 410 ILCS 705 et seq. Public Act 101-27
- Enacted by: Illinois Senate
- Passed by: Illinois House of Representatives
- Passed: May 31, 2019
- Signed by: Governor J. B. Pritzker
- Effective: January 1, 2020

Legislative history

Initiating chamber: Illinois Senate
- Bill title: Senate Bill 7
- Passed: May 29, 2019

Revising chamber: Illinois House of Representatives
- Bill title: House Bill 1438
- Passed: May 31, 2019
- Status: Current legislation

The Cannabis Regulation and Tax Act (Illinois House Bill 1438) is an act legalizing and regulating the production, consumption, and sale of cannabis in Illinois. It was approved by both houses by May 31, 2019 and came into effect January 1, 2020.

It marked the first act of a U.S. state legislature creating a regulated cannabis system (versus a voter initiative as enacted in Colorado, Washington State and California, or an unregulated system as in Vermont or the District of Columbia).

== History ==
=== Background ===
State Senator Heather Steans introduced a legalization bill in 2018 that did not pass. In 2018, J. B. Pritzker ran for Governor of Illinois on a platform to legalize cannabis, among other issues, and was elected in November, 2018. A 2017 poll conducted by Illinois Policy Institute showed over 70% support in the state for legalization and regulation.

=== 2019 legislation ===
Senate Bill 7, a legalization shell bill, was introduced in early April 2019. Provisions of the bill were announced on May 4. SB7 was passed by the Senate May 29. The bill became House Bill 1438. During debates, Rep. Anthony DeLuca reenacted the 1987 This Is Your Brain on Drugs anti-drug PSA on the House floor. HB 1438 was amended and passed by the House of Representatives on May 31. Sponsors of the legislation were Senator Heather Steans and Rep. Kelly Cassidy.

== Provisions ==
Under the act, personal possession of up to 30 grams of cannabis is legal for Illinois residents at least 21 years of age, with lower limits for non-residents.

The bill contains expungement provisions supported by civil liberties advocates. Around 700,000 marijuana-related police records and court convictions are expected to qualify to be erased under the bill. Cases of marijuana possession under 30 grams will automatically be expunged. Cases involving more than 30 grams will require court approval to be expunged.

The bill contains social equity provisions, including license application benefits for social equity applicants and $12,000,000 in funding for social equity programs.

The bill allows for local communities to decide whether or not to allow cannabis-related businesses, collect additional taxes, and establish zoning requirements.

The act created the position of Illinois Cannabis Regulation Oversight Officer within the Illinois Department of Financial and Professional Regulation, and the Adult Use Cannabis Health Advisory Committee within the Illinois Department of Human Services.

== Reactions ==
Clergy for a New Drug Policy supported the bill, as did civil liberties advocates. It was opposed by a group called Healthy and Productive Illinois, associated with Smart Approaches to Marijuana; Illinois Sheriffs' Association and the Illinois Association of Chiefs of Police; and by No Weed Illinois which included Peter B. Bensinger, the former U.S. Drug Enforcement Administration director and Illinois Department of Corrections director, and a group called Marijuana Victims Alliance.
