= Neo-American Church =

Religion based in drug use

Seal of the Church. The Three-Eyed Toad shows the absurdist/humorous/satirical bent of the church (the Church's house organ was titled "Divine Toad Sweat"). The motto ("Victory Over Horseshit!") was taken seriously: Timothy Leary himself was excommunicated in 1973 for "excessive horse shit".

The Original Kleptonian Neo-American Church (OKNeoAC), mostly shorted Neo-American Church, is a religious organization based on the use of psychedelic drugs (the "True Host") as a sacrament.

The psychedelic churches exist to promote and defend the psychedelic religion, a religion which sees in the transcendental experience produced by the sacred substances the key to understanding life and improving the condition of man on earth.

— Arthur Kleps, Testimony before the [United States] Senate Subcommittee on Juvenile Delinquency, May 25, 1966

== Founding ==
The Church was founded in 1965 or 1966 at Cranberry Lake, New York, by Arthur Kleps, a participant in Timothy Leary's circle based at the Hitchcock Estate in Millbrook, New York. The organization was founded partly as an absurdist religion, partly as a religious expression of the psychedelic movement, and partly as a device to gain religious exemption from American drug laws such as those outlawing LSD.

Church clergy, known as Boo Hoos, (Note: "Boo-hoo" or "big boo-hoo" (now archaic) was an obscure and mildly derisory 20th-century American slang term for "important person", similar to "muckety-muck" or "big shot"; it was used ironically by the Church.) claimed LSD as a sacrament. The original primary religious text of the church was The Boo Hoo Bible: The Neo-American Church Catechism and Handbook (1967), written by Kleps, a mixed-media work integrating comics, news clippings, senate testimonies, and political-religious diatribes. The Boo Hoo Bible has been described as "requiring its reader to transcend the personal in an act that simultaneously simulates and dissimulates, establishing and overcoming the ironic.... present[ing] a cosmology of simultaneity, which Kleps considers essential to psychedelic experience. A radical solipsism emerges that sees all conscious and unconscious life as part of one dream where meaning-making becomes completely associative"; it also includes the declaration that the ultimate goal of mankind is (or should be) the bombardment and destruction of the planet Saturn (which hoped-for event was depicted on the book's cover).

The Boo Hoo Bible was supplemented or superseded by Kleps' later book Millbrook: A Narrative of the Early Years of American Psychedelianism (1975, with new editions in 1977 and 2005) which provides an account of Kleps' founding of the organization along with a narrative of his experiences at the Hitchcock estate in Millbrook, New York, between 1963 and 1970, and describes the church's principles and doctrine as of the date of publication. Millbrook also includes philosophical interpretations of psychedelic experience and synchronicity and social and political commentary on aspects of the psychedelic movement.

We think it is very important not to take ourselves too seriously in terms of social structure, in terms of organizational life. We tend to view organizational life as sort of a game that people play.

— Arthur Kleps, Testimony before the [United States] Senate Subcommittee on Juvenile Delinquency, 1966

While it incorporated whimsical or even absurdist motifs – for instance, Church hymns included "Puff the Magic Dragon" and "Row, Row, Row Your Boat" (with its solipsistic refrain of "Life is but a dream"), which fact did not help them in establishing their bona fides as a serious religion to the judge in United States vs. Kuch (see below) – this mainly extended to matters of form and organization. The actual theology was fully formed, serious, and culturally revolutionary in intent. Kleps testified that the absurdist elements of the Church were intended to show that all religions are invented and silly.

== United States vs. Kuch ==
The Native American Church (no relation) was around this time fighting successfully in several state courts to uphold its legal permission to use peyote (normally a banned substance) in religious ceremonies; the Neo-American Church hoped to gain the same right, by analogy. One of the Church's ministers, Judith H. Kuch, was arrested and put on federal trial on narcotics charges in 1968. Kuch claimed that her use of LSD was a religious requirement.

The judge ruled that the Church's rituals did not merit protection under the First Amendment as he could find no evidence of "a religious discipline, a ritual, or tenets to guide one's daily existence" and that "...the [Neo-American Church] membership is mocking established institutions [and] playing with words... There is a conscious effort to assert in passing the attributes of religion but obviously only for tactical purposes" and that "[i]t is clear that the desire to use drugs and to enjoy drugs for their own sake, regardless of religious experience, is the coagulant of this organization and the reason for its existence." This was an instance, rare in American Constitutional jurisprudence, of a judge finding as an issue of fact that someone does not actually hold the religious views she professes. (Regardless of the merits of the religion, the judge in any case found substantial state interest in denying the exemption.)

== Later years ==
All members of the Original Kleptonian Neo-American Church subscribe to the following three principles: 1) The psychedelic substances, such as cannabis and LSD, are religious sacraments... 2) The use of the psychedelic sacraments is a basic human right. 3) We do not encourage the ingestion of the greater sacraments such as LSD and mescaline by those who are unprepared and we define preparedness as familiarity with the lesser sacraments such as cannabis and nitrous oxide and with solipsist-nihilist epistemological reasoning...

— Original Kleptonian Neo-American Church website

The Church reached its greatest notoriety around the time of this 1968 United States of America vs. Kuch case but continues into the 21st century as a small, loose organization. Membership in the Church is loosely defined but is based on assent to three principles: holding the psychedelic substances as sacraments, claiming their use as a basic human right, and defining enlightenment as "the recognition that life is a dream and the externality of relations an illusion (solipsistic nihilism)".

== See also ==
- Psychedelic church
