= Clergy for a New Drug Policy =

American organization seeking to reform drug laws

Clergy for a New Drug Policy (CNDP) is an American organization of religious leaders which seeks to reform drug laws in the interest of social justice. The group was begun in 2015 by Chicago United Church of Christ pastor Reverend Al Sharp. They focus on the adverse effects of the war on drugs including how it has disproportionately impacted low income and minority communities, specifically African Americans. Instead of punishment for drug users, which they have pointed out has not worked in reducing drug usage and crimes within the United States, the organization advocates for a rehabilitation-focused method of fighting addiction. They cite programs like Vancouver's “Insite Supervised Injection Site”, which provides drug addicts with clean needles, medical care, and access to addiction therapists as inspiration for the organization's policy. CNDP initiatives also practice the Four Pillars Drug Strategy first established in Europe, which focuses on four principles: harm reduction, prevention, treatment, and enforcement. While the group focuses primarily on drug reform (mainly Marijuana regulation and legalization), they also look for this change in policy to be a part of a greater movement focusing on social equity and prison reform, including tackling recidivism. The group is composed of members of Catholic, Quaker, Muslim, Protestant, Jewish and Unitarian Universalist clergy.

Commentary on the group described it as part of a phenomenon where "clergy in many denominations, beginning with Unitarian Universalists, have recognized that the war [on drugs] is lost, and that new strategies are needed" including harm reduction.

== Religious Influences of the Organization ==
The Clergy for New Drug Policy cites the theology of punishment for their stance against harsh penalties for drug users, specifically how many religious doctrines, including Christianity and Buddhism, call for penalty to be a reformative process for the offender. They believe that the penal system for drug offenders, especially in cases of recidivist addicts, can "brand people for life", as a result not allowing them to grow as individuals. Consequently, founded in part on Protestant Christian doctrine through Reverend Sharp, the organization takes a strong stance against the institutional racism present in the war on drugs and continuing into everyday society within the United States. In this regard, clergy members cite the Bible and the Qur'an among many other pieces of Holy Scripture to argue against the inherent inequalities created by the unfair enforcement they feel is present in modern-day American drug policy.

== Advocacy by CNDP ==
Delegates from the organization have been sent to various state and national houses of legislature to argue for the further legalization (and subsequent regulation) of marijuana. However, the group also has the goal of making sure these policies are implemented equally for all and remove arbitrary barriers to entry into the industry. Examples of CNDP cannabis activism include efforts in Arizona, where they called for Arizonans to support Proposition 205 to legalize cannabis in the state and later Proposition 207 (which was later passed into law in 2020) and in Maryland where activists spoke to state representatives and government officials in order to gain support for marijuana as a legal industry. Furthermore, the Clergy for a New Drug Policy were instrumental in the fight for the legalization of cannabis within their home state of Illinois. This idea was passed into law in 2019 through the Illinois Cannabis Regulation and Tax Act, which also expunges criminal records of anyone arrested or imprisoned due to marijuana offenses and implements social equity requirements within the state cannabis industry.

Along with individual endeavors as an organization, the Clergy for a New Drug Policy has also worked with a number of other activist groups to promote drug reform on both federal and state levels across the country. As a part of the Marijuana Justice Coalition, which looks to repair “the disproportionate harm faced by Black, brown, and low-income communities” as a result of federal drug policy, and the Drug Policy Alliance, CNDP reformers successfully pushed for the passage of the MORE Act in both the 116th and 117th Congresses. They have also worked alongside other Clergy groups as a means to fight against the continuation of the war on drugs and mandatory minimums. Throughout the 2010s and into 2020, Reverend Al Sharp and other delegates of CNDP traveled to Connecticut to rally in support of the legalization of cannabis in the state alongside local religious figures, including Reverend and representative Charlie Stallworth. This activism helped push through Senate Bill 1201, which fully legalized the drug within the state in 2021.

== Partner organizations ==
- American Civil Liberties Union
- Community of Congregations
- Community Renewal Society
- Drug Policy Alliance
- Justice Advisory Council – Cook County
- Justice Not Jails
- Illinois Justice Project
- Law Enforcement Against Prohibition
- Live4Lali
- Marijuana Policy Project
- Moms United to End the War on Drugs
- National Harm Reduction Coalition
- Samuel DeWitt Proctor Conference
- Treatment Alternatives for Safe Communities
