= Marijuana Policy Project =

American organization

- Abbreviation: MPP
- Formation: 1995
- Legal status: Non-profit organization
- Headquarters: Washington, D.C.
- Region served: United States
- President and CEO: Toi Hutchinson
- Website: mpp.org

The Marijuana Policy Project (MPP) is the largest organization working solely on marijuana policy reform in the United States in terms of its budget, number of members, and staff.

MPP advocates taxing and regulating the possession and sale of marijuana in a manner similar to alcohol, envisions a nation where marijuana education is honest and realistic, and believes treatment for problem marijuana users should be non-coercive and geared toward reducing harm.

The organization and its various ballot initiatives has largely been funded by the late billionaire Peter B. Lewis, and now by his family. Marijuana Policy Project estimated that the market of legal cannabis will reach US$57 billion in 2030.

== History ==
Marijuana Policy Project (MPP) co-founders Rob Kampia, Michael Kirshner, and Chuck Thomas previously worked at the National Organization for the Reform of Marijuana Laws (NORML). In 1995, after months of internal debate, NORML director Richard Cowan fired a staffer who had been pressing him for organizational change. Kampia, Kirshner and Thomas departed immediately thereafter and began creating their own organization, implementing ideas they had futilely pursued at NORML. On January 25, 1995, the three activists incorporated the Marijuana Policy Project (MPP) as a not-for-profit organization in the District of Columbia. Kampia served as MPP's executive director until December 2017. Matthew Schweich, who joined MPP as the director of state campaigns in early 2015, served as interim executive director until August 2018, when the organization named Steven W. Hawkins its new executive director. In December 2021, Hawkins stepped down and Toi Hutchinson was appointed president and CEO.

MPP has grown to over 40,000 dues-paying members and is the largest marijuana policy reform group in the United States. The organization has approximately 35 staffers and an annual budget of about $5 million.

== Organization ==
MPP, like many advocacy groups, is divided into two legal entities: a lobbying group and a public education group. The education branch may accept tax-deductible donations but cannot attempt to influence politics. The lobby group, however, may use its funds to directly influence politicians. MPP reports that all funding comes from individual contributions of more than 40,000 members, which are from every U.S. state, Puerto Rico, Great Britain, Canada, Australia, and other countries.

== State legislative victories ==
Delaware

In June 2015, the Delaware Legislature passed and Gov. Jack Markell signed a bill to reduce the penalty for possession of up to an ounce of marijuana to a simple fine. MPP led the two-year lobbying effort for the law, which reduces the penalty for possession of up to an ounce of marijuana to a civil fine for adults 21 and older. Minors under the age of 18 will be subject to a $100 criminal fine, while those between 18 and 21 will be subject to a $100 civil fine for a first offense and a $100 criminal fine for a second offense.

In May 2011, the Delaware Legislature passed and Gov. Jack Markell signed SB 17, which allows qualified, registered patients to obtain three ounces of marijuana every 14 days from state-regulated compassion centers. MPP led the two-year grassroots and lobbying efforts to pass the bill, which is based on MPP's model bill. This made Delaware the 16th state, plus the District of Columbia, to adopt a medical marijuana law.

District of Columbia

In March 2014, D.C. Mayor Vincent Gray signed a bill removing all criminal penalties for possession of up to an ounce of marijuana and replacing them with a civil fine of $25. Police will also no longer have grounds to search individuals simply based on the smell of marijuana. Before the bill can become law, however, it must undergo a 60-working-day review process in Congress. MPP, along with the Drug Policy Alliance (DPA) and the American Civil Liberties Union (ACLU), was instrumental in passing this legislation—by assisting with bill drafting, meeting with members of the D.C. Council, participating in working groups, testifying at hearings, and generating constituent advocacy in support of the bill.

Illinois

In August 2013, Gov. Pat Quinn signed medical marijuana legislation passed by the Illinois Legislature, making Illinois the 20th state to legalize medical marijuana. MPP lobbied for nearly 10 years in Springfield to bring about this state legislative victory. As many as 60 retail establishments will be licensed to sell medical marijuana to patients with cancer, AIDS, and other serious illnesses.

In July 2016, Illinois Gov. Bruce Rauner (R) signed a bill to reduce the penalty for up to 10 grams of marijuana from a criminal offense carrying possible jail time to a violation punishable by a non-criminal fine. MPP's lobbying team led the two-and-a-half-year advocacy effort, working closely with Clergy for a New Drug Policy and other allies.

Maryland

In April and May 2011, the Maryland General Assembly approved and Gov. Martin O'Malley signed an affirmative defense bill, removing criminal penalties from qualifying patients who possess up to an ounce of marijuana and establishing a work group to study a more comprehensive law. The bill improves upon a sentencing mitigation bill the legislature enacted in 2003, following four years of lobbying by MPP. MPP also played a leading role in the 2011 victory, including in-person lobbying, working with patients, and testifying before legislative committees.

In May 2013, Gov. O'Malley signed a research-oriented medical marijuana bill to allow teaching hospitals to apply to an independent commission to run medical marijuana programs. Gov. O'Malley also signed a bill that allows patients' designated caregivers to raise an affirmative defense for possession of medical marijuana.

In April 2014, Gov. Martin O'Malley signed legislation making Maryland the 21st medical marijuana state. MPP lobbied in support of medical marijuana legislation in Maryland for more than a decade. The legislation will allow state residents suffering from certain qualifying conditions to use medical marijuana if their doctors recommend it. It will also permit registered cultivators to grow medical marijuana and up to 15 licensed marijuana dispensaries to distribute the medicine to patients. Possession limits and regulations governing cultivation and marijuana dispensary facilities will be determined by a state-sanctioned commission prior to implementation.

Also in April 2014, Gov. Martin O'Malley signs legislation making Maryland the 18th state to decriminalize possession of small amounts of marijuana. The legislation makes possession of less than 10 grams of marijuana a civil offense punishable by a fine of up to $100 for a first offense, up to $250 for a second offense, and up to $500 for subsequent offenses. Third-time offenders and individuals under 21 years of age will be required to undergo a clinical assessment for substance abuse disorder and a drug education program. MPP is proud to be a member of the Marijuana Policy Coalition of Maryland, which led the charge for this sensible marijuana policy reform in Maryland.

Minnesota

In May 2014, Gov. Mark Dayton signed legislation making Minnesota the 22nd medical marijuana state. MPP and its local affiliate worked for several years to bring about the victory. The law allows qualifying patients to obtain preparations of marijuana from eight locations. It does not allow smoking.

New Hampshire

In July 2013, Gov. Maggie Hassan signed a bill approved by the New Hampshire Legislature to legalize medical marijuana, making New Hampshire the 19th medical marijuana state. MPP worked for several years to bring about this victory in the Granite State. The 2013 legislation will allow patients with serious illnesses to obtain marijuana from four nonprofit, state-licensed alternative treatment centers.

On July 18, 2017, Gov. Chris Sununu signed HB 640 into law, reducing penalties for possessing three quarters of an ounce or less of marijuana from a criminal misdemeanor to a civil violation punishable only by a fine. A fourth offense within three years would be a fine-only misdemeanor. Marijuana possession by those under 18 would be subject to the jurisdiction of juvenile court, and they would typically receive substance abuse education. MPP led the multi-year lobbying effort for the law.

New York

In July 2014, Gov. Andrew Cuomo signed legislation making New York the 23rd medical marijuana state. The law's passage is the product of many years of work by legislative champions, patients, their loved ones, and advocacy organizations, including MPP, Compassionate Care NY, and the Drug Policy Alliance. The new law will protect certain seriously ill patients who use marijuana pursuant to their doctors' advice from civil and criminal penalties. A number of modifications were made at the insistence of Gov. Cuomo. As a result, patients will not be allowed to smoke medical cannabis, the law will sunset after seven years, and there will be no more than five manufacturers—with a total of up to 20 locations—in the entire state. MPP continues work to improve the law.

Ohio

On June 8, 2016, Gov. John Kasich signed House Bill 523 into law, making Ohio the 25th state to adopt a workable medical marijuana law. The legislation, passed by the Ohio General Assembly the previous week, will allow seriously ill patients to use and purchase medical cannabis that will be cultivated and processed in-state. This legislation was a direct response to an initiative MPP funded and sought to qualify for the November 2016 ballot. Although the legislation isn't as strong as the constitutional amendment MPP promoted, it shares many of the same critical principles, most especially by ensuring seriously ill patients will no longer be treated like criminals and will have reasonable access to medicine. In conjunction with Ohioans for Medical Marijuana, MPP plans to continue advocacy efforts to ensure that the State of Ohio lives up to the promises contained in HB 523, while also working to better the program using the ballot initiative proposal as a roadmap for these improvements.

Pennsylvania

On April 17, 2016. Gov. Tom Wolf signed legislation making Pennsylvania the 24th medical marijuana state. Patients and their families led the effort for years, and MPP played a major supporting role beginning in mid-2015, bringing on a contract lobbyist and a staffer who devoted most of her time to Pennsylvania. MPP helped ensure the bill language was as strong as possible and worked on advocacy and communications, including creating videos of families from Campaign for Compassion. The new law is one of the stronger ones to pass through a legislature. Its broad list of qualifying conditions includes intractable pain and PTSD and up to 150 dispensaries will be allowed.

Rhode Island

In January 2006, the Rhode Island Legislature overwhelmingly overrode Gov. Donald Carcieri's veto of MPP's bill to protect medical marijuana patients from arrest, making Rhode Island the 11th medical marijuana state. This was the first state medical marijuana law to be enacted over the veto of a governor.

In June 2009, the Rhode Island Legislature again overwhelmingly overrode Gov. Carcieri's veto of MPP's bill to create "compassion centers" to provide medical marijuana to qualified patients, making Rhode Island the second state (after New Mexico) to license and regulate medical marijuana dispensing.

In June 2012, the Rhode Island Legislature passed and Gov. Lincoln Chafee signed twin bills to decriminalize the simple possession of marijuana. MPP led the three-year lobbying and grassroots effort for the bills, which reduce the penalty for possession of up to an ounce of marijuana to a $150 civil fine for most offenses.

Vermont

In May 2004, at the conclusion of MPP's intensive, three-year lobbying campaign, Vermont became the ninth state to enact a medical marijuana law—and only the second state (after Hawaii) to do so through its legislature, rather than through a ballot initiative. In May 2011, the Vermont Legislature approved S. 17, which added four non-profit marijuana dispensaries to the existing law. MPP played an instrumental role in passing this legislation, by funding a two-year lobbying effort and helping elect a governor who supports sensible marijuana policies.

In June 2013, Gov. Peter Shumlin signed legislation passed by the Vermont Legislature to decriminalize the simple possession of marijuana. MPP led the nearly four-year lobbying effort for the law, which reduces the penalty for possession of up to an ounce of marijuana to a civil fine for adults 21 and older. Minors will typically be required to complete diversion.

In January 2018, the Vermont Legislature passed a limited legalization bill, which will make it legal for adults to possess and grow limited amounts of marijuana. Gov. Phil Scott (R) said he will sign the bill into law. MPP's staff and lobbyists led advocacy efforts for medical marijuana, decriminalization, and legalization in Vermont for more than 15 years.

== Ballot initiatives ==
=== 2016 ===
Nine states voted on ballot measures to roll back marijuana prohibition on November 8, 2016. The Marijuana Policy Project supported initiative campaigns to regulate and tax marijuana like alcohol in Arizona, Maine, Massachusetts, and Nevada and was part of a coalition of groups that coordinated a ballot initiative campaign in California. MPP also provided assistance to initiative campaigns to legalize medical marijuana in Arkansas, Florida, and North Dakota. Montana voted on a measure to improve its existing medical marijuana law. All ballot measures were passed by voters except Arizona's Proposition 205.

=== Alaska ===
In November 2014, the Campaign to Regulate Marijuana Like Alcohol in Alaska, a ballot initiative campaign backed by MPP, successfully passed Ballot Measure 2, making Alaska the fourth state to end marijuana prohibition and replace it with a system in which marijuana is taxed and regulated like alcohol.

In 2004, MPP provided the majority of funding for an initiative to regulate marijuana in Alaska, which failed with 44% of the vote (but still set what was at the time the record for the largest vote to end marijuana prohibition in any state).

=== Arkansas ===
In November 2012, MPP backed Issue 5, a medical marijuana initiative in Arkansas, which narrowly failed, receiving 48.5% of the vote.

=== Arizona ===
In November 2016, Proposition 205—a ballot initiative campaign backed by MPP—did not successfully pass a ballot initiative to legalize, tax, and regulate marijuana for adult use.

In November 2010, the Arizona Medical Marijuana Policy Project, a ballot initiative campaign backed by MPP, successfully passed a ballot initiative making the use and possession of medical marijuana legal and establishing approximately 120 non-profit dispensaries around the state. This made Arizona the 15th state to adopt a medical marijuana law. In September 2013, the Marijuana Policy Project initiated a campaign to legalize marijuana in Arizona for recreational use.

=== California ===
In November 2016, Proposition 64—a legalization initiative supported by MPP—successfully passed a ballot initiative to legalize, tax, and regulate marijuana for adult use.

=== Colorado ===
In November 2012, the Campaign to Regulate Marijuana Like Alcohol, a ballot initiative campaign backed by MPP, successfully passed Amendment 64, making legal in Colorado the possession, use, production, distribution, and personal cultivation of marijuana. MPP also played a lead role in drafting and campaigning for the historic initiative.

=== District of Columbia ===
In November 2009, MPP successfully lobbied for the removal of the so-called "Barr Amendment" from the D.C. appropriations bill. MPP led the fight to end Congressional interference, which, for over 10 years, blocked the District of Columbia from implementing a medical marijuana initiative that passed with nearly 70% of the vote in 1998. MPP even retained the amendment's namesake, former Georgia Representative Bob Barr, to lobby for the amendment's removal after he reversed his position in 2007. Following the removal of the amendment, MPP successfully lobbied the District Council to improve the language they were considering to implement the initiative and lobbied the executive branch for reasonable regulations. The regulations went into effect on April 15, 2011.

=== Maine ===
In November 2016, Question 1—a legalization initiative supported by MPP—successfully passed a ballot initiative to legalize, tax, and regulate marijuana for adult use.

=== Massachusetts ===
In November 2016, Question 4—a legalization initiative supported by MPP—successfully passed a ballot initiative to legalize, tax, and regulate marijuana for adult use.

In November 2008, MPP's ballot initiative to remove the threat of arrest and jail for possessing an ounce or less of marijuana passed overwhelmingly in Massachusetts. The successful initiative—the first statewide decriminalization initiative ever—replaced the threat of arrest and jail with a $100 fine. The measure also eliminated criminal offender (CORI) reports as they pertain to arrests for simple marijuana possession, which, prior to the initiative, could have resulted in individuals being denied housing, jobs, or loans for college.

=== Michigan ===
Also in November 2008, 63% of Michigan voters passed a medical marijuana ballot initiative spearheaded by MPP"s campaign committee. The initiative—which received a majority of the vote in each of Michigan's 83 counties—permits terminally and seriously ill patients to use medical marijuana with their doctors' approval. Its passage made Michigan the 13th medical marijuana state and the first in the Midwest.

=== Montana ===
In November 2004, MPP funded and ran the campaign that succeeded in passing a statewide medical marijuana initiative in Montana with 62% of the vote.

=== Nevada ===
In November 2016, Question 2—a legalization initiative supported by MPP—successfully passed a ballot initiative to legalize, tax, and regulate marijuana for adult use.

In November 2006, MPP's high-profile ballot initiative to tax and regulate marijuana in Nevada received 44% of the vote, tying with Alaska for the then all-time largest vote ever to end marijuana prohibition in a state. (That number was since surpassed in November 2010, when 46% of California voters supported Proposition 19, a ballot initiative to regulate, tax, and control marijuana in the state.)

== Federal lobbying ==
MPP not only works to reform marijuana policy state-by-state in various states including Texas, but also on the federal level. Some of MPP's key federal goals include: building support for legislation that would treat marijuana like alcohol under federal law, persuading members of Congress to introduce and support legislation designed to protect medical marijuana patients and providers, monitoring the Department of Justice to ensure that the department honors its pledge to not prosecute individuals acting in compliance with state medical marijuana laws, generating media coverage to pressure the National Institute on Drug Abuse (NIDA) to provide marijuana for an FDA-approved study related to PTSD, and lobbying for passage of an amendment to a congressional appropriations bill that would eliminate all funding for the drug czar's office, among others.

Since MPP's founding, positive medical marijuana bills have been introduced in six consecutive Congresses. In addition, in the summers of 2003, 2004, 2005, 2006, and 2007, the U.S. House debated and voted on an appropriations amendment advocated for primarily by MPP.

In July 2003, 152 members of Congress voted in favor of the Hinchey amendment to the spending bill for the U.S. Justice Department. The legislation would have prevented the DEA from spending any money to raid or arrest medical marijuana patients and caregivers in states with medical marijuana laws.

In July 2007, following an intensive MPP lobbying campaign, MPP helped to garner 165 votes in the U.S. House of Representatives for the Hinchey Amendment—an all-time record of support for medical marijuana access.

In December 2009, MPP successfully lobbied for the removal of the "Barr Amendment" from the D.C. Appropriations bill. MPP led the fight to end Congressional interference, which, for over 10 years, blocked the District of Columbia from implementing a medical marijuana initiative that passed with over 70% of the vote. MPP even retained the amendment's namesake, former Georgia Rep. Bob Barr, to lobby for the amendment's removal after he reversed his position in 2007. Following the removal of the amendment, MPP successfully lobbied the District Council to improve the language they were considering to implement the initiative and lobbied the executive branch for reasonable regulations. Those regulations went into effect on April 15, 2011.

During the 112th session of Congress, MPP lobbied on behalf of several pending marijuana-related bills. For the first time ever, a bill to end federal marijuana prohibition was introduced. H.R. 2306, the Ending Federal Marijuana Prohibition Act of 2012, would have removed marijuana from the list of controlled substances and would have eliminated all federal penalties related to marijuana (except in cases where marijuana was transferred into another state in violation of that state's laws).

MPP is also lobbied on behalf of medical marijuana on the federal level. In May 2011, three bills to benefit medical marijuana patients and their providers were introduced in the U.S. House of Representatives. The "States' Medical Marijuana Patient Protection Act" would have modified federal law so that individuals acting in compliance with state law were immune from federal prosecution. The "Small Business Tax Equity Act of 2011" and the "Small Business Banking Improvement Act of 2011" addressed critical tax and banking issues faced by medical marijuana centers and dispensaries as they attempt to serve patients, comply with statewide regulations, and pay their fair share of taxes.

During the 113th session of Congress (2013-2014), in May 2014, the U.S. House of Representatives voted to end the federal government's war on medical marijuana. During a debate regarding a Justice Department funding bill, Rep. Dana Rohrabacher (R-CA), a longtime MPP ally, offered the Rohrabacher–Farr amendment to block DEA raids on medical marijuana dispensaries. It passed the House 219–189 and became law in December 2014. MPP played a key role in building support for this measure, meeting with Congressman Rohrabacher and former Congressman Maurice Hinchey on this amendment for more than a decade.

In addition, in December 2014, Congress passed a historic medical marijuana amendment as part of the federal spending bill, marking the first time in history that Congress approved legislation rolling back the federal government's war on medical marijuana patients and providers. The bill included an amendment that prohibits the Department of Justice—which includes the Drug Enforcement Administration—from using funds to interfere with state medical marijuana laws.

Currently, MPP continues to build support for legislation that would treat marijuana like alcohol under federal law, works with members of Congress on bills designed to protect and assist medical marijuana patients and providers, and increases public pressure on the Department of Justice to eliminate prosecutions of individuals acting in compliance with state marijuana laws, among other efforts.

== Sexual misconduct scandal ==
In August 2009, seven MPP staffers quit following an alleged incident of sexual misconduct by then executive director Rob Kampia involving a female staffer after an office happy hour. According to former employees, department heads at the organization unanimously asked Kampia to move into a different position than executive director after the incident. In January 2010, Kampia was "encouraged" by the MPP Board of Directors to take a three-month leave of absence, and his return was subject to "convincing the board he had dealt with his issues." In April 2010, Kampia returned to the organization after the leave of absence.

== War on Drug Czar ==
Deciding that government propaganda was a major obstacle to its ballot initiatives, MPP launched its "War on Drug Czar" campaign at the end of 2002, filing numerous complaints against Office of National Drug Control Policy chief John P. Walters. In a December 5, 2002 Reuters article, Rob Kampia proclaimed, "We want him out of the picture. We want him excommunicated from the federal government forever."

The complaints, filed with state officials, focused on ONDCP leaders' visits to Alaska, Montana, Nevada, and Oregon. Director John Walters traveled to Nevada and Oregon and Deputy Director Scott Burns traveled to Alaska and Montana to speak against marijuana reform initiatives. However, they did not file any campaign expense reports, which laws in those states require for persons or organizations spending money to either support or oppose ballot measures.

== TV and radio ad campaigns ==
In July 2006, MPP launched a radio advertising campaign that called out prominent public officials, including former President George W. Bush, former California Governor Arnold Schwarzenegger, former Vice President Al Gore, and Supreme Court Justice Clarence Thomas for using marijuana. The ad, which ran on 141 radio stations nationwide, asked: "Is it fair to arrest three-quarters of a million people a year for doing what presidents and a Supreme Court justice have done?"

In early July 2009, MPP introduced a television ad spot advocating taxing and regulating marijuana as a sensible policy change for California, a state facing a huge budget deficit. The ad featured a California woman explaining that responsible marijuana consumers, like herself, want a taxed and regulated system of marijuana distribution so that they can pay their fair share of taxes, which could then be put back into California schools. The ad was the first of its kind and was very controversial, with some California television stations refusing to air it. Nonetheless, the ad received a lot of press coverage, including an appearance on NBC's Today Show by MPP's former director of federal policies, Aaron Houston.

In July 2013, MPP aired a new ad at the Brickyard 400 NASCAR Race. In support of making marijuana legal for adults, the spoof beer ad highlighted the relative safety of marijuana compared to alcohol by characterizing marijuana as a "new 'beer'" with "no calories," "no hangovers," and "no violence" associated with its use. Although it was scheduled to air dozens of times on a jumbotron outside the entrance of the speedway, the ad ran for just a few hours before being pulled.

== See also ==
- Decriminalization of marijuana in the United States
- National Cannabis Industry Association
