= Flor da Mãe Divina =

Psychedelic church

- Formation: 2008; 18 years ago (legally approved since 2014)
- Founders: Vicki Kraft
- Type: Non-profit psychedelic church
- Location: Redondo Beach, California
- Website: flowerofthedivinemother.org

Flor da Mãe Divina, also known as Flower of the Divine Mother (FDMD), is a non-profit Santo Daime ayahuasca church located in Southern California. It was founded by Vicki Kraft and is located specifically in Redondo Beach, California. The church is notable in being one of only a handful of legal psychedelic churches in the United States. It was founded in 2008 and applied to the United States Drug Enforcement Administration (DEA) to legally operate in 2014, receiving approval 6 months later. Santo Daime is a Christianity-based syncretic religion, but Flor da Mãe Divina diverges from this and is instead about Christ consciousness (higher or divine consciousness) and the divine feminine.

== See also ==
- Psychedelic church
- Church of the Holy Light of the Queen
