= Arthur Kleps =

American psychologist and activist

Arthur John Kleps (April 17, 1928 – July 17, 1999) was a psychologist turned drug legalization advocate whose Neo-American Church defended the use of cannabis and hallucinogens (including LSD and mescaline) for spiritual enlightenment and exploration.

== Early life ==
Kleps was born in Manhattan on April 17, 1928 to a Lutheran minister and his wife. In 1952, he married Beverly Jean Rahn (born 1934), but the marriage was annulled in 1954. He was married in 1959 to a student at Syracuse University; at the time they met he was working as a psychologist at a prison in Auburn, New York. During this period, Kleps completed his B.S. at Utica College (then a subsidiary of Syracuse University) and earned an M.A. in school psychology from Syracuse proper; by 1959, he was employed as a psychologist at the Lynchburg Training School in Virginia. The institution is notable for its role as a state mental hospital that was challenged for its role in the forced sterilization of patients in Buck v. Bell (1927) and Poe v. Lynchburg Training School & Hospital (1981).

== Involvement in the psychedelic movement ==
In 1960, Kleps bought by mail from Delta Chemical Company in New York 1 g of mescaline sulfate and took 500 mg. He experienced a psychedelic trip that caused profound changes in his life and outlook. Kleps ceased employment with Lynchburg Training School, reportedly being fired in 1964 for writing a pro-marijuana paper. His wife divorced him in December 1966. Arthur Kleps joined Timothy Leary at Millbrook in 1967. He founded the Neo-American Church and sought protection for the right to use marijuana and hallucinogens as religious sacraments. He testified before the US Senate's Judiciary Committee in May 1966, defending citizens' rights to use these drugs to explore consciousness.

We are not drug addicts. We are not criminals. We are free men, and we will react to persecution the way free men have always reacted.

Eventually a test case in 1968 signaled the judiciary's unwillingness to extend the same rights to drug use to the Neo-American Church as is permitted to Native American tribes who use peyote for similar purposes. Kleps continued affiliation with the church.

He authored three books. History Of The Psychedelic Moment Cartoon And Coloring Book (1967; reprinted 2019; including Leary's review of the Neo-American Church's catechism) and The Boo Hoo Bible: The Neo-American Church Catechism and Handbook (1971; reprinted 2020) were largely superseded by a memoir-treatise, Millbrook: A Narrative of the Early Years of American Psychedelianism (1975; reprinted 1998, 2005, 2017). Millbrook provides an account of Kleps' founding of the organization along with a narrative of his experiences at the Hitchcock estate between 1963 and 1970, and describes the church's principles and doctrine as of the date of publication. The book also includes philosophical interpretations of the psychedelic experience and synchronicity and social and political commentary on aspects of the psychedelic movement.

== Later life ==
Kleps spent time in Europe, notably Amsterdam, where he accused American Express and the DEA of intercepting his mail containing travelers checks. He died July 17, 1999. His last official residence was in Sacramento, California.
