= Psychedelic Cults and Outlaw Churches =

- Author: Mike Marinacci
- Language: English
- Subject: Psychedelic churches
- Genre: Non-fiction
- Publisher: Park Street Press (Simon and Schuster)
- Publication date: July, 4 2023
- Publication place: Rochester, Vermont
- Pages: 384
- ISBN: 978-1644117071
- OCLC: 1345215557
- Website: simonandschuster.com/books/Psychedelic-Cults-and-Outlaw-Churches/Mike-Marinacci/9781644117071

Psychedelic Cults and Outlaw Churches: LSD, Cannabis, and Spiritual Sacraments in Underground America is a 2023 book about psychedelic churches and cults by independent researcher and writer Mike Marinacci. It is a comprehensive history of the previously largely unreviewed psychedelic church movement in North America in the 20th century.

The book covers 66 psychedelic churches that have operated in the United States, Canada, and Jamaica, including 18 main churches and 48 secondary smaller and less-well-known churches. Some examples of the churches covered include the Native American Church (NAC), the Peyote Way Church of God (PWCG), the League for Spiritual Discovery (LSD), the Neo-American Church (OKNeoAC), the Brotherhood of Eternal Love, the Church of the Tree of Life (TOLC), the Temple of the True Inner Light (TTIL), and the Psychedelic Venus Church (PVC), among many others. The book doesn't cover psychedelic churches in other parts of the world, for instance the Santo Daime church of Brazil.

The foreword of the book was written by the religious scholar and historian J. Christian Greer, who is notable for his work in the area of psychedelic religion and in coining the term "psychedelicism".

Book reviews of Psychedelic Cults and Outlaw Churches have been published.

== See also ==
- List of psychedelic literature
- Psychedelic church
- Counterculture of the 1960s
