= Dave Hodges (activist) =

American religious leader and activist

- Born: 1981 or 1982; Oakland, California
- Known for: Founding Church of Ambrosia
- Movement: Cannabis rights
- Website: https://ambrosia.church/pastor-dave-hodges/

David Hodges (born 1981 or 1982) is an American religious leader and cannabis and psychedelics activist, known for founding the Church of Ambrosia, a non-denominational religious organization based in Oakland, California.

Described as the "prophet of the shroom", Hodges and the Church of Ambrosia have been featured in media coverage relating to psychedelic spirituality, cannabis advocacy, and drug policy reform in the United States, particularly in relation to debates over the legal status and religious use of entheogenic substances.

== Career ==
=== Cannabis and activism ===
In 2009, Hodges founded the San Jose Cannabis Buyers Collective, also described as one of San Jose’s first medical cannabis collectives and later as a storefront dispensary. Hodges became a court-certified expert witness tied to Proposition 215.

By the early 2010s, he was also associated with SaveCannabis.org, A2C2, and policy-advising work.

=== Church of Ambrosia ===
In January 2019, Hodges founded Church of Ambrosia, a nondenominational religious organisation based in Oakland, California. The organization describes itself as a psychedelic church centered around the sacramental use of cannabis and psilocybin mushrooms. It has been described as part of a movement of contemporary psychedelic and entheogen-based religious organisations in the United States.

Hodges founded the organisation following a profound spiritual experience. According to the organisation, "Three luminous beings appeared and identified themselves to Dave, explaining why his life had unfolded the way it had."

== Bibliography ==
- Hodges, David F. Book of Ambrosia: A Modern Guide to Spirituality and Psychedelics. First edition.

== See also ==
- Church of Ambrosia
- Cannabis in the United States
