= Psychedelic syndrome =

- Other names: Chronic LSD syndrome; "Acid head" syndrome
- Specialty: Psychiatry
- Symptoms: Eccentricity, magical and superstitious beliefs, isolation from general society, others
- Causes: Chronic psychedelic use
- Treatment: Psychotherapy

Psychedelic syndrome, also known as chronic LSD syndrome or "acid head" syndrome, is a partially culture-bound psychological syndrome that was proposed to involve pronounced psychosocial and personality changes due to chronic or prolonged use of psychedelic drugs, namely LSD.

The syndrome was first proposed in 1969 by a physician and academic named David E. Smith, who was the founder and director of the Haight Ashbury Free Clinic (also known as the "Hippie Clinic") in the Haight-Ashbury district of San Francisco and who treated many people frequently using LSD. He was also an academic and the founder and editor of the Journal of Psychedelic Drugs (1967–present). In addition, Smith himself was a member of the counterculture and took LSD in the 1960s. Others made similar or analogous informal observations of related phenomena in the 1960s as well.

According to Smith, psychedelic syndrome resulted in profound alterations in psychosocial functioning and lifestyle. The symptoms of the syndrome were proposed to include belief in magic or magical concepts; intense study of "metaphysical objects"; superstition; belief in astrology; belief in mental telepathy, extrasensory perception (ESP), and telekinesis; mysticism; and isolation from general or mainstream society. Additional symptoms were said to include a profound belief in non-violence and rejection of physical aggression, with consequent frequent adoption of vegetarianism due to the rejection of killing; a deep desire to return to nature and more natural ways of being; and self-psychoanalytic, pseudoreligious, and creative aspirations. The symptoms were said to be uncharacteristic of the demographics of the individuals exhibiting them, for instance many of them being from middle-class homes, being above-average in intelligence, previously holding conventional beliefs, and having little background in mystical ideas. They were also said to not be consistent with schizophrenia, as cognitive abilities and intense interpersonal relationships remained intact, and the individuals could only be described as "eccentric". In addition, Smith has said that many people who just used psychedelics could function quite well for a long time, and that more serious problems occurred with amphetamines, heroin, and alcoholism.

People who were claimed to have had psychedelic syndrome often belonged to the psychedelic community or hippie subculture and frequently grouped together in communal living situations. They did not feel themselves to be mentally ill and were not considered sick by other members of their community. In addition, they did not usually view LSD as a recreational drug, but instead as a tool for psychotherapeutic and spiritual purposes. In relation to the preceding, psychedelic syndrome could only be considered a psychological aberration in terms of the established standards of the dominant culture. This was said to make "treatment" of the syndrome, such as psychotherapy, "virtually impossible", at least as long as the individuals continued to remain in their social groups. Psychological stress and crisis prompted by events like parental, spousal, or monetary pressure were said to usually precipitate "re-entry attempts" into "straight" society. Psychedelic syndrome was thought to be both due to the powerful effects of psychedelics as well as due to cultural influences. Aside from being a proposed clinical entity, the syndrome and its symptoms have been referred to as an "unstructured psychedelic religion". Contemporary assessments of psychedelic syndrome have been made and have attributed the conceptualization of the syndrome to the social conservatism of the dominant culture at the time. However, others have considered the syndrome with more credence and have noted that similar phenomena do not seem to occur with other psychoactive drugs.

Subsequent scientific research has reported that psychedelics seem to foster development of alternative perspectives on reality and soften conceptual boundaries. They have also since been found to produce lasting personality changes such as increased openness and self-transcendence, cause changes in cognitive flexibility, increase neuroplasticity, and reopen developmental windows or critical learning periods. In addition, psychedelics have been found to increase nature relatededness as well as pro-environmental behavior. They have been found to increase the quantity and subjective intensity of insights and thus beliefs, including false ones, as well. Moreover, psychedelics have been associated with supernatural thinking, religion, cults and cultishness, and guruism. Development of psychosis or schizophrenia due to use of psychedelics appears to be rare and more specific to those with pre-existing susceptibility.

A related concept is Josie Kins's informal "McKenna syndrome". She proposes that this syndrome involves heightened activation of spiritual or religious drives due to abundant use of psychedelics, and that it causes psychological changes including greater big-picture thinking, theorizing about reality or the universe and one's place in it, and compulsively evangelizing one's grand cosmic theories to the exclusion of other ideas.

== See also ==
- Psychedelic drug
- Hippie
- Counterculture of the 1960s
- Psychedelicism
- Hallucinogen-induced psychotic disorder
- Temple of the True Inner Light
