= Church of the Holy Light of the Queen =

Psychedelic church

- Formation: 1993; 33 years ago
- Founders: Jonathan Goldman; Jane Seligson
- Type: Psychedelic church
- Location: Ashland, Oregon
- Website: www.chlq.org

The Church of the Holy Light of the Queen (CHLQ) is a Santo Daime ayahuasca church located in Ashland, Oregon. It was founded by Jonathan Goldman and Jane Seligson in 1993. In 1999, federal agents seized a shipment of the church's ayahuasca, raided Goldman's home, and arrested him. However, he was not prosecuted. The church was warned against further practicing, which led them to continue their ceremonies in secrecy. In 2008, the CHLQ sued the federal government for their right to practice legally. In 2009, a federal court ruled that use of ayahuasca by the church was legal and protected in Church of the Holy Light of the Queen v. Mukasey. The church is notable in being one of only a handful of legal psychedelic churches in the United States.

== See also ==
- Psychedelic church
- Gonzales v. O Centro Espírita Beneficente União do Vegetal (2006)
- Flor da Mãe Divina (Flower of the Divine Mother)
