= Kiddush club =

"Kiddush club" is a slang term applied to an informal group of Jewish adults who congregate during Shabbat (Sabbath) prayer services to make kiddush over wine or liquor, and socialize. Traditionally it has been a male-bonding experience, especially in Orthodox communities.

== Custom ==
Kiddush clubs are a fixture of Saturday morning shacharit services in Orthodox, and particularly Modern Orthodox synagogues. In a typical kiddush club, members of the "club"–generally men–leave the synagogue's prayer hall during either the Torah reading, the haftarah reading or the rabbi's sermon which generally follows it, and go to another room in the synagogue to drink and socialize. Depending on the club, participants may or may not return to the prayer hall for mussaf, the remaining portion of the prayer service.

Kiddush clubs vary in offerings, although hard alcohol and wine are typical. More extravagant kiddush clubs may include various appetizers similar to a regular kiddush, such as pickles, whitefish spread, or pickled herring. Kiddush clubs may also sometimes raise money for the synagogue or other charities through membership fees or "bottle sponsorships".

Some kiddush clubs congregate in members' homes after services have concluded to avoid disrupting services. Additionally, some synagogues refer to regular kiddush or other social activities hosted by the synagogue as "kiddush clubs".

== History ==
There is evidence that practices similar to modern kiddush clubs have been present in Jewish communities for hundreds of years. A 16th-century text, Sefer Yefeh Nof includes a responsa from Rabbi Moshe Yitzhak M’zia opining that leaving the synagogue to drink whisky during the Torah service is permissible as long as the participants do not eat a full meal.

== Criticism ==
Kiddush clubs have been met with criticism, particularly in the United States. In December 2004, the Orthodox Union (OU) called for the elimination of such practices. OU Executive Vice President Rabbi Dr. Tzvi Hersh Weinreb criticized "Kiddush Clubs" for detracting from the honor of the synagogue, promoting gossip, reducing decorum, and enabling substance abuse. Some synagogues have tried banning the clubs, but this is often unsuccessful as club members are often influential congregants of the synagogue.
