= Psychedelic church =

Type of religious organization

A psychedelic church, also known as an entheogenic church, is a church or religious organization that incorporates the use of psychedelic drugs in its religious practices. They provide psychedelic drugs such as ayahuasca, psilocybin-containing mushrooms, and peyote to their members and operate either legally or illegally depending on the jurisdiction and licensing.

The first formal psychedelic churches started in the early 1900s, for instance the first peyote church in 1914 and the Native American Church (NAC) in 1920. Psychedelic churches are rapidly on the rise as of the 2020s in the United States and Canada.

== List of psychedelic churches ==
=== United States ===
- Cantelmoism (Chris Cantelmo) (Los Angeles, California) (2018–2019) – dimethyltryptamine (DMT)
- Céu do Beija-Flor (Massachusetts) (1988–1990) – ayahuasca
- Chapel of Sacred Mirrors (CoSM) (Wappingers Falls, New York) (founded in 1996 by Alex Grey and Allyson Grey) – various
- Church of Ambrosia (Zide Door, Church of Entheogenic Plants) (San Fran./Oakland, California) – psilocybin mushrooms, cannabis, others
- Church of Gaia (Spokane, Washington) – ayahuasca
- Church of the Celestial Heart (CCH) (Lebec, California) – ayahuasca
- Church of the Eagle and the Condor (CEC) (Phoenix, Arizona) – ayahuasca
- Church of the Holy Light of the Queen (CHLQ) (Ashland, Oregon) – ayahuasca
- Church of the Sacred Synthesis (formerly Church of Psilomethoxin) (Austin, Texas/nationwide) – psilomethoxin (claimed but disputed)
- Church of the Tree of Life (California) (1971–1990) – various
- Dog Commune (Los Angeles, California) (late 1960s) – LSD
- Flor da Mãe Divina (Flower of the Divine Mother; FDMD) (Redondo Beach, California) – ayahuasca
- League for Spiritual Discovery (LSD) (founded 1966 by Timothy Leary in New York) – LSD
- Ledgeway Sangha (Austin, Texas) – 2C-B, 6-APB
- Mycelian Church of San Francisco (San Francisco, California) – psilocybin-containing mushrooms
- Native American Church (NAC; Peyotism, Peyote Religion) (many locations) – peyote
- Native American Church of New York (NACNY) (New York City, New York) (1976–1979) – peyote
- Neo-American Church (Original Kleptonian Neo-American Church; OKNeoAC) (~1965–present) – various
- Oratory of Mystical Sacraments (OMS) (Shiprock, New Mexico/nationwide) – psilocybin-containing mushrooms
- Peyote Way Church of God (Aravaipa Valley, Arizona) (1977–present) – peyote
- Psychedelic Venus Church (PVC; PsyVen) (Berkeley, California) (1970–1973) – cannabis, others
- Sacred Garden Community (SGC) (Oakland, California) – various
- Soul Quest Ayahuasca Church (Orlando, Florida) – ayahuasca
- Temple of Eden (Los Angeles, California) – 5-MeO-DMT, others
- Temple of the True Inner Light (TTIL) (New York City, New York) (1980–present) – dipropyltryptamine (DPT), others
- Trans Human Church of Enlightenment (Toronto, Canada) – 2C-I
- União do Vegetal (UDV) (United States branches) – ayahuasca (See Gonzales v. O Centro Espírita Beneficente União do Vegetal)
- Many others

=== Brazil ===
- Santo Daime – ayahuasca
- União do Vegetal (UDV) – ayahuasca

=== Japan ===
- Aum Shinrikyo (Aleph) (doomsday cult) – LSD, mescaline, others

== See also ==
- Psychedelicism
- Psychedelic syndrome
- Psychedelic Cults and Outlaw Churches
