= Temple of the True Inner Light =

American psychedelic church

- Formation: 1980; 46 years ago
- Founders: Alan Birnbaum (born 1946 or 1947 (age 79–80))
- Type: Psychedelic church
- Location(s): Former: 335 E. 9th St., New York, New York, 10003; Current: 207 1/2 E. 5th St., New York, New York, 10003
- Members: Unknown (but five full or live-in members in 1989)
- Publication: Testimony to the Psychedelic (1981); Temple Literature (2010s)
- Website: ttil.org (old 1, old 2) youtube.com/@ttil4998
- Formerly called: The Church of the Psychedelic Eucharist (1975); The Native American Church of New York (1976–1979)

The Temple of the True Inner Light (TTIL), also once formerly known as the Native American Church of New York (NACNY), is a small psychedelic church or cult that was founded in 1980 and has operated for decades in the East Village of Manhattan in New York City, New York. It employs the legal psychedelic drug dipropyltryptamine (DPT; "The Light") as its eucharist and believes DPT and other psychedelics to be God in physical form. The group is not actually Native American in any way, but an earlier and much larger incarnation of the church called the Native American Church of New York operated between 1976 and 1979 and primarily used peyote. The temple is said to have been the most publicly visible psychedelic church in North America for many years. Its public location has long-since closed, but the church continues to exist in some capacity as of the mid-2020s.

== Beliefs and practices ==
The Temple of the True Inner Light followed a kind of psychedelic-based eclectic revisionist Christian religion. It appears to have mainly been based in Christianity, with the group extensively referencing the Bible, but incorporated elements from multiple world religions. The church believed that psychedelics are the physical form of God, referring to them as the literal "Flesh of God". In addition, they professed that all religions actually have their basis in the psychedelic experience. Their founder Alan Birnbaum has said that he first came to view "the Psychedelic" as a "Primeval Light Being" and as "God the Creator" after experiences with smoked diethyltryptamine (DET). Relatedly, the temple's long-standing slogan was "The Psychedelic is the Creator". They primarily employed the unscheduled and hence legal dipropyltryptamine (DPT; "The Light") as their sacrament, but also used and/or advocated other psychedelics including peyote, LSD, morning glory, dimethyltryptamine (DMT), DET, and psilocybin, as well as cannabis. DPT is capable of producing short yet powerful psychedelic experiences analogously to DMT. The church has been described as genuine and sincere in their beliefs.

The temple is said to have been focused on their founder and leader Birnbaum, whom they describe as the "Firstborn of the Psychedelic" and claim has been reborn throughout history as religious figures such as Moses, Zoraster, and Jesus Christ, among others. According to multiple sources, they believed Birnbaum to be Christ and a prophet and temple members to be reincarnations of Christ's disciples. The church is also said to have believed that those who rejected their teachings were committing "deadly sin" and were condemned to hell. As stated by the temple, whoever is not part of their church belongs to the "Antichrist" and to the "body" or "world of Satan". They have been referred to by many sources as a "cult". However, one source dissented, instead calling them a non-traditional religious group built around psychedelics.

The church operated out of a small storefront in the East Village or Lower East Side of Manhattan and offered free communion services with smoked DPT to the public following an initial interview session. It required that visitors stay for the duration of their psychedelic experience, about 1 to 2 hours, whilst listening to audiotapes that consisted of biblical recitations on a background of meditative music. More experienced church members also took DPT orally, which has a longer duration of 2 to 4 hours. According to the temple, "the Psychedelic", whom they view as God, instructed them to offer communion with DPT to the public. The group published a long booklet called Testimony to the Psychedelic (1981) and handed out the booklet and flyers in New York City counterculture hotspots to advertise their church and spread their word. Their storefront featured a large psychedelic mandala with their slogan "The Psychedelic is the Creator" and their booklet contains multiple detailed works of psychedelic art created by church members. Relatedly, the group is known to have frequented Psychedelic Solution, a famous psychedelic art gallery and storefront in the nearby Greenwich Village. The temple has mentioned synthesizing DPT, with simple psychedelic tryptamines like DMT, DET, and DPT having fairly easy syntheses.

Other principles of the Temple of the True Inner Light included adherence to vegetarian and nutritious diets, opposition to the use of other drugs including alcohol, opioids, and cocaine, and promotion of non-violence and honesty. In addition to their church services, they have also run a non-profit organization called Temple Charities sponsoring detox programs and building affordable housing for low-income and homeless people.

== History ==
The Temple of the True Inner Light was founded by Alan Birnbaum in the East Village of Manhattan in New York City in 1980. Many other psychedelic churches and storefront temples preceded the church on the historical Lower East Side starting in the 1960s with the availability of street LSD. This neighborhood is described as having once been a small "[psychedelic] city-state" and has been likened as the Haight-Ashbury district of the East Coast. Though the temple was founded in 1980, earlier versions of the group also started by Birnbaum existed under other names beginning in the mid-1970s, including the Church of the Psychedelic Eucharist (1975) and the Native American Church of New York (NACNY) (1976–1979). Birnbaum may have been a Yippie and the temple has been described as being "kind of like very radical hippies".

Despite the earlier name of the Native American Church of New York, the church was not actually Native American, was not affiliated with the Native American Church (NAC), and had few or no Native American members. The Native American Church of New York sued for the right to use peyote and other psychedelics for religious purposes in Native American Church of New York v. United States in 1979, but largely lost the case. An appeal led to the ruling being affirmed in 1980. The church was raided and Birnbaum arrested for having 20,000 peyote buttons (638 lbs worth) in 1979, with a possible sentence of 15 years to life in prison, but the case appears to have never gone to court. The Native American Church of New York claimed to have roughly 1,000 members in 1979. Around 1980, Birnbaum wrote to the Drug Enforcement Administration (DEA) inquiring about the legality of the unscheduled designer psychedelics 4-HO-DET, dipropyltryptamine (DPT), and methylethyltryptamine (MET). News about DPT's use in psychedelic-assisted therapy had begun to appear in the late 1970s. Birnbaum was informed by the DEA that the three psychedelics he had inquired about were indeed currently legal. As a result, the church renamed itself to the Temple of the True Inner Light and began employing DPT in 1980. Unlike many other psychedelics, DPT has never been made an explicitly controlled substance in the United States. However, it could be considered illegal under the Federal Analogue Act of 1986.

Journalist and actor Max Cantor came upon the Temple of the True Inner Light and was writing a story on them in the years before he died of a heroin overdose in 1991. Daniel Rakowitz, a local eccentric and later murderer and cannibal dubbed the "Butcher of Tompkins Square Park", is known to have briefly visited the temple in early 1989. The members of the church were disturbed by Rakowitz, who proclaimed himself to be the Antichrist and carried around a copy of Adolf Hitler's Mein Kampf and a live rooster, but nonetheless tried to counsel and help him, before finally telling him to stay away. Cantor incidentally encountered Rakowitz and interviewed him for his story about the temple in June 1989. Rakowitz told Cantor that he had smoked DPT at the church three times. At some point, Rakowitz also attempted to form his own sect or cult around cannabis called the Church of 966. In August 1989, Rakowitz murdered his roommate, a dancer named Monika Beerle, then ate parts of her, made her into a soup, and fed the soup to homeless people in Tompkins Square Park. The park was only about 0.2 miles (0.3 km) or a 4-minute walk from the temple. Rakowitz's case and trial were highly publicized, with him eventually being found not guilty by reason of insanity in 1991 and being indefinitely committed to a psychiatric institution. Although Rakowitz has said that he smoked DPT at the temple a few times prior to committing his crimes, he also had a long history of psychosis since childhood and heavily used cannabis and drugs in general.

The Temple of the True Inner Light has operated for decades and still exists in some capacity as of the mid-2020s. It has been described as having once been the most publicly visible psychedelic church in North America for many years. The church was apparently able to operate without legal problems or prosecution due to factors like their nature as a religious group, DPT being an obscure legal psychedelic, and New York City being preoccupied with more dangerous drugs and organizations. Authorities such as the DEA were well-aware of the group, but opted not to interfere with their operations. The temple's membership over time is unknown, though it is thought to have never gained many members and had only five full or live-in members in 1989. Its beliefs and practices are said to have repelled many potential or would-be members. One of the church's members defected in the 1980s and there has been a long-running online feud between the church and that member, whom they refer to as "Judas", since 1999. The temple's storefront in the East Village eventually closed, with its location being a boutique since 2001, and the church relocated to private dwellings. It continued to operate publicly until at least the early 1990s. Their website existed by 1996, temporarily went down in 2026 when their hosting provider Tripod shut down, and was then re-hosted that year.

News outlets such as the New York Daily News and United Press International (UPI) broke notable stories on the Temple of the True Inner Light in 1988. Peter Gorman, the eventual editor-in-chief of the New York City-based High Times magazine, once visited the temple and smoked DPT there, with his experience published in High Times in 1990. The psychedelic chemist Alexander Shulgin corresponded with the temple and wrote briefly yet kindly about them in his 1997 book TiHKAL (Tryptamines I Have Known and Loved). One of the experience reports for DPT in TiHKAL describes experiencing "The Light" and appears to be from the temple. The church has been covered in modern times by Mike Marinacci in his 2023 book Psychedelic Cults and Outlaw Churches and by others such as Hamilton Morris. Morris, the creator of the television show Hamilton's Pharmacopeia, spent much of 2018 researching and spending time with the group and has a long-running project on them that has yet to be published. The temple was referenced in a satirical segment by The Late Show With Stephen Colbert in 2022.

== Gallery ==
The church's storefront. Date around 1988.

One of the church's flyers. Date early 1990s.

Cover of the booklet Testimony to the Psychedelic (1981).

Psychedelic art by a former church member. Date early 1980s.
Note: More and higher-resolution images available in the off-site gallery in the External links.

== See also ==
- Psychedelic church
- List of new religious movements
- List of people claimed to be Jesus
- Psychedelic syndrome
