= Cannabis in Illinois =

Cannabis is legal in Illinois for both medical and recreational use. Illinois became the eleventh state in the US to legalize recreational marijuana effective January 1, 2020.

With the passage of the Illinois Cannabis Regulation and Tax Act in 2019, Illinois became the first state in the nation to legalize recreational sales by an act of the state legislature, as previous states had legalized sales by voter initiatives. Vermont legalized recreational use, but not sales, through its legislature (later legalizing sales after Illinois had already done so). At full maturity, Illinois is expected to generate between $2 and $4 billion in annual revenues from recreational sales. A first in the nation, Illinois will also expunge an estimated 700,000 marijuana-related police records and court convictions in a phased approach forecast to be completed by 2025. Retail sales from recreational cannabis in Illinois average an estimated $40 million in revenue each month since legalization and have allowed police to acquire an estimated $3 million from marijuana related civil asset forfeitures each year.

Since 2014, the Illinois Medical Cannabis Patient Program (MCPP) has also enrolled over 172,000 qualifying patients in the state's medical cannabis and opioid alternative programs across 110 dispensaries offering a lower tax rate when compared to recreational transactions.

In 2022, the 113 dispensaries across Illinois sold $1.5 billion worth of marijuana products.

== Prohibition (1931) ==
In 1931, Illinois prohibited recreational use of cannabis, as part of a nationwide trend across 29 states in the early 20th century.

== Cannabis Control Act (1978) ==
Illinois passed the Cannabis Control Act in 1978, which technically allows for medical marijuana. However, in order for it to become an actuality, action was required from two state departments: Human Services and the State Police. Neither department took action.

== Medical cannabis (2013) ==
The Illinois General Assembly passed the Compassionate Use of Medical Cannabis Pilot Program Act in 2013 (MCPP). The law legalizes the use of medical cannabis in tightly controlled circumstances. In August 2013, Governor Patrick Quinn signed into law the state's medical marijuana program, which would take effect on January 1 making it the 20th state to do so.

Once a medical caregiver has certified their qualifying medical condition, "legally registered patients" may apply for an ID card that allows the use of cannabis for medical purposes. The law lists over 30 specific medical conditions that may be legally treated using cannabis, and allows the Department of Public Health to add other conditions to the list via administrative rulemaking. Applications for patients, growers, and vendors began in September 2014.

As of October 2020, the Medical Cannabis Patient Program had significantly grown to over 143,000 qualifying patients participating in the state's medical cannabis and opioid alternative programs.

== Decriminalization (2016) ==
In July 2016, Illinois reduced punishment for under 10 grams of cannabis to a $100–200 fine; it was a misdemeanor previously. The law also sets the requirement for DWI at 5 nanograms/ml of THC in the blood.

== Proposed recreational use (2017) ==
On March 22, 2017, Illinois lawmakers proposed legalizing recreational marijuana in the state. The measure would also allow residents to possess up to 28 grams (1 oz) of cannabis and to grow five plants. Early estimates found that legalized marijuana would generate between $350 and $700 million in annual sales. The Chicago Tribune reported legislation was "widely expected to pass" in 2019, following election of pro-legalization governor J. B. Pritzker and a favorable state legislature.

== Medical cannabis expansion (2018–2019) ==
On August 28, 2018, Illinois's medical cannabis program greatly expanded becoming available as an opioid painkiller replacement. The legislation also eased the application process as applicants will no longer have to be fingerprinted or undergo criminal background checks. Some estimate the expansion could bring in up to 365,000 new patients into the medical marijuana program generating an additional $425 million in revenue for the state.

On August 12, 2019, Governor J. B. Pritzker signed into law legislation that once again expands Illinois's medical cannabis program and also makes it permanent. The new law adds an additional 11 conditions to the existing program including chronic pain, anorexia nervosa, autism, Irritable bowel syndrome, migraines, osteoarthritis, Ehlers–Danlos syndrome, Neuro-Behcet's autoimmune disease, neuropathy, polycystic kidney disease, and superior canal dehiscence syndrome. When recreational marijuana becomes legal in January 2020, taxation for medical cannabis products will remain at 1%.

== Recreational legalization (2019) ==
On May 31, 2019, the Illinois General Assembly passed the Illinois Cannabis Regulation and Tax Act to legalize recreational marijuana use starting on January 1, 2020. The bill was signed by Governor J. B. Pritzker on June 25, 2019. Recreational-use revenue in Illinois is expected to reach an estimated $1.6 billion a year. Illinois became the first state in the nation to legalize cannabis for recreational sale through a state legislature rather than ballot initiative. Overall, Illinois is the 11th state in the US to allow recreational marijuana.

An estimated 700,000 Illinoisans will qualify for the expungement of past marijuana-related convictions. The state, in partnership with the Illinois State Police, expects to fully complete the process by 2025. To date, Illinois was the first state in the nation to include the social equity centric provision.

On January 1, 2020, the first day of legal recreational sales, over 77,000 customers spent $3.2 million in legal sales at dispensaries across Illinois. These figures were historic as no other state, Oregon being second, has generated such significant first day recreational sales. Dispensaries saw long lines across the state with customers coming from across the Midwest and nation. On January 6, 2020, Governor Pritzker's office announced that in the first five full days of recreational adult-use sales, 271,169 individual transactions totaled over $10.8 million in sales statewide. Total sales for January 2020 approached $40 million, despite supply shortages.

In addition, more than 700 applications were submitted for the second round of newly awarded dispensary licenses, scheduled to be announced on May 1, 2020; over 600 were considered "social equity" applicants which meet certain criteria to benefit historically disenfranchised communities.

On December 31, 2020, Governor Pritzker announced that his administration granted pardons for 9,210 low-level cannabis convictions and the wiping of 492,000 non-felony cannabis-related arrest records.

== Cultivation ==
Under the Illinois Cannabis Regulation and Tax Act, which took effect on January 1, 2020, stipulated that medical marijuana patients could grow up to five plants at a time in their home or on their property. However, recreational users cannot grow marijuana in their home nor on their premises at all. A violation of this stipulation is a civil penalty of 200 dollars. In regards to cultivating cannabis commercially, only Illinois's existing licensed medical marijuana facilities were able to grow the crop initially. However, in 2020 "craft growers" will be able to apply for licenses to cultivate cannabis for commercial use for no larger than 5,000 square feet (460 m^{2}) of crop.

== Law waiving and suspending transport license fees ==
In December 2023, the Governor signed into law a bill that waivers and suspends transport licence fees—until January 1, 2027—for the cannabis industry, including corporations and business associates.
