= Psychedelicism =

Social movement inspired by psychedelic drugs

Psychedelicism, also known as psychedelic ideology or psychedelic spirituality, is a diverse ideology and social movement inspired by use of psychedelic drugs such as LSD, psilocybin, and mescaline as well as sometimes cannabis. It prominently manifests in the form of psychedelicist culture, overlapping with the "counterculture" of the 1960s and thereafter.

The foundation of psychedelicism is the united belief that psychedelics expand consciousness and thereby elevate people to a higher level of spiritual awareness or knowledge. Relatedly, psychedelicism often espouses that psychedelics are not merely drugs but are "sacraments". Other approaches such as meditation, yoga, and prayer are said to also expand consciousness, but psychedelics are said to do so far more expediently. Psychedelicism is described as a heterogeneous mixture of theories and practices and is described as not wholly religious nor scientific. It has taken the form of psychedelic groups including religions and churches, activist groups, secret or esoteric brotherhoods, experimental or alternative therapy centers, and anarchist conspiracies, among many others. The concept of psychedelicism emphasizes how psychedelic groups or sects belong to a collective movement whilst also forming their own distinct practices, doctrines, rituals, and values.

Some "psychedelicists" have rejected words like "religion" or "church" as they felt that such concepts are antiquated and that the psychedelic experience is too sacrosanct to be put into words. Others have espoused a psychedelic theology of sacred humor and laughter, for instance the Merry Pranksters and the Discordian Society. Yet others have engaged in psychedelicist activism as well as psychedelic militancy, also known as "Flower Power", such as the Youth International Party (Yippies!) and various eco-radical groups that were inspired and motivated by use of psychedelics.

A modern scientific and secularist interpretation of psychedelics is that consciousness is constructed by the brain and that psychedelics distort this construction and thereby help to reveal how the brain and consciousness work, in turn fostering positive psychological change. This is based on scientific theories of consciousness and psychedelics, including work by researchers such as Anil Seth, Robin Carhart-Harris, and Karl J. Friston among others. In relation to the preceding, figures such as Sam Harris and Roland Griffiths have espoused secular spirituality and have advocated the careful employment of psychedelics as a gateway and aid to meditation and in turn a way of enhancing personal well-being. Psychedelics are also being studied and used for medical applications such as treatment of psychiatric disorders like depression.

Psychedelicism emerged in the 1950s and early 1960s, with Aldous Huxley's book The Doors of Perception (1954) and subsequently with the counterculture of the 1960s. Timothy Leary has been described as the "Martin Luther" of psychedelicism and his slogan "turn on, tune in, drop out" as the commandment of the movement. The scholar J. Christian Greer formally coined and defined the term psychedelicism by 2019 and expanded on it in the 2020s. He found existing terminology such as "counterculture" and "hippie" to be unsatisfactory, with for instance the former term being a product of the War on Drugs, intended to ostracize psychedelic spirituality, and obfuscating or de-emphasizing the use of psychedelics. Greer describes "psychedelicism" as a value-neutral and psychedelic-centered alternative framework and replacement for the term "counterculture". The related term "psychedelic movement", prominent in the 1960s, became dramatically overshadowed by the term "counterculture" starting in the late 1960s. Psychedelicism previously peaked in the mid-1970s, but there has been a resurgence with the psychedelic renaissance of the 2020s.

== See also ==
- Counterculture of the 1960s
- Hippie
- Psychedelia
- Psychedelic church
- Psychedelic Cults and Outlaw Churches
- Psychedelic era
- Psychedelic syndrome
