= Changing Channels (Supernatural) =

- Supernatural episode
- Episode no.: Season 5 Episode 8
- Directed by: Charles Beeson
- Written by: Jeremy Carver
- Cinematography by: Serge Ladouceur
- Editing by: Anthony Pinker
- Production code: 318208
- Original air date: November 5, 2009
- Running time: 42 minutes

Guest appearances
- Richard Speight Jr. as The Trickster / Gabriel; Misha Collins as Castiel; Steve Bacic as Dr. Sexy; Hiro Kanagawa as Game Show Host

Episode chronology
← Previous "The Curious Case of Dean Winchester"	Next → "The Real Ghostbusters"
- Supernatural season 5

"Changing Channels" is the eighth episode of the fifth season of the paranormal drama television series Supernatural, and the 90th episode overall. The episode was written by Jeremy Carver and directed by Charles Beeson. It was first broadcast on November 5, 2009, on The CW. In the episode, Sam and Dean are trapped in a series of television show parodies by the Trickster, who attempts to force them into accepting their roles as vessels for the Apocalypse.

== Plot ==
Sam and Dean investigate a murder in Wellington, Ohio, that appears to be the work of the Trickster. While searching a warehouse, they are pulled into an alternate reality where they must live through various television shows. The Trickster informs them that if they can survive "24 hours in TV Land," he will let them go.

The brothers are forced to participate in several parodies:

- A 1980s-style sitcom featuring a laugh track and a specialized title sequence.
- Dr. Sexy, M.D., a medical drama parody where Dean is forced to perform surgery.
- Nutcracker, a Japanese game show where Sam is physically punished for failing to answer questions in Japanese.
- A procedural cop show in the style of CSI: Miami.
- A commercial for genital herpes medication starring Sam.

Castiel attempts to intervene but is repeatedly banished or "muted" by the Trickster. Eventually, the Winchesters realize the Trickster is more powerful than they previously thought. They manage to trap him in a circle of burning holy oil. During the confrontation, Dean realizes the Trickster is not a pagan deity but an angel.

The Trickster reveals his true identity as the Archangel Gabriel. He explains that he fled Heaven and took on the persona of a Trickster because he could no longer stand the constant bickering between his brothers, Michael and Lucifer. He tells the Winchesters that they are destined to be the vessels for the two archangels because their relationship mirrors that of Michael and Lucifer. Dean refuses to play his part and eventually releases Gabriel from the holy fire, though he calls the archangel a "coward" for running away from his family responsibilities.

== Reception ==
=== Viewers ===
The episode was watched by 2.7 million viewers. According to The Futon Critic, the episode contributed to a strong night for The CW, following The Vampire Diaries which ranked first in its time period among women aged 18–34.

=== Critical reviews ===
Professional ratings
Review scores
Source	Rating
IGN	9.3
The A.V. Club	A−

"Changing Channels" received critical acclaim and is frequently cited as one of the best episodes of the series. Diana Steenbergen of IGN gave the episode a 9.3 out of 10, praising the comedic elements and the significant plot advancement, noting that "the Trickster's true identity is a great twist that makes perfect sense in the context of the season's arc."

The A.V. Club's Steven Hyden gave the episode an "A−" and enjoyed the "meta" nature of the episode, stating, "it’s a testament to how well-defined Sam and Dean are that the show can put them in these ridiculous situations and still have the emotional stakes feel real by the end."
