= Ambry =

Recessed cabinet in the wall of a Christian church

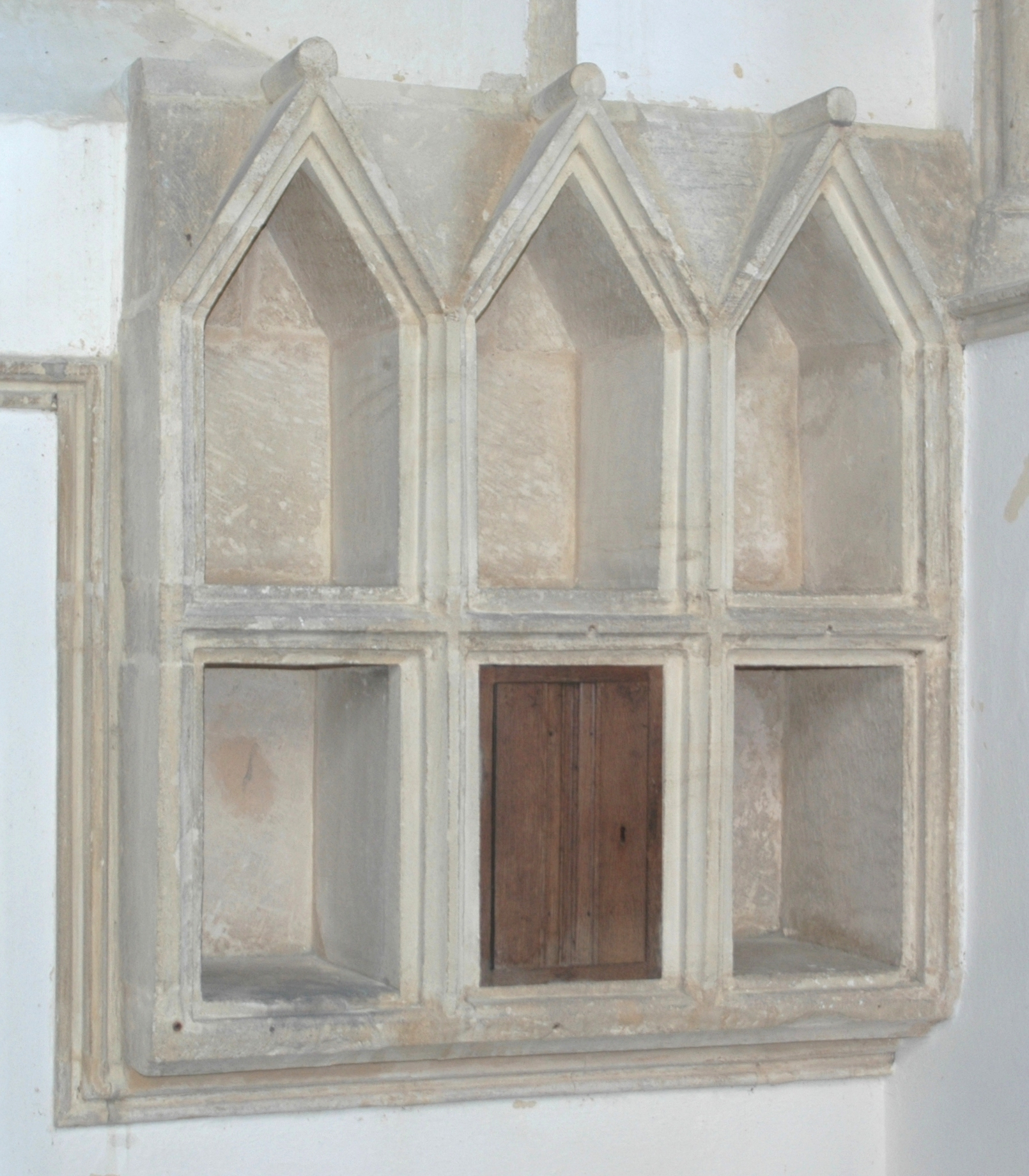
Mid-13th century aumbry at St Matthew's Church, Langford, Oxfordshire, England

An ambry (or almery, aumbry; from the medieval form almarium, cf. Lat. armārium, "a place for keeping tools"; cf. O. Fr. aumoire and mod. armoire) is a recessed cabinet in the wall of a Christian church for storing sacred vessels and vestments. They are sometimes near the piscina, but more often on the opposite side. The word also seems in the Middle Ages for any closed cupboard or even a bookcase.

Items kept in an ambry include chalices and other vessels, as well as items for the reserved sacrament, the consecrated elements from the Eucharist. This latter use was infrequent in pre-Reformation churches, although it was known in Scotland, Sweden, Germany and Italy. More usually the sacrament was reserved in a pyx, usually hanging in front of and above the altar or later in a "sacrament house".

After the Reformation and Council of Trent, the Catholic Church did not reserve the sacrament in ambries, which were used to house the Oil of the Infirm used in the Anointing of the Sick. Current Catholic canon law permits only a tabernacle or hanging pyx for housing consecrated hosts, and forbids reservation in an ambry.

The Reformed churches abandoned reservation of the elements, so ambries became redundant except for storing vessels. The Scottish Episcopal Church since the 18th century, along with other Anglican churches since the 19th century (following the Tractarian revival), have made reservation again common. In the Church of England, the sacrament is reserved in all of its forty-four cathedrals, as well as many parish churches, although it is very uncommon amongst churches of the evangelical tradition. Reservation of the sacrament is quite common in the Episcopal Church of the United States, the Anglican Church of Australia, the Anglican Church in Aotearoa, New Zealand and Polynesia, the Anglican Church of Southern Africa, as well as in the Anglican Church of Canada (though with varying degrees of veneration, depending on the parish). Even some traditionally Low Church parishes, such as St. Anne's, Toronto, reserve the sacrament.

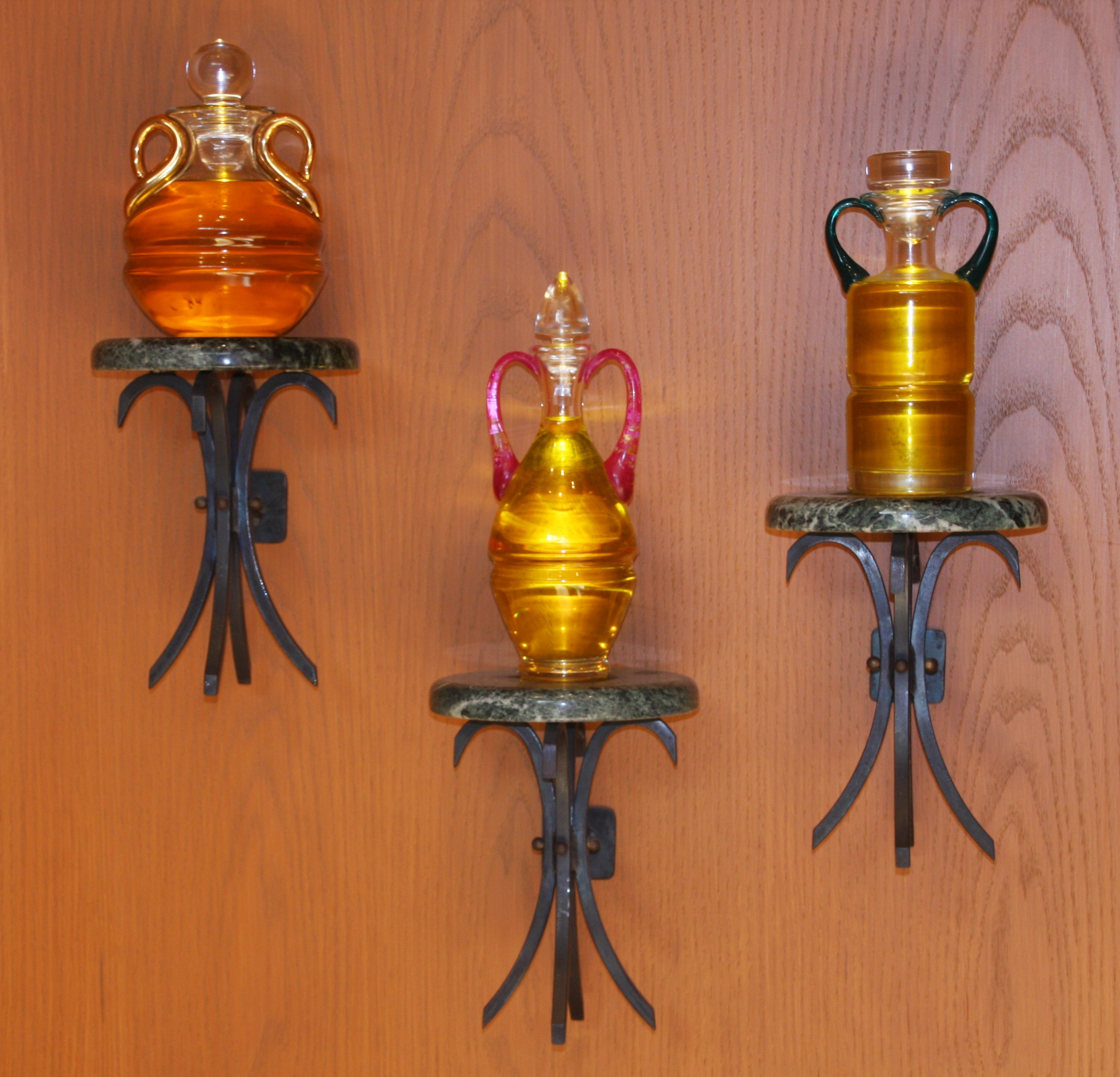
Catholic ambry containing vessels of the three holy oils: Chrism, Oil of catechumens, and the Oil of the Sick

== Roman Catholic usage ==
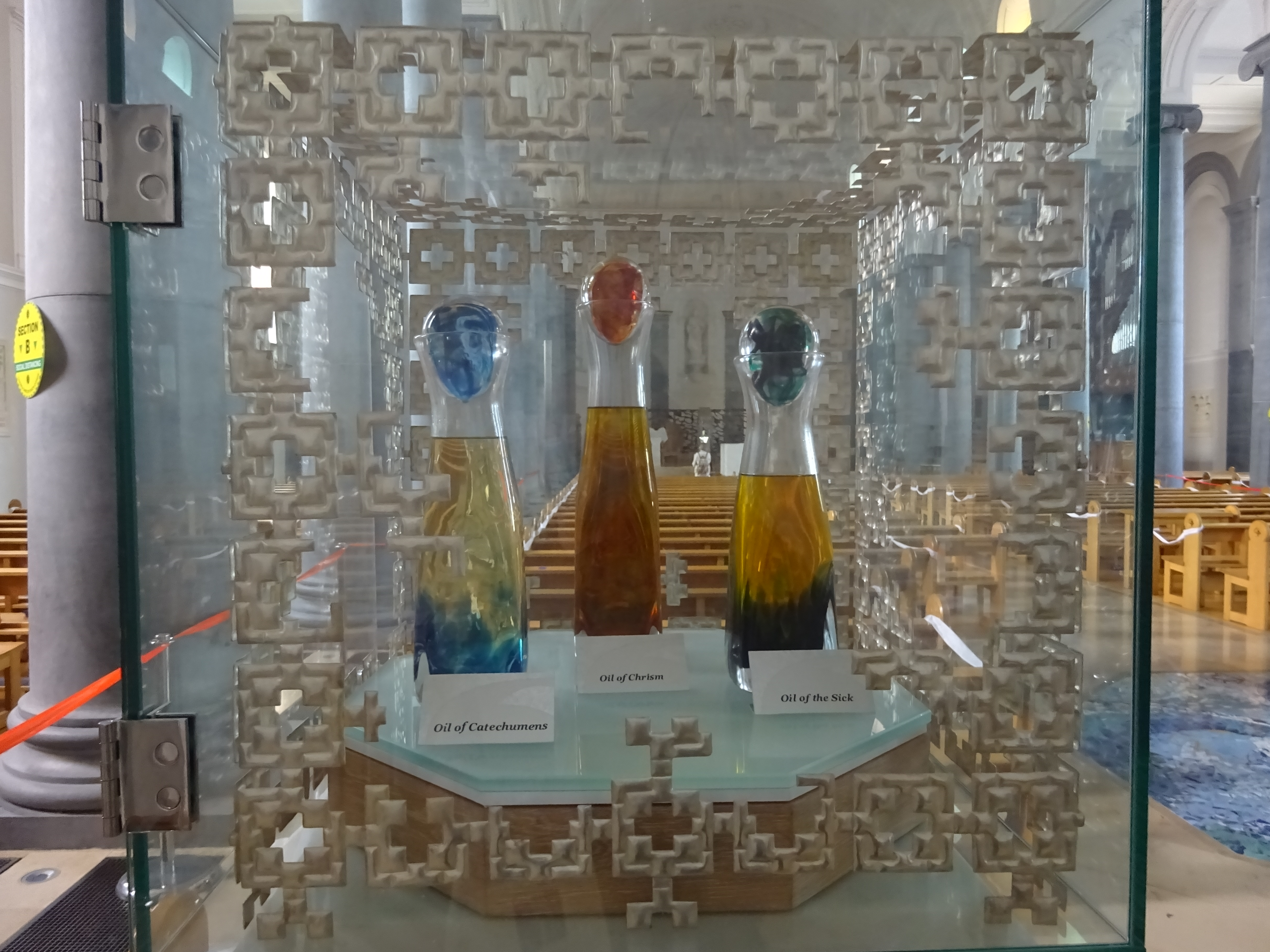
Ambry in St Mel's Cathedral, Ireland, with (left to right) the oil of catechumens, sacred chrism and oil of the sick

In Roman Catholic usage, an ambry is traditionally in the sanctuary (the altar area) of a church or in the Baptistery, and is used to store oils used in sacraments: Oil of catechumens (indicated by the Latin letters O.C.), Oil of the Sick (O.I.), and Sacred Chrism (S.C.). Former regulations required the ambry to be secured and locked, and lined and veiled with either purple cloth (in reference to the Oil of the Sick) or white (for the Sacred Chrism). The door was usually marked "O.S." or Olea Sancta, to indicate the contents. Such regulations are now relaxed, so while many churches continue to use such an ambry, the oils are stored and even displayed in other ways.

== Anglican usage ==
According to Ritual Notes, the Anglo-Catholic manual of rites and ceremonies, aumbries are used for reservation rather than tabernacles in churches in some dioceses because the diocesan bishop has so ordered. These aumbries should conform in general to the requirements for tabernacles including a sanctuary lamp and covering with a veil. For storage of the holy oil of the sick, a lesser aumbry is to be used; as with older Catholic usage, it should be lined with purple silk, covered with a purple veil and kept locked; the door should be inscribed "oleum sacrum". If the priest lives far away from the church, he or she may be authorised to instead keep the oil of the sick at home.

== See also ==
- Glossary of the Catholic Church
- Index of Catholic Church articles

== Sources ==
- King, Archdale A. (1965). Eucharistic Reservation in the Western Church. New York: Sheed & Ward. LCCN 65020722.
- Halsbury's Laws of England. Vol. Ecclesiastical Law (fourth ed.).
