= Holy oil =

Holy oils are used in religion and magic, and include:

- Holy anointing oil, to anoint priests and articles of the Jewish Tabernacle
- In Christianity (see Holy oils in the Catholic Church):
  - Chrism
  - Oil of catechumens
  - Holy oil from pilgrimage sites, see Monza ampullae
  - Oil of the sick, used in the anointing of the sick
- Holy Oil of Aspiration, a ceremonial magic oil
