= Perfumer (Myrepsos) =

Honorary title

Perfumer (Greek: Μυρεψός, romanized: myrepsos) was an honorary title given in the Byzantine Empire to medical doctors.

The honorary title is held to this day, bestowed by the Ecumenical Patriarchate of Constantinople, where every ten years perfumers prepare the chrism.
