= Hadzilia Folklore and Ethnological Museum =

Museum in Serres, Greece

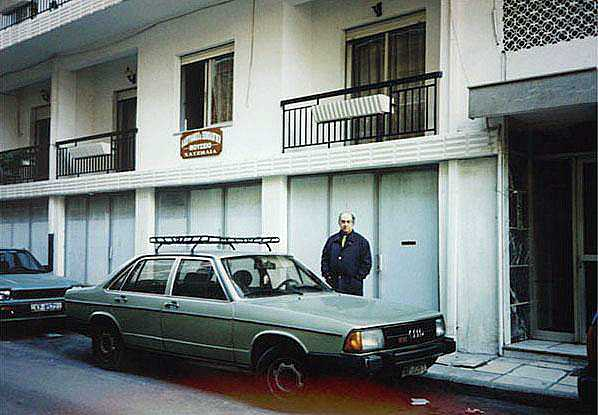
- Outside view
- Established: June 1998
- Location: Serres, Greece
- Coordinates: 41°05′34″N 23°33′05″E

The Hadzilia Folklore and Ethnological Museum is a private museum in the northern Greek city of Serres, a collection built up over twenty years, which opened in June 1998.

== History ==
Housed on the ground floor of a building in Serres town centre, its purpose is to give the local people and visitors to the town an opportunity to learn something about folk culture.

The museum has six sections: musical instruments, jewellery, weapons and uniforms, sacred vessels, traditional dress, and reconstructions of folk life.

The first section has a large number of old string, wind, and percussion instruments. The oldest, two Thracian lyres, date to the seventeenth century. Other noteworthy exhibits are a bellows organ, bagpipes, old gramophones, and a reconstruction of an ancient lyre. The most notable feature of section two is the 200 buckles of all types – priests buckles large and small, Sarakatsani buckles, Thracian buckles, and buckles from Orini. There are also collars, earrings, necklaces, watches, bracelets, crowns, and crosses, all dating to the nineteenth and twentieth centuries. The weapons in section three date from the late Neolithic to the present day and include slingstones, stone arrowheads, and metal arrowheads and spearheads. The more modern weapons include muzzle-loaded rifles, flintlocks, nineteenth-century revolvers, sabres from 1821, powder magazines, and percussion caps. There are also military uniforms of various nations, caps, bayonets, medals, and cartridge belts. Of particular interest is a swordstick made by a craftsman from Melnik.

In the ecclesiastical section are suspended 120 handmade silver oil-lamps from churches in Macedonia, numerous censers, a number of Gospels in Greek and in Russian dating to the seventeenth century, silver and gilt chalices, candlesticks, wood-carved and metal crosses, tabernacles, nuptial and baptismal crowns, gold-embroidered vestments (stoles, chasubles), epitaphii. The most important of all the exhibits is a chrismatory of St Demetrios, one of only four in the world. A little further on, recesses contain costumes and bedding used by the Sarakatsani, the Thracians, and the refugees from Asia Minor. Lastly, visitors may admire the traditional women's costumes of Florina, Orini in Serres prefecture, Arachova, Metaxades in Thrace, the Darnakochoria, and Nea Zichni, and mens costumes from Xiropotamos and Thrace.

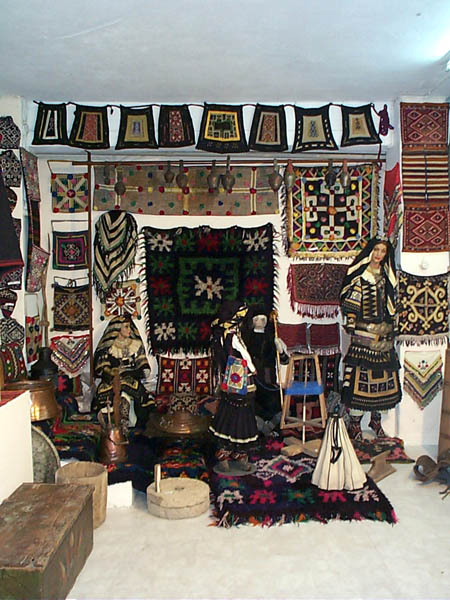
Costumes and bedding

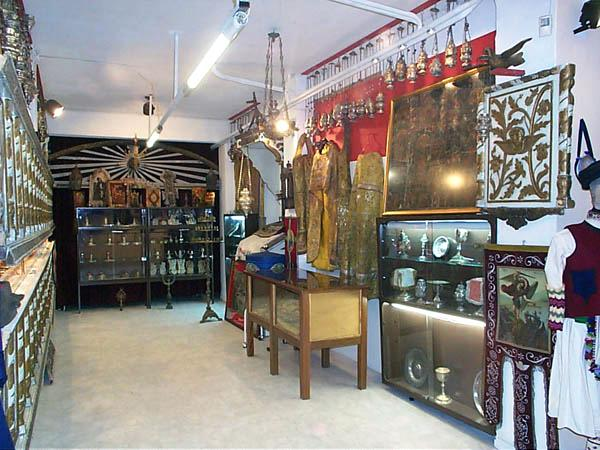
Ecclesiastical section

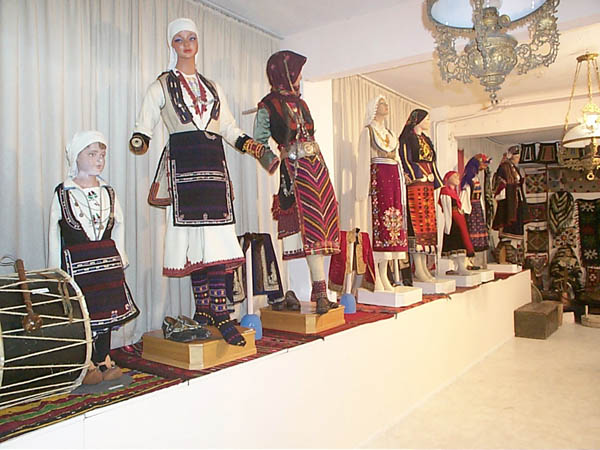
Traditional costumes

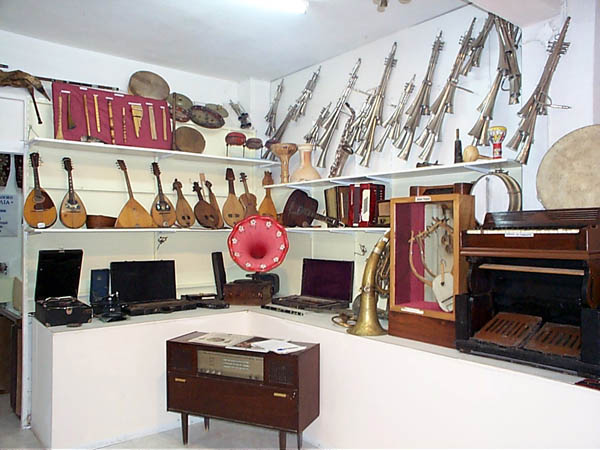
Traditional instruments

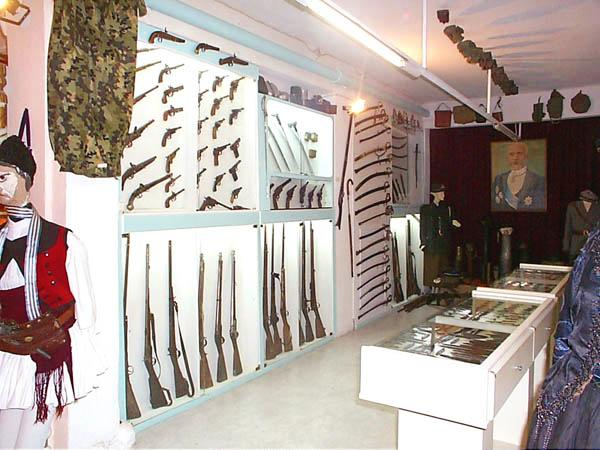
War section

== Sources ==
- This article incorporates text from the corresponding article at the Museums of Macedonia website, commissioned by the Macedonian Heritage foundation, written by Vlasis Vlasidis, and published under a CC-BY-SA-3.0 license.
