= Chrismarium =

Container for holy oils

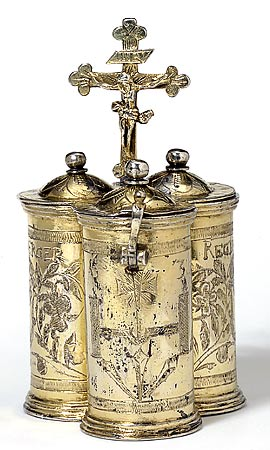
Chrismatory for ritual oil from Germany, 1636 (silver-gilt, Victoria and Albert Museum, London)

A chrismarium, chrismal, or chrismatory is a container for holy oils, considered a sacramental in the Catholic Church.

The chrismarium comprises three individual vessels, which may be shaped like jars, ampullae, or cylindrical boxes. The first vessel, usually marked I. or INF., contains oil for the anointing of the sick; the second, usually marked CAT., contains the oil of catechumens; the third, usually marked CHR., contains chrism. Each vessel has a sheath or case to hold it, and the three cases are often joined together into a single object. The vessels are usually made of gold or silver, but are sometimes made of other materials such as tin or pewter.

Each parish church ordinarily has its own chrismarium, which it refills as needed from the large chrismarium kept in the cathedral. The bishop consecrates the yearly supply of oils on Maundy Thursday, and these are kept in the cathedral chrismarium.

== See also ==
- Christening (disambiguation)
- Chrismation
- Holy oil (disambiguation)
