= Presbyterium =

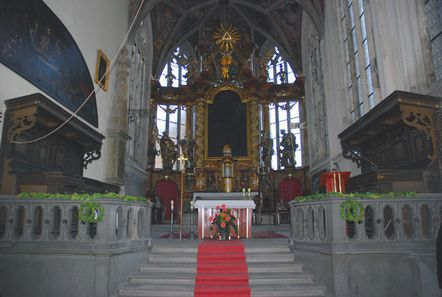
Presbyterium in Mělník, Czech Republic.

Presbyterium is a modern term used in the Catholic Church and Eastern Catholic Churches after the Second Vatican Council in reference to a college of priests, in active ministry, of an individual particular church such as a diocese or eparchy. The body, in union with their bishop as a collective, is a symbol of the collaborative and collegial nature of their sacerdotal ministry as inspired by the reforms made during the Second Vatican Council.

The presbyterium is most visible during the ordination of new priests and bishops and the Mass of the Chrism: the Holy Thursday Mass where the blessing of the oils used in the sacraments of Baptism, Confirmation, Anointing of the Sick, and Holy Orders takes place. They are also visible during other special liturgical functions such as the wake and burial of their bishop.

Liturgically, within Catholicism and Evangelical-Lutheranism, the presbyterium is the area of the church in which the clergy functions. It is more commonly called the chancel (or sanctuary).

== Etymology ==
The word presbyterium is the Latinised form of the Greek πρεσβυτέριον (presbuterion), 'council of elders, presbytery', from Greek πρεσβύτερος (presbuteros), the comparative form of πρέσβυς (presbus), 'elder'.

== Presbyterate ==
The presbyterate is another term used to refer to the sacerdotal collegiality of priests with their bishop, commonly used in the Anglican Communion. Within churches which hold apostolic succession, it is reflected in the concelebration of the Eucharist, in joining the bishop in the laying on of hands on an ordinand to the priesthood, in collegial processions, at inductions, funerals, and other liturgical activities. In the Catholic Church it is used to refer to the second order of priesthood - one is said to be "ordained to the presbyterate". Paragraph 1536 of the Catechism of the Catholic Church states that there are three distinct orders of apostolic ministry in the sacrament of Holy Orders: episcopate, presbyterate and diaconate

== See also ==
- Presbyter
- Priesthood in the Catholic Church
