= Presbyter =

Christian cleric

Presbyter (/ˈprɛzbɪtər/) is an honorific title for Christian clergy. The word derives from the Greek presbyteros, which means elder or senior, although many in Christian antiquity understood presbyteros to refer to the bishop functioning as overseer. The word presbyter is used many times in the New Testament, referring both to the Jewish leadership and the "tradition of the elders", and to the leaders of the early Christian community.

In modern Catholic, Orthodox and Anglican usage, presbyter is distinct from bishop: in the Catholic Church it means Catholic priest. In other Protestant usage, for example, Methodism, presbyter does not refer to a member of a distinctive priesthood called priests but rather to a minister, pastor, or elder.

== Etymology ==
The word presbyter etymologically derives from Greek πρεσβύτερος presbyteros, the comparative form of πρέσβυς presbys, 'old man'. However, while the English word priest has presbyter as the etymological origin, the distinctive Greek word ἱερεύς hiereus 'priest' is never used for presbyteros or episkopos in the New Testament, except as being part of the general priesthood of all believers, with the first Christians making a distinction between pagan and Jewish priests and New Testament presbyters.

== History ==
The earliest organization of the Church in Jerusalem was according to most scholars similar to that of Jewish synagogues, but it had a council or college of ordained presbyters (Greek: πρεσβύτεροι elders). In Acts 11:30 and Acts 15:22, we see a collegiate system of government in Jerusalem though headed by James, according to tradition the first bishop of the city. In Acts 14:23, the Apostle Paul ordains presbyters in the churches he founded.

The term presbyter was often not yet clearly distinguished from overseer (ἐπίσκοποι episkopoi, later exclusively used as meaning bishop), as in Acts 20:17, Titus 1:5–7 and 1 Peter 5:1. The earliest writings of the Apostolic Fathers, the Didache and the First Epistle of Clement for example, show the church used two terms for local church offices—presbyters (seen by many as interchangeable with episcopos or overseer) and deacon.

In Timothy and Titus in the New Testament a more clearly defined episcopate can be seen. It says that Paul had left Timothy in Ephesus and Titus in Crete to oversee the local church (1Tim 1:3 and Titus 1:5). Paul commands them to ordain presbyters/bishops and to exercise general oversight, telling Titus to "rebuke with all authority" (Titus 2:15).

Early sources are not clear, but various groups of Christian communities would have had a group or college of presbyter-overseers functioning as leaders of the local churches. Occasionally women were described as presbyter on their tomb inscriptions or in other texts. Eventually, the head or "monarchic" bishop came to rule more clearly, and all local churches would eventually follow the example of the other churches and structure themselves after the model of the others with the one bishop more clearly in charge, though the role of the body of priests remained important.

From the second century, it is certain that the offices of bishop and presbyter were clearly distinguished, after the death of the Apostles, there was a differentiation in the usage of the synonymous terms, giving rise to the appearance of two distinct offices, Bishop and presbyter. The bishop was understood mainly as the president of the council of presbyters, and so the bishop came to be distinguished both in honor and in prerogative from the presbyters, who were seen as deriving their authority by means of delegation from the bishop. The distinction between presbyter and bishop is made fairly soon after the Apostolic period. Each Episcopal see had its own bishop and his presence was necessary to consecrate any gathering of the church.

Eventually, as Christendom grew, individual congregations were no longer directly served by a bishop. The bishop in a large city (the Metropolitan bishop) would appoint a priest to pastor the flock in each congregation, acting as his delegate.

The fourth century scholar Jerome (347–420) stated:

Therefore a presbyter is the same as a bishop is, and before that by the instigation of the devil emulations in respect to religion arose, and people began to say: I am of Paul, and I of Apollos, and I of Cephas, the churches were governed by the common counsel of the presbyters. But, after that each one was accustomed to regard those whom he had baptized as his own disciples and not of Christ, it was decreed in the whole world that one chosen from among the presbyters should be placed over the others ... Therefore, as presbyters may know that by the custom of the church they are subject to the one who has been placed over them; so also bishops may understand that they are greater than presbyters more by custom than by the veritable ordinance of the Lord.

Slightly different other versions (quoting John Calvin) express the same.

A Catholic explanation suggests that the delegates were bishops in the actual sense of the term but that they neither possessed fixed sees nor had a special title. Since they were essentially itinerant, they confided the fixed necessary functions relating to the daily life of the community to the care of some of the better-educated and highly respected converts.

Along with this was the title "priest" being distinctively ascribed to presbyters/bishops. Writer Greg Dues, author of Catholic Customs & Traditions, claims that

Priesthood as we know it in the Catholic church was unheard of during the first generation of Christianity, because at that time priesthood was still associated with animal sacrifices in both the Jewish and pagan religions. ... When the Eucharist came to be regarded as a sacrifice [after Rome's theology], the role of the bishop took on a priestly dimension. By the third century bishops were considered priests. Presbyters or elders sometimes substituted for the bishop at the Eucharist. By the end of the third century people all over were using the title 'priest' (hierus in Greek and sacerdos in Latin) for whoever presided at the Eucharist.

With the legalization of Christianity and the threat of paganism dwindling from the passage of time, the use of the word priest was adopted from presbyter; as they felt there was no longer a chance of their faith being confused with the ideas, philosophies and culture of the Roman religion.

== Modern usage ==
The Catholic Church, the Orthodox Church, the non-Chalcedonian churches, and similar groups typically refer to presbyters in English as priests (priest is etymologically derived from the Greek presbyteros via the Latin presbyter). Collectively, however, their "college" is referred to as the "presbyterium", "presbytery", or "presbyterate".

This usage is seen by most Protestant Christians as stripping the laity of its priestly status, while those who use the term defend its usage by saying that, while they do believe in the priesthood (Greek ἱερεύς hiereus – a different word altogether, used in Rev 1:6, 1 Pet 2:9) of all believers, they do not believe in the eldership of all believers. This is generally true of United Methodists, who ordain elders as clergy (pastors) while affirming the priesthood of all believers. The Methodist Church of Great Britain has formally referred to its presbyters as such (rather than the common title of 'minister') since 1990, from when it was possible to be ordained as a Methodist deacon, which is also an order of Methodist ministry. The evangelical (or ultra low-church) Anglican Diocese of Sydney has abolished the use of the word "priest" for those ordained as such. They are now referred to as "presbyters". Presbyterians sometimes refer to their ruling elders and teaching elders (ministers) as presbyters.

The website of the International Standard Version of the Bible, a Protestant translation, responds to a criticism of its use of "elder" over "priest" by stating the following:

No Greek lexicons or other scholarly sources suggest that "presbyteros" means "priest" instead of "elder". The Greek word is equivalent to the Hebrew zaqen, which means "elder", and not priest. You can see the zaqenim described in Exodus 18:21–22 using some of the same equivalent Hebrew terms as Paul uses in the GK of 1&2 Timothy and Titus. Note that the zaqenim are not priests (i.e., from the tribe of Levi) but are rather men of distinctive maturity that qualifies them for ministerial roles among the people.

Therefore, the NT equivalent of the zaqenim cannot be the Levitical priests. The Greek presbyteros (literally, the comparative of the Greek word for "old" and therefore translated as "one who is older") thus describes the character qualities of the episkopos. The term "elder" would therefore appear to describe the character, while the term "overseer" (for that is the literal rendering of episkopos) connotes the job description.

== See also ==
- John the Presbyter
- Prester John
- Presbyterium

== General and cited sources ==
- Liddell & Scott, An Intermediate Greek-English Lexicon, pp. 301, 668
- The Compact Edition of the Oxford English Dictionary, p. 2297
- The Oxford Dictionary of the Christian Church (3rd ed.), p. 1322
