= Chrism =

Consecrated oil used in various Christian churches

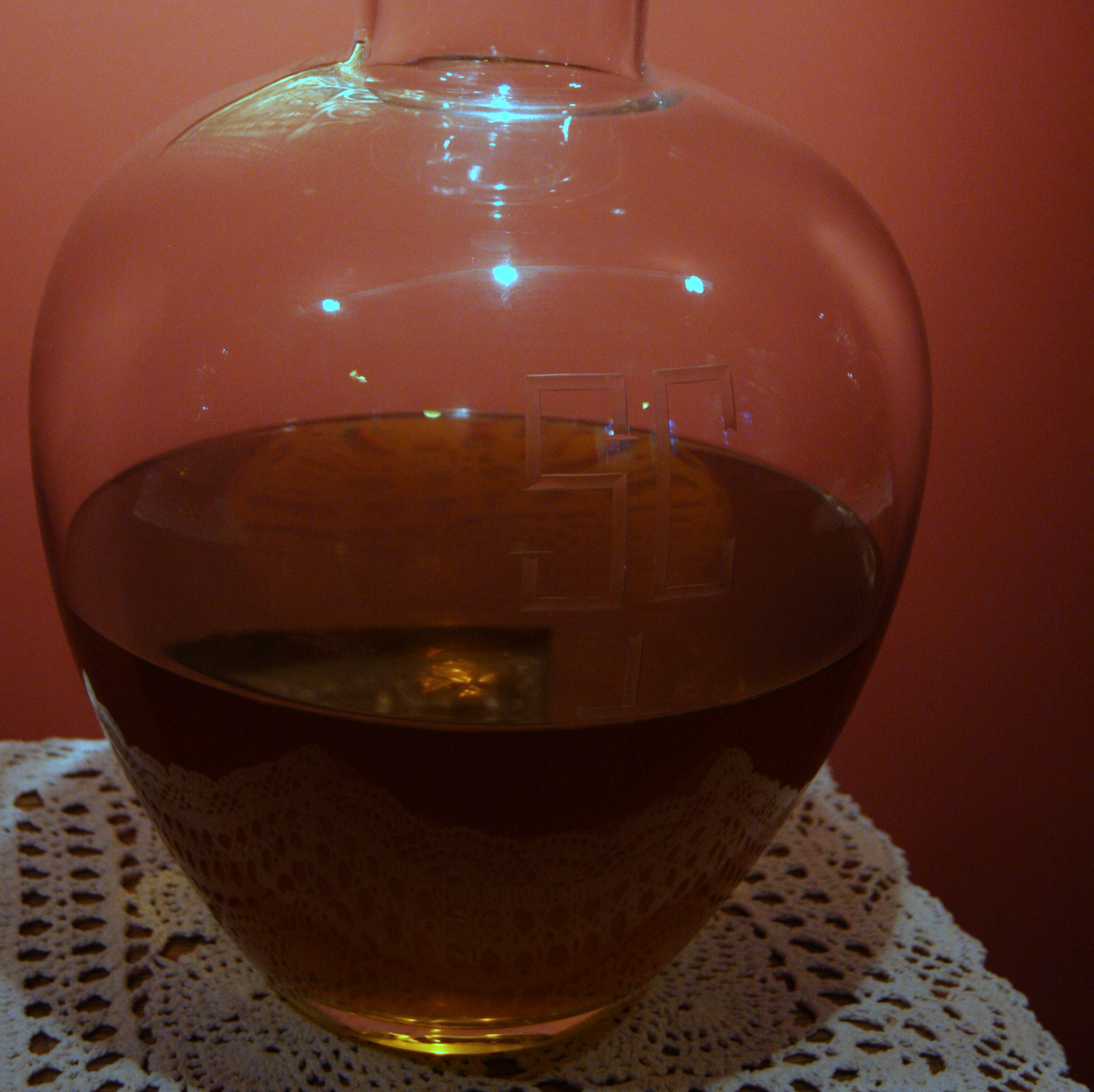
Glass vessel etched with the letters SC for sanctum chrisma containing chrism for the Catholic Church

Chrism, also called myrrh, myron, holy anointing oil, and consecrated oil, is a consecrated oil used in the Catholic, Eastern Orthodox, Oriental Orthodox, Assyrian, Nordic Lutheran, Anglican, and Old Catholic churches in the administration of certain sacraments and ecclesiastical functions.

== Name ==
The English chrism derives from Koine Greek via Latin and Old French. In Greek, khrîsma (χρῖσμα) was originally the verbal noun ("(the act of) anointing", "unction") of χρίειν ("anoint"). By extension, along with khrîma (χρῖμα), khrîstai (χρῖσται), and later khrísma (χρίσμα), it came to be used for the anointing oil or ointment itself. Khrísma came into Latin as chrisma, which appears in the works of Tertullian. This was adopted directly into Old English as crisma, which developed into Middle English crisme and various related spellings. In Old French, the original Latin was conflated with cramum ("cream"), developing into cresme, which was also borrowed into Middle English around 1300 as creme and various related spellings. The spelling chrism after the Latin original was generally adopted in the 16th century, after which "cream" came to be restricted to its present meaning.

The Proto-Indo-European root from which the Greek term derived has been reconstructed as *gʰrey- ("to trickle"). This is cognate with Sanskrit ghṛtə (घृत, from the radix घृ (भासे / क्षरणे / छादने), which means to shine / to trickle / to cover) and Hindi ghī (घी, "ghee"), as well as Lithuanian gr(i)ejù, griẽti ("skimming"), Middle Low German grēme ("grime"), Old English grīma ("mask, helm, spectre", presumably from an original sense of "covering" or "concealment"), English grime, and possibly Phrygian gegreimenan ("painted, ornamented, inscribed").

Chrism is also called myron or myrrh. Myron is an oil that is blessed by a bishop.

== Early Christian usage ==
Multiple early Christian documents discuss the "ordinance" or "several ceremonies...explained in the Apostolical Constitutions" of "chrism", including documents by Theophilus (d. 181) and Tertullian (d. 220).

The most detailed version of the practice is by Cyril of Jerusalem who details how ointment or oil was "symbolically applied to the forehead, and the other organs of sense" and that the "ears, nostrils, and breast were each to be anointed." Cyril states that the "ointment is the seal of the covenants" of baptism and God's promises to the Christian who is anointed. Cyril taught that being "anointed with the Holy anointing oil of God" was the sign of a Christian, and a physical representation of having the Gift of the Holy Spirit, and it retains this meaning in Catholicism and Orthodoxy today. He says, "Having been counted worthy of this Holy Chrism, you are called Christians, verifying the name also by your new birth. For before you were deemed worthy of this grace, you properly had no right to this title but were advancing on your way towards being Christians." (On the Mysteries 3.5)

== Western Christianity ==
=== Catholicism ===
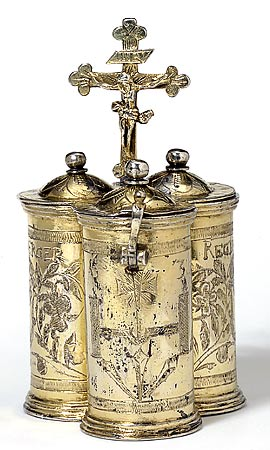
Chrismatory for ritual oil from Germany, 1636 (silver-gilt, Victoria and Albert Museum, London)

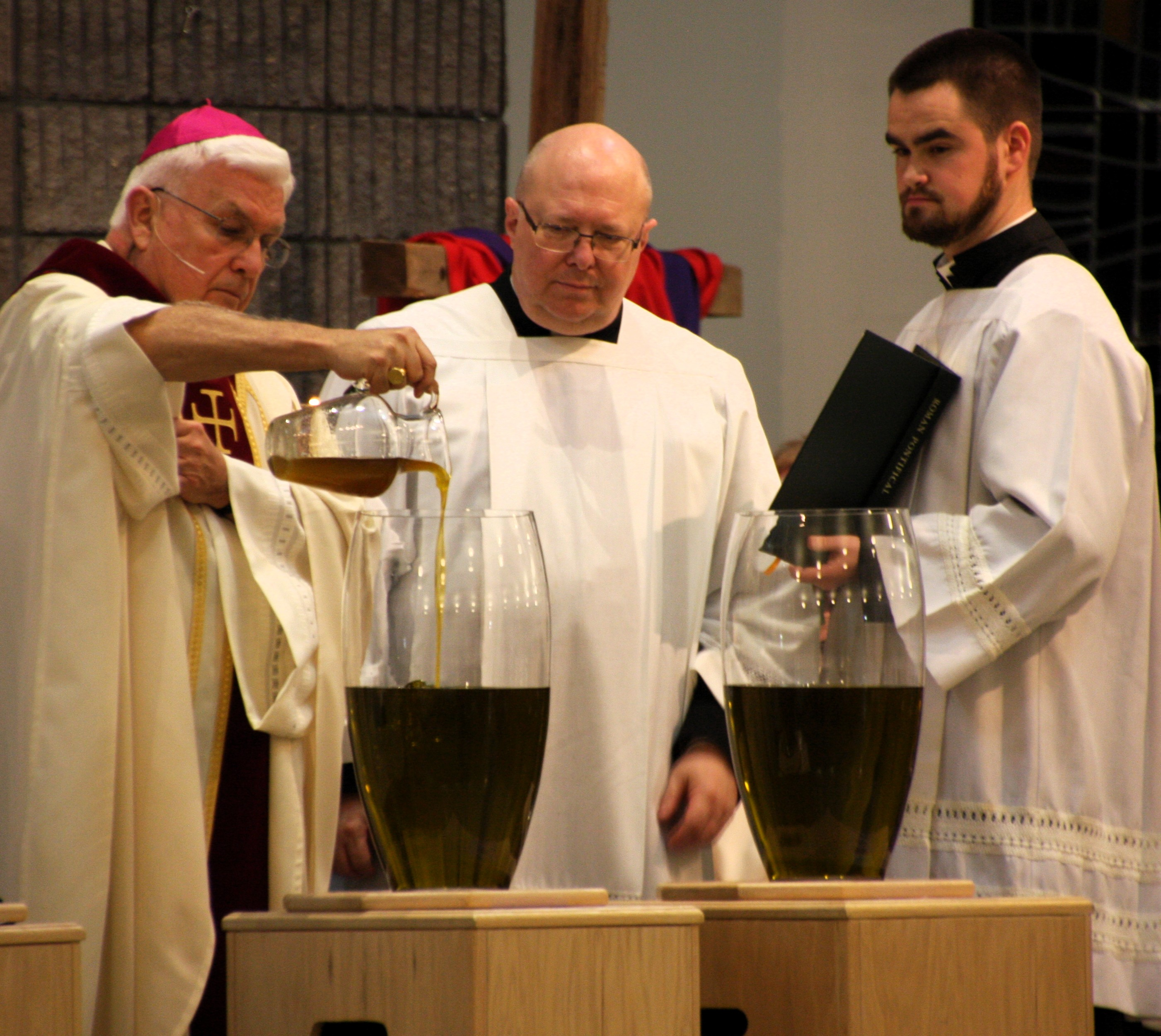
A bishop pouring balsam into oil at Chrism Mass

Chrism is essential for the Catholic sacrament of confirmation or chrismation and is prominently used in the sacraments of baptism and holy orders. Those to be confirmed or chrismated, after receiving the laying on of hands, are anointed on the head by the bishop or priest. In baptism, if the person baptized is not to be immediately confirmed or chrismated, the minister anoints them with chrism. Newly ordained priests are anointed with chrism on the palms of their hands, and newly ordained bishops receive an anointing of chrism on their foreheads. It is also used in the consecration of objects such as churches and altars.

In the liturgy prior to the reforms that followed the Second Vatican Council, which is still employed by certain ecclesiastical communities, the use of chrism during the administration of holy orders differs: in the older form of the Roman Rite, priests are anointed in the hands only with the oil of catechumens, while bishops consecrated with the old ritual are anointed both in the head and in the hands with chrism.

Before the reforms of the Second Vatican Council, chrism had to be used to consecrate patens and chalices as well. The sign of the cross would be made with the chrism on the interior parts of the chalice and paten where the Eucharist would rest; the cross would then be smeared to cover the entire interior parts. The chalice and paten would need to be consecrated with the chrism again if they were re-gilded. This ritual could only be performed by a bishop or a priest with the faculties to do so. According to the new rubrics, a simple blessing suffices. However, it is still permitted that the bishop performs the consecration with chrism.

Chrism is made of olive oil and is scented with a sweet perfume, usually balsam. Under normal circumstances, chrism is consecrated by the bishop of the particular church in the presence of the presbyterium at the Chrism Mass, which takes place in Holy Week, usually on the morning of Holy Thursday. The oil of catechumens and the oil of the sick are also blessed at this Mass.

These holy oils are usually stored in special vessels known as chrismaria and kept in a cabinet known as an ambry. When the oils are distributed to a priest for him to use in his ministry they are kept in a smaller vessel with three compartments, known as an "oil stock". There is also a type of oil stock that is shaped like a ring, to make the anointing easier. The "jewel" of the ring is a container with a removable lid.

Holy oils were also used, in the older form of the Roman Rite, for the anointing of kings during ceremonies of coronation. Several local rites allowed for the use of chrism in those coronation rites (e.g. in the pre-reformation English coronation rite the anointing was with chrism; Napoleon was anointed with chrism by Pope Pius VII, etc.). However, the general coronation rite of the Roman Liturgy, codified in the Pontificate of Pope Clement VIII, prescribed the use of the oil of catechumens for the anointing of kings.

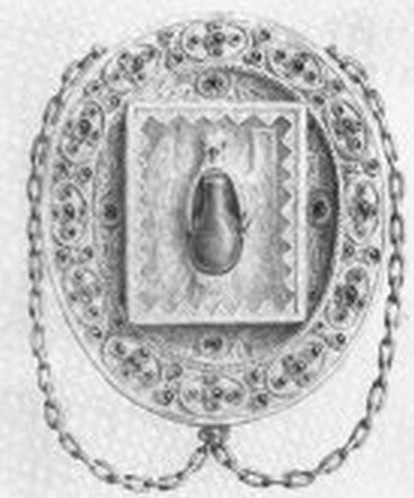
The original Holy Ampulla in its relic receptacle before 1793

The Holy Ampulla or Holy Ampoule (Sainte Ampoule in French) was a glass vial which, from its first recorded use by Pope Innocent II for the anointing of Louis VII in 1131 to the Coronation of Louis XVI in 1775, held anointing oil for the coronations of the kings of France. In each French coronation, one drop of this anointing oil was mixed with chrism. Thus, French coronations employed chrism mixed with the oil of the Sainte Ampoule for the anointing of kings. The Sainte Ampoule was said to have been discovered by Hincmar the Archbishop of Reims when the sepulcher containing the body of Saint Remi was opened in the reign of Charles the Bald and identified with the baptism of Clovis I, the first Frankish king converted to Christianity; it was kept thereafter in the Abbey of Saint-Remi, Reims and brought with formality to the Cathedral of Notre-Dame, Reims at each coronation, where the emphasis was on the anointment rather than on the crowning. Some remains of the content of the ampoule, destroyed in 1793 by French revolutionaries, were placed in a new reliquary made in time for the Coronation of Charles X and are kept since 1906 at the Archbishopric of Reims.

=== Evangelical-Lutheranism and Anglicanism ===
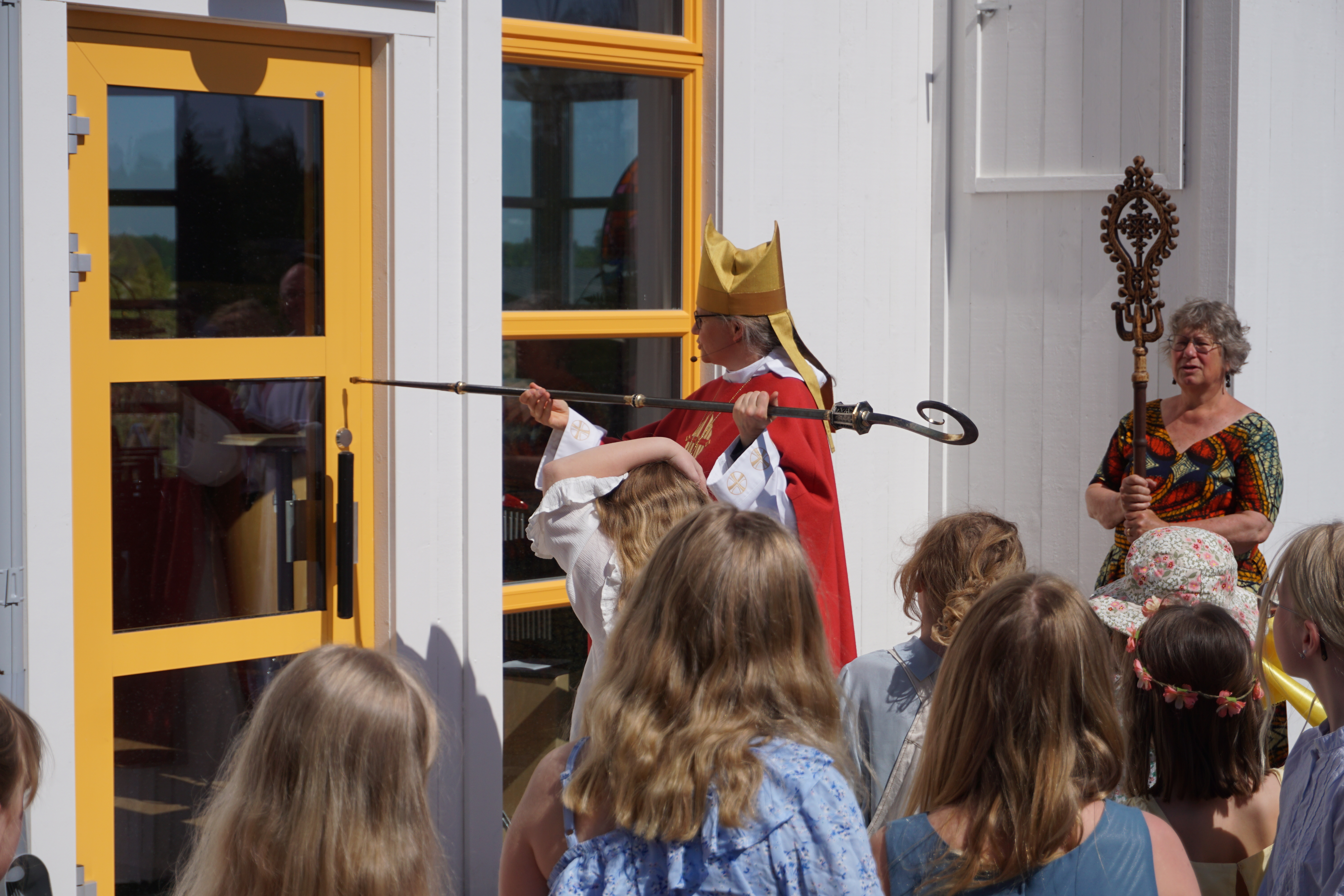
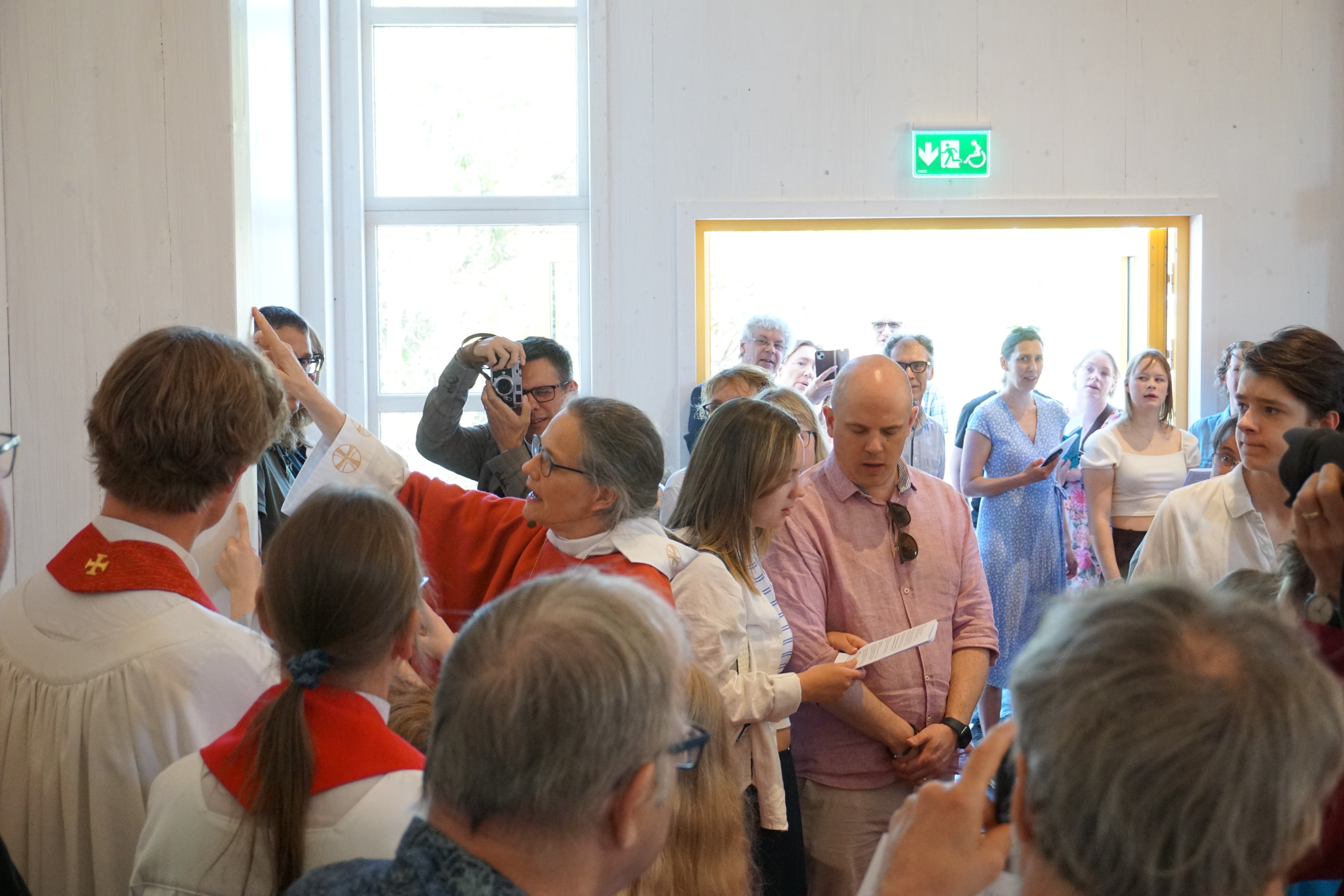
The dedication of Storvreta Evangelical-Lutheran Church by Bishop Karin Johannesson, the Bishop of Uppsala of the Church of Sweden, on Pentecost Day 2024; in Evangelical-Lutheran practice, the bishop knocks three times on the door of the church that is being dedicated with his/her crozier while praying Psalm 23 (left photograph). The bishop anoints the four walls of the church with Holy Chrism in the dedication of churches (right photograph).

The primary use of chrism in the Evangelical-Lutheran Churches and in the Anglican Churches is for the rite of chrismation, which may be included as a part of baptism, even for infants.

The oil of chrism is also commonly used in confirmation, although this practice is not followed by Anglican churches that are in the evangelical tradition. Owing to this difference of practice, it is common for Anglican confirmation liturgies to refer to the use of chrism as an option. The liturgy of the Church of England states "Oil mixed with fragrant spices (traditionally called chrism), expressing the blessings of the messianic era and the richness of the Holy Spirit, may be used to accompany the confirmation". The confirmation liturgy of the Anglican Province of Southern Africa includes the rubric "The Bishop may sign them on the forehead, using at his discretion the Chrism". The liturgy of the Igreja Lusitana (Anglican Church in Portugal) states at the point of confirmation: "Os confirmandos ajoelham perante o Bispo. Este pode assinala-los na testa com o sinal da cruz, usando oleo proprio" ("The confirmands kneel before the Bishop. He may anoint them on the forehead with the sign of the cross, using the proper oil").

The use of chrism in Anglican and Lutheran ordination liturgies is similarly presented as an option in most provinces. In the liturgy for the ordination of priests in the Church of England, for example, the instruction is: "The bishop may anoint the palms of the hands of each newly ordained priest, saying 'May God, who anointed the Christ with the Holy Spirit at his baptism, anoint and empower you to reconcile and bless his people'." There is a similar instruction for the ordination of bishops, who are anointed on the head rather than the palms of the hands.

An important and specific use of chrism is in the anointing during the coronation of the British monarch. In this part of the service, the Archbishop of Canterbury anoints the sovereign on the head, hands and heart. Anglicans consider this to be the holiest rite of the service, so much so that it is hidden from the congregation's view by a canopy of state. It was not filmed during the coronation of Queen Elizabeth II in 1953, or photographed in 1937 during the coronation of King George VI and Queen Elizabeth. During the coronation of Charles III in May 2023, specially-made, portable screens were used during the anointing to conceal the King and Archbishop from the congregation and TV cameras during this sacred rite. It is followed by the presentation of the crown jewels to the sovereign, then the actual coronation.

Its other notable use is in the consecration of church buildings, where it may be used to anoint the walls, the altar/table, and the place for reservation of the eucharistic sacrament for the sick.

As in other traditions, chrism is usually based on olive oil (although other plant oils can be used if olive oil is unavailable), scented with a sweet perfume, usually balsam. Civet oil, and ambergris from the intestines of whales may be used. In preparing the oil for the 2023 coronation of Charles III, monarch of the United Kingdom and several Commonwealth countries, animal-derived components were not used, the olive oil being scented with essential oils of sesame, rose, jasmine, cinnamon, neroli and benzoin, and with orange blossom.

Chrism is usually consecrated by the bishop of the particular church in the presence of the presbyterium at the Chrism Eucharist, which takes place on Maundy Thursday or a day shortly before, where priestly ordination vows are often renewed also. The oil of catechumens and the oil of the sick are usually also consecrated at this liturgy. Practices vary for the blessing of the chrism, from interpolations within the Eucharistic Prayer, to specific prayers of consecration, used at the discretion of the minister. Some Lutheran and Anglican liturgical books, however, make provision for a pastor who is not a bishop (a presbyter) to consecrate chrism in time of need and in the absence of the bishop. The oil for the coronation of Charles III was consecrated by the Patriarch of Jerusalem and the Anglican Archbishop in Jerusalem, at the Church of the Holy Sepulchre in Jerusalem.

=== Latter Day Saints ===
Members of the Latter Day Saint movement also practice ritual anointing of the sick, as well as other forms of anointing. Members of the Church of Jesus Christ of Latter-day Saints consider anointing to be an ordinance.

Members of the LDS church who hold the Melchizedek priesthood may use consecrated oil in performing the ordinance of blessing of the "sick or afflicted", although the blessing may be performed without oil if it is unavailable. The priesthood holder anoints the recipient's head with a drop of oil, then lays their hands upon the head and declares the act of anointing. Then another priesthood holder joins in, if available, and pronounces a "sealing" of the anointing, and other words of blessing. Melchizedek priesthood holders are also authorized to consecrate any pure olive oil, and often carry a personal supply in case they have need to perform a blessing. Oil is not used in other blessings, such as for people seeking comfort or counsel. The word "chrism" is not used.

In addition to the James 5:14–15 reference, the Doctrine and Covenants contains numerous references to the anointing and healing of the sick by those with authority to do so.

== Eastern Christianity ==
=== Eastern Orthodox Church ===
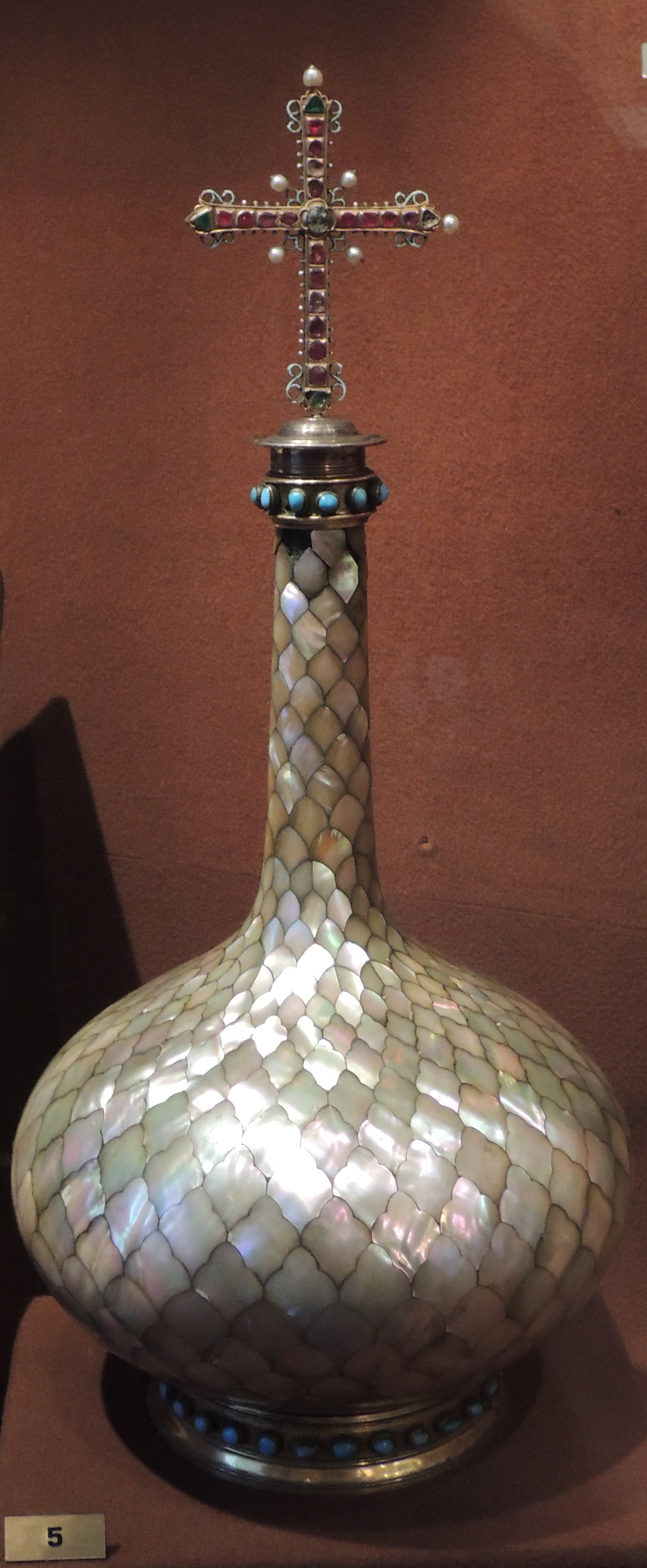
Chrismarium used in Russia. The vessel is named "Alabaster" in reference to Matthew 26:7.

Within the Orthodox Church chrism plays a part in many liturgical services and sacraments. The first sacrament that uses chrism, the sacrament of chrismation, is the second of the three sacraments of initiation (baptism, chrismation, and Divine Eucharist). For the Orthodox, chrismation canonically must be administered in conjunction with baptism, except in a case of true necessity. Here the blessing of the bishop upon the chrism functions as a substitute for the direct imposition of hands. Another use is in the consecration of church buildings, involving the anointing of the walls and of the altar table. Formerly, emperors and kings of monarchies where Orthodoxy was the state religion would receive anointment with chrism at their coronation. The introduction of anointing in the Byzantine coronation ceremony was a relatively late development; this was adopted only after the Latin occupation of Constantinople, following Latin practice.

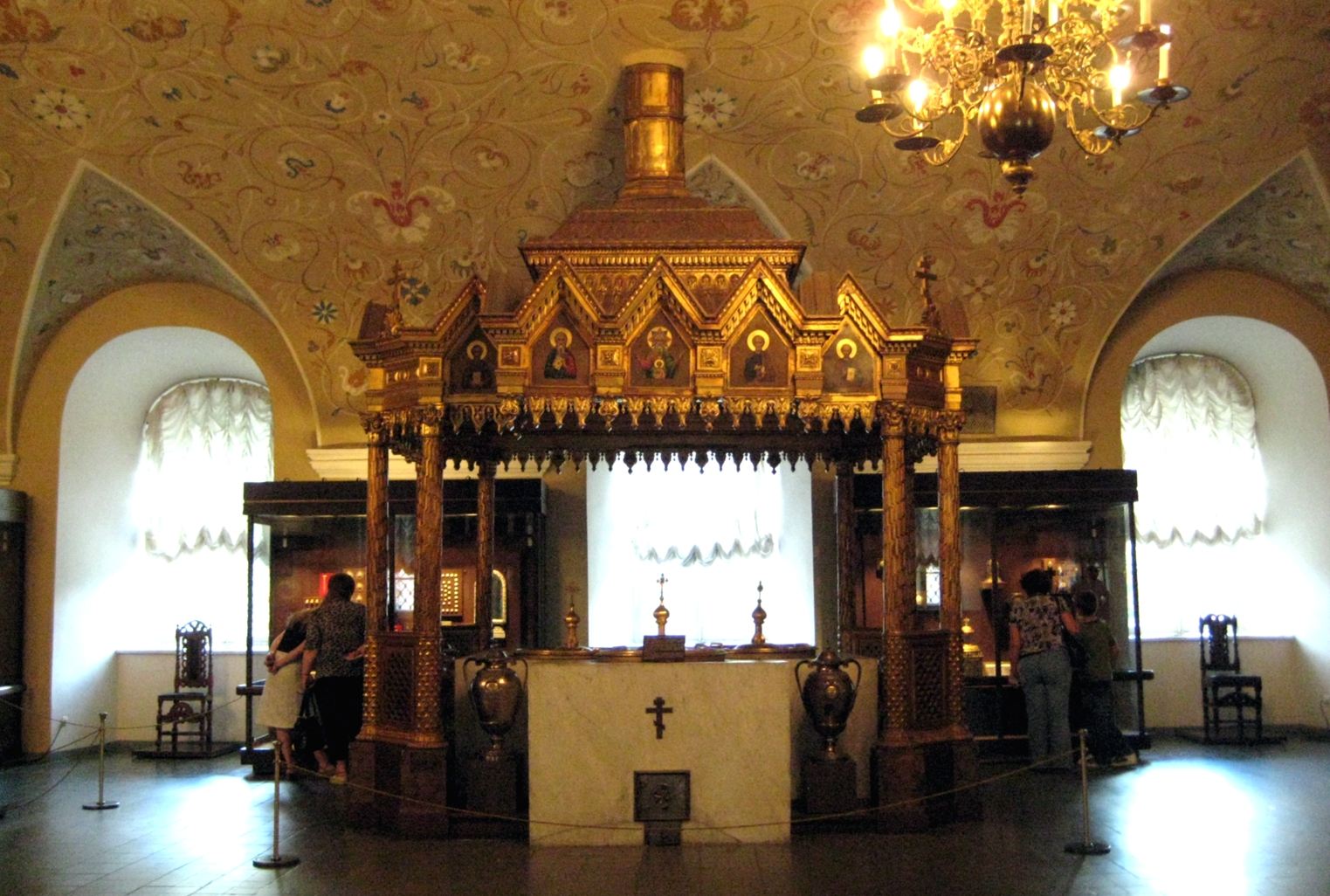
Stove and vessels for preparation of chrism, 18th century (former Patriarchal residence, Moscow Kremlin)

The Orthodox Church makes chrism during Holy Week beginning on Holy Monday and culminating in the Divine Liturgy on Holy Thursday when it is carried in the Great Entrance and placed upon the altar. It consists primarily of olive oil with the addition of a range of aromatic essences, patterned after the anointing oil described in Exodus 30:22–33. Holy Myron is confected only by a bishop, without prejudice to particular law which reserves this power to the patriarch. In Russian tradition:

[...] into each vessel of new myrrh are poured a few drops of the old myrrh [...] This is done in token of the uninterrupted connection of the Russian Church with the Greek, from which she received [...] the first consecrated myrrh.

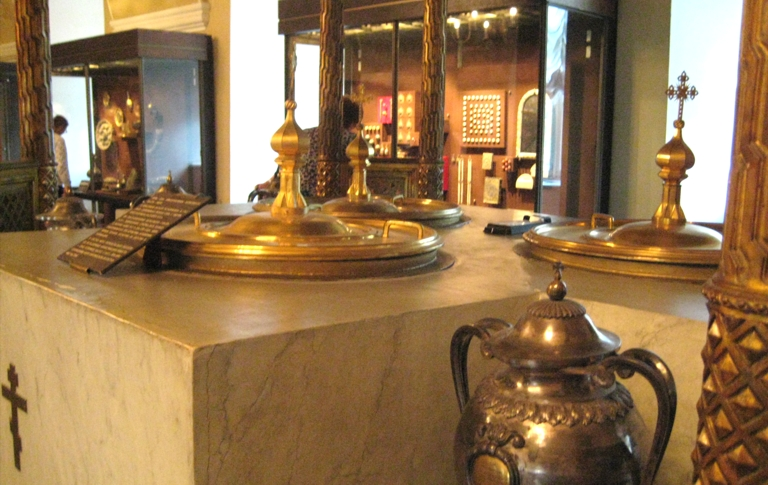
Stove for preparation of chrism, Moscow Kremlin, detail

On completion, chrism is distributed to all the bishops, who, in turn, give it to their parishes when needed. It is not made on a yearly basis, but only when supplies run short.

The Orthodox Patriarchate of Constantinople produces chrism roughly once every 10 years using an ancient formula of the Jewish prophets and patriarchs that calls for 64 ingredients, while the flame needed to boil the mixture during the preparation is made by burning old and disfigured icons. The preparation of the chrism in the patriarchate is carried out by the college of the Kosmētores Myrepsoí (Greek: Κοσμήτορες Μυρεψοί, "Deans Perfumers"), presided by the Árchōn Myrepsós, the "Lord Perfumer". The incumbent Archon Myrepsos is biochemist Prodromos Thanasoglou.

In Byzantine times the official responsible was the Grand Sacristan of the Patriarchate, but since then the specific office of the Archon Myrepsos was created. Laity are not allowed to handle either the chrism or the vessels containing it, therefore the Myrepsoi undergo a sort of "temporary ordination" into the clergy and are given by the patriarch a gold "Cross of Ministry" to hang from their necks for the duration of their four-day service. The Archon is given the lention, a silk "towel" or apron. Three copper cauldrons are used for the preparation: the largest contains olive oil, the smallest contains water and the aromatic ingredients and the middle contains wine, which allows the oil to boil without catching fire. The preparation involves several steps, some—such as the addition of musk and rose oil—performed by the patriarch himself. Once the chrism is filtered and ready, it is consecrated for the final time and stored in silver vessels in the Chapel of Saint Andrew, pending distribution.

=== Oriental Orthodox Churches ===
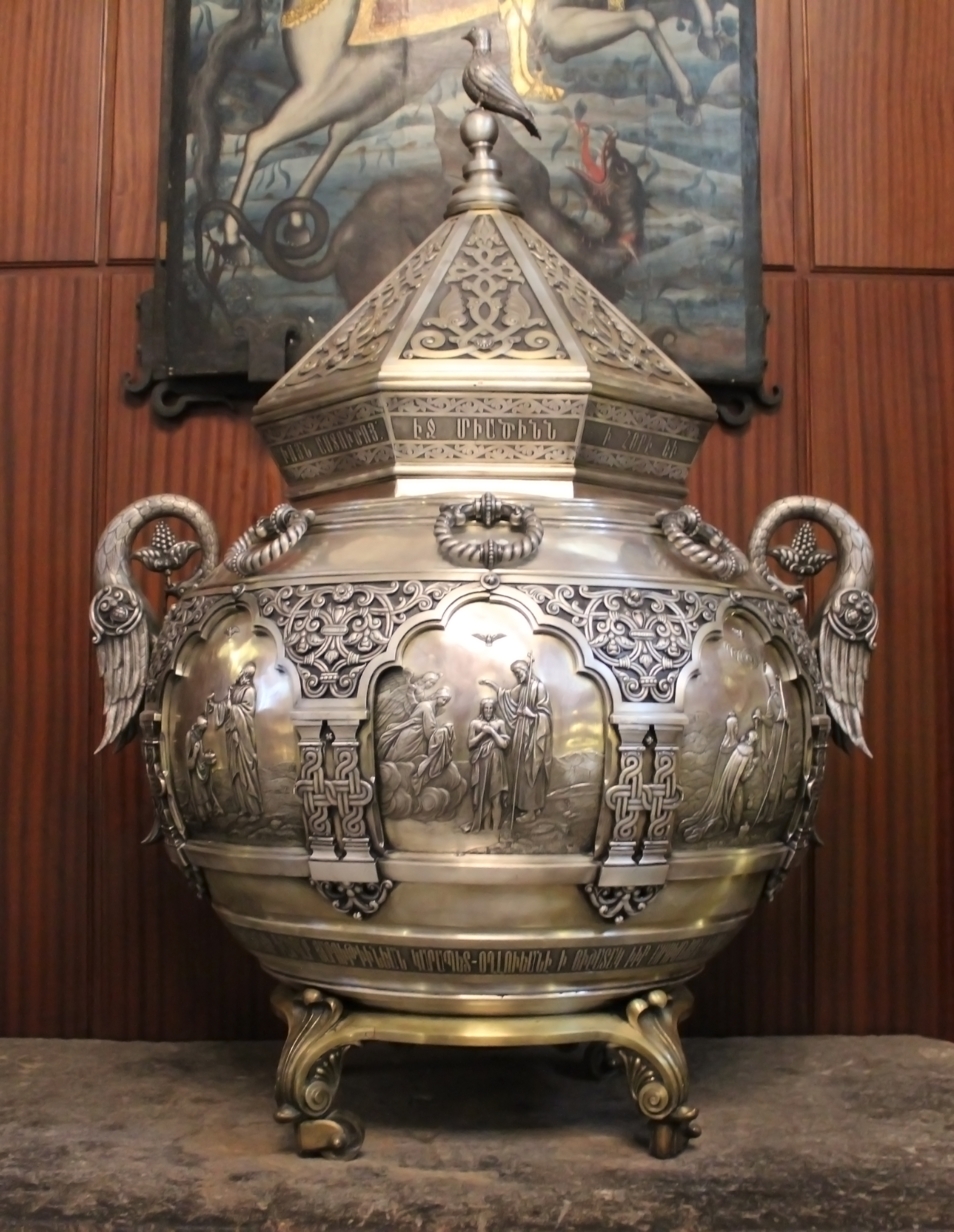
Main Chrismarium in Armenian Apostolic Church. Vessel made by silver and kept in Echmiadzin's treasures museum.

In the Malankara Orthodox Syrian Church (Jacobite Fraction), it is believed that Christ taught the holy apostles how to consecrate the myron or chrism. As a tradition, usually the primate or Catholicos of the East as appointed by Patariach consecrate the chrism.(Metropolitans can consecrate if needed) The primate is clothed in white vestments, "corresponding to the light of his soul, and with the purity of his person, as the mystery indicates to him that it should be offered to God in purity." Present with the primate are twelve priests who represent the twelve apostles, twelve censers indicating the preaching of the Gospel, twelve lamps to symbolize the luminous revelations that descend upon them and twelve fans to indicate that it is not right that the divine mysteries should be revealed to those who are unworthy.

The Armenian Apostolic Church consecrates myrrh every seven years in autumn at Etchmiadzin Cathedral in Armenia.

== See also ==
- Anointing of Jesus – Gospels event
- Charisma – Charm that can inspire devotion in others
- Holy Ampulla – Glass vial containing the chrism for French coronations from 1131 to 1774
- Misha (Mandaeism) – Anointing oil used in Mandaeans religious rituals
- Oil of Saints – Liquid which is said to flow from the relics or burial places of Christian saints
