= Cake of Light =

Eucharistic host in Thelema

The Cake of Light is the eucharistic host found within Thelema, the religion founded by English occult writer Aleister Crowley in 1904. A cake of light contains flour, honey, Abramelin oil, olive oil, beeswing, and bodily fluids such as semen, menstrual blood, vaginal fluids, or a mix thereof. It is usually cooked in the shape of a small, flat wafer. It appears by name in two important Thelemic rituals, the Gnostic Mass and the Mass of the Phoenix.

== Ingredients and Symbolism ==
Per the instructions in The Book of the Law, the Cake of Light is composed of meal, honey, red wine lees (dregs), oil of Abramelin, olive oil and fresh blood, and may take the form of a perfume or incense. The Cake of Light may also resemble a eucharist-like cake when baked or burned.

The overall significance of the cakes is that it is considered to be a eucharist: a symbolic union between the microcosm, Man, and the macrocosm, the Divine, the consumption of which affirms a connection between the two which strengthens with each sacrament.

Olive oil is considered a sacred oil by many cultures and religions of the world. It is also an ingredient in the making of Oil of Abramelin. The olive is noted by Aleister Crowley as "traditionally, the gift of Minerva, the Wisdom of God, the Logos".

Abramelin oil was considered by Crowley to be representative of the "whole Tree of Life. The ten Sephiroth are blended into the perfect gold". It is thus also a symbol of the Philosopher's Stone of the Alchemists.

== In The Book of the Law ==
Although Cakes of Light are never mentioned by name in The Book of the Law, Crowley interpreted the following passages as being instructions for their creation:

For perfume mix meal & honey & thick leavings of red wine: then oil of Abramelin and olive oil, and afterward soften & smooth down with rich fresh blood.
The best blood is of the moon, monthly: then the fresh blood of a child, or dropping from the host of heaven: then of enemies; then of the priest or of the worshippers: last of some beast, no matter what.
This burn: of this make cakes & eat unto me. This hath also another use; let it be laid before me, and kept thick with perfumes of your orison: it shall become full of beetles as it were and creeping things sacred unto me.

Aleister Crowley described the Cakes of Light in his book Magick in Theory and Practice:

The Cakes of Light are universally applicable; they contain meal, honey, and oil (carbohydrates, fats, and proteins, the three necessaries of human nutrition): also the perfume of the three essential types of magical and curative virtue; the subtle principle of animal life itself is fixed in them by the introduction of fresh living blood.

Various types of blood are given as acceptable within a Cake of Light. "Of the moon, monthly" refers to menstrual blood. "Of a child" refers to fluid from sexual intercourse. "From the host of heaven" refers to semen. "Of enemies; then of the priest or of the worshippers" is self-explanatory. "Last of some beast" refers to animal blood.

Crowley thought that it was important for ceremonial magicians to perform a eucharistic ritual of some kind daily:

A Eucharist of some sort should most assuredly be consummated daily by every magician, and he should regard it as the main sustenance of his magical life. It is of more importance than any other magical ceremony, because it is a complete circle. The whole of the force expended is completely re-absorbed; yet the virtue is that vast gain represented by the abyss between Man and God.

The magician becomes filled with God, fed upon God, intoxicated with God. Little by little his body will become purified by the internal lustration of God; day by day his mortal frame, shedding its earthly elements, will become in very truth the Temple of the Holy Ghost. Day by day matter is replaced by Spirit, the human by the divine; ultimately the change will be complete; God manifest in flesh will be his name.

== See also ==
- Body of light
- Sefer HaRazim
- Religious consumption of blood
