= Holy anointing oil =

Oil used to sanctify, to set the anointed person or object apart

In the ancient Israelite religion, the holy anointing oil (Biblical Hebrew: שמן המשחה, romanized: šemen ham-mišḵā, lit. 'the oil of anointing') formed an integral part of the ordination of the priesthood and the High Priest as well as in the consecration of the articles of the Tabernacle (Exodus 30:26) and subsequent temples in Jerusalem. The primary purpose of anointing with the holy anointing oil was to sanctify, to set the anointed person or object apart as qodesh, or "holy" (Exodus 30:29).

Originally, the oil was used exclusively for the priests and the Tabernacle articles, but its use was later extended to include kings (1 Samuel 10:1). It was forbidden to be used on an outsider (Exodus 30:33) or to be used on the body of any common person (Exodus 30:32a) and the Israelites were forbidden to duplicate any like it for themselves (Exodus 30:32b).

Some segments of Christianity have continued the practice of using holy anointing oil as a devotional practice, as well as in various liturgies. A variant form, known as oil of Abramelin, is used in Ecclesia Gnostica Catholica, the ecclesiastical arm of Ordo Templi Orientis (O.T.O.), an international fraternal initiatory organization devoted to promulgating the Law of Thelema.

A number of religious groups have traditions of continuity of the holy anointing oil, with part of the original oil prepared by Moses remaining to this day. These groups include rabbinical Judaism, the Armenian Church, the Assyrian Church of the East, The Church of Jesus Christ of Latter-day Saints, the Coptic Church, the Saint Thomas Nazrani churches, and others.

== Biblical recipe ==
The holy anointing oil described in Exodus 30:22–25 was created from:

- Pure myrrh resin (מָר-דְּרוֹר, mār-dərōr) 500 shekels (about 6 kg (13 lb))
- Sweet cinnamon (קִנְּמָן-בֶּשֶׂם, qīnnəmōn-besem) 250 shekels (about 3 kg (6.6 lb))
- "Fragrant cane" (קְנֵה-בֹשֶׂם, qənē-ḇōsem, sometimes translated as calamus) 250 shekels (about 3 kg (6.6 lb))
- Cassia oil (קִדָּה, qīddā) 500 shekels (about 6 kg (13 lb))
- Olive oil (שֶׁמֶן זַיִת, šemen zayīt) one hin (about 6 L (1.3 imp gal; 1.6 US gal), or 5.35 kg (11.8 lb))

=== Identification of kaneh bosem ===
While sources agree about the identity of four of the five ingredients of anointing oil, the identity of the fifth, kaneh bosem, has been a matter of debate. The Bible indicates that it was an aromatic cane or grass, which was imported from a distant land by way of the spice routes, and that a related plant grows in Israel (kaneh bosem is referenced as a cultivated plant in the Song of Songs 4:14. Several different plants have been named as possibly being the kaneh bosem.

==== Acorus calamus ====
Most lexicographers, botanists, and biblical commentators translate kaneh bosem as "cane balsam". The Aramaic Targum Onkelos renders the Hebrew kaneh bosem in Aramaic as q'nei busma. Ancient translations and sources identify this with the plant variously referred to as sweet cane, or sweet flag (the Septuagint, the Rambam on Kerithoth 1:1, Saadia Gaon and Jonah ibn Janah). This plant is known to botanists as Acorus calamus. According to Aryeh Kaplan in The Living Torah, "It appears that a similar species grew in the Holy Land, in the Hula region in ancient times (Theophrastus, History of Plants 9:7)."

==== Cymbopogon ====
Maimonides, in contrast, indicates that it was the Indian plant, rosha grass (Cymbopogon martinii), which resembles red straw. Many standard reference works on Bible plants by Michael Zohary (University of Jerusalem, Cambridge, 1985), James A. Duke (2010), and Hans Arne Jensen (Danish 2004, English translation 2012) support this conclusion, arguing that the plant was a variety of Cymbopogon. James A. Duke, quoting Zohary, notes that it is "hopeless to speculate" about the exact species, but that Cymbopogon citratus (Indian lemon-grass) and Cymbopogon schoenanthus are also possibilities. Kaplan follows Maimonides in identifying it as the Cymbopogon martinii or palmarosa plant.

==== Cannabis ====
Sula Benet, in Early Diffusion and Folk Uses of Hemp (1967), identified it as cannabis. Rabbi Aryeh Kaplan notes that "On the basis of cognate pronunciation and Septuagint readings, some identify Keneh bosem with the English and Greek cannabis, the hemp plant." Benet argued that equating Keneh Bosem with sweet cane could be traced to a mistranslation in the Septuagint, which mistook Keneh Bosem, later referred to as "cannabos" in the Talmud, as "kalabos", a common Egyptian marsh cane plant.

== In Judaism ==
=== In the ancient Near East ===
Customs varied in the cultures of the Middle East. However, anointing with special oil in Israel was either a strictly priestly or kingly right. When a prophet was anointed, it was because he was first a priest. When a non-king was anointed, such as Elijah's anointing of Hazael and Jehu, it was a sign that Hazael was to become king of Aram (Syria) and Jehu was to become king of Israel. Extra-biblical sources show that it was common to anoint kings in many ancient Near Eastern monarchies. Therefore, in Israel, anointing was not only a sacred act but also a socio-political one.

In the Hebrew Bible, bad smells appear as indications of the presence of disease, decay, rotting processes and death (Exodus 7:18), while pleasant aromas suggest places that were biologically clean and conducive to habitation and/or food production and harvesting. Spices and oils were chosen which assisted mankind in orienting themselves and in creating a sense of safety as well as a sense of elevation above the physical world of decay. The sense of smell was also considered highly esteemed by deity. In Deuteronomy 4:28 and Psalms 115:5–6, the sense of smell is included in connection with the polemics against idols. In the Hebrew Bible God takes pleasure in inhaling the "soothing odor" (reah hannihoah) of offerings (Genesis 8:21; the phrase is also seen in other verses).

To the ancient Israelite there was no oil or fat with more symbolic meaning than olive oil. It was used as an emollient, a fuel for lighting lamps, for nutrition, and for many other purposes. It was scented olive oil that was chosen to be a holy anointing oil for the Israelites.

=== In Rabbinic Judaism ===
The Talmud asserts that the original anointing oil prepared by Moses remained miraculously intact and was used by future generations without replacement, including in the future Third Temple when it is rebuilt. This suggests that, following ancient customs, new oil was added to the old thus continuing the original oil for all time.

== In Christianity ==
Anointing oil is used in Christian communities for various reasons. Anointing of the sick is prescribed in this passage in the New Testament:

Is any sick among you? let him call for the elders of the church; and let them pray over him, anointing him with oil in the name of the Lord.

— James 5:14 (KJV)

The epithet "Christ" as a title for Jesus refers to "the anointed one".

=== In the Armenian Church ===
The holy anointing oil of the Armenian Church is called the holy muron ('muron' means myrrh). The church holds a special reverence for the continuity factor of the oil. According to tradition, a portion of the holy anointing oil of Exodus 30, which Moses and Aaron had blessed, still remained in Jesus' time. Jesus Christ blessed this oil and then gave some of it to Thaddeus, who took the holy oil to Armenia and healed King Abkar of a terrible skin disease by anointing him with the holy oil. Thaddeus is said to have buried a bottle of the holy anointing oil in Daron under an evergreen tree. Gregory the Illuminator discovered the hidden treasure and mixed it with muron that he had blessed. It is said that "To this day, whenever a new batch of muron is prepared and blessed, a few drops of the old one go into it, so that the Armenian muron always contains a small amount of the original oil blessed by Moses, Jesus Christ, and Gregory the Illuminator."

The holy muron is composed of olive oil and 48 aromas and flowers. The remaining portion of the previous blessed holy oil is poured into the newly prepared oil during the blessing ceremony and passes the blessing from generation to generation. It is said that this procedure has been followed for nearly 1700 years. The Catholicos of all Armenians in Etchmiadzin combines a new mixture of holy muron in the cauldron every seven years using a portion of the holy muron from the previous blend. This is distributed to all of the Armenian churches throughout the world. Before Christianity, muron was reserved solely for the enthroning of royalty and for very special events. In later years, it was used with extreme unction and to heal the sick, and to anoint ordained clergy.

=== In the Assyrian Church of the East ===
It is said by the Assyrian Church that the holy anointing oil "was given and handed down to us by our holy fathers Mar Addai and Mar Mari and Mar Tuma." The holy anointing oil of the Assyrian Church is variously referred to as the Oil of the Holy Horn, the Oil of the Qarna, or the Oil of Unction. This holy oil is an apostolic tradition, believed to have originated from the oil consecrated by the apostles themselves, and which by succession has been handed down in the Church into the modern day. The original oil which the disciples blessed began to run low and more oil was added to it. The Assyrian Church believes that this has continued to this very day with new oil being added as the oil level lowers. This succession of holy oil is believed to be a continuity of the blessings placed upon the oil from the beginning.

Both the Oil of Unction and the Holy Leaven are referred to as "leaven", although there is no actual leavening agent present in the oil. Yohanan bar Abgareh referred to the oil in 905, as did Shlemon d-Basra in the 13th century. Yohanan bar Zo'bee in the 14th century integrated the Holy Oil of unction with baptism and other rites.

Isaaq Eshbadhnaya in the 15th century wrote the Scholion which is a commentary on specific theological topics, stating that John the Baptist gave John the Evangelist a baptismal vessel of water from Christ's baptism, which was collected by John the Baptist from water dripping from Christ after his baptism in Jordan River. Jesus gave each disciple a "loaf," at the Last Supper, but the Scholion states that to John he gave two loaves, with the instructions to eat only one and to save the other. At the crucifixion, John collected the water from Jesus's side in the vessel and the blood he collected on the loaf from the Last Supper. After the descent of the Holy Spirit on Pentecost the disciples took the vessel and mixed it with oil and each took a horn of it. The loaf they ground up and added flour and salt to it. Each took a portion of the holy oil and the holy bread which were distributed in every land by the hand of those who missionized there.

The Assyrian Church has two types of holy oils; the one is ordinary olive oil, blessed or not blessed, the other is the oil of the Holy Horn which is believed to have been handed down from the apostles. The Holy Horn is constantly renewed by the addition of oil blessed by a bishop on Maundy Thursday. While almost anyone can by tradition be anointed with the regular oil, the oil of the Holy Horn is restricted for ordination and sanctification purposes.

=== In the Coptic Church ===
The holy anointing oil of the Coptic Church is referred to as the holy myron ('myron' means myrrh). The laying on of hands for the dwelling of the Holy Spirit is believed to have been a specific rite of the apostles and their successors the bishops, and as the regions of mission increased, consequently numbers of Christian believers and converts increased. It was not possible for the apostles to wander through all the countries and cities to lay hands on all of those baptized, so they established anointment by the holy myron as an alternative, it is believed, for the laying on of the hands for the Holy Spirit's indwelling.

The first who made the myron were the apostles who had kept the fragrant oils which were on the body of Jesus Christ during his burial, and they added the spices which were brought by those women who prepared them to anoint Christ, but had discovered he had been resurrected. They melted all these spices in pure olive oil, prayed on it in the upper room in Zion, and made it a holy anointing oil. They decided that their successors, the bishops, must renew the making of the myron whenever it is nearly used up, by incorporating the original oil with the new. Today the Coptic Church uses it for ordination, in the sanctification of baptismal water, and in the consecration of churches and church altars and vessels.

It is said that when Mark the Evangelist went to Alexandria, he took with him some of the holy myron oil made by the apostles and that he used it in the sacrament of Chrism, as did the patriarchs who succeeded him. This continued until the era of Athanasius the Apostolic, the 20th patriarch, who then decided to remake the myron in Alexandria. Hence, it is reported, he prepared all of the needed perfumes and spices, with pure olive oil, from which God ordered Moses to make the holy anointing oil as specified in the recipe in the thirtieth chapter of the book of Exodus. Then the sanctification of the holy myron was fulfilled in Alexandria, and Athanasius was entrusted with the holy oil, which contained spices which touched Jesus's body while it was in the tomb, as well as the original oil which had been prepared by the apostles and brought to Egypt by Mark. He distributed the oil to the churches abroad: to the See of Rome, Antioch and Constantinople, together with a document of its authenticity, and all of the patriarchs are said to have rejoiced in receiving it.

The Coptic Church informs that the fathers of the Church and scholars like Justin Martyr, Tertullian, Hippolytus, Origen, Ambrose, and Cyril of Jerusalem, spoke about the holy myron and how they received its use in anointing by tradition. For example, Hippolytus, in his Apostolic Tradition, speaks of the holy oil "according to ancient custom" Origen writes about the holy oil "according to the tradition of the church" Cyril of Jerusalem goes into further detail in speaking about the grace of the Holy Spirit in the holy myron: "this oil is not just any oil, this is M&S oil: after the epiclesis of the Spirit, it becomes charism of Christ and power of the Holy Spirit through the presence of the deity".

The early fathers and scholars mention the use of the holy myron, as well as a documentation by Abu'l-Barakat Ibn Kabar, a 14th-century Coptic priest and scholar, in his book Misbah az-Zulmah fi idah al-khidmah (The Lamp of Darkness in Clarifying the Service). According to his account, the holy apostles took from the spices that were used to anoint the body of Jesus Christ when he was buried, added pure olive oil to it, and prayed over it in Upper Zion, the first church where the Holy Spirit fell in the upper room.

This holy oil was then distributed among all of the apostles so that wherever they preached, new converts would be anointed with it as a seal. They also commanded that whenever a new batch of Holy Myron was made, they add to it the old holy myron to keep the first holy myron continually with all that would ever be made afterwards.

According to the available resources, the holy myron in the Church of Egypt has been made 34 times.

=== Among the Saint Thomas Christians and Nasranis ===
According to tradition, Thomas the Apostle laid the original foundation for Christianity in India. It is reported that Jewish communities already present in India enticed Thomas to make his missionary journey there. It is said that he brought holy anointing oil with him and that the St. Thomas Christians still have this oil to this day.

Patriarch Ya'qub, of the Syrian Malabar Nasrani Church, is remembered for his celebration of the liturgy and his humble encouragement to accept the simple way of life. After he consecrated sacred myron in the Mor Gabriel monastery in 1964, holy myron flowed from the glass container the following day and many people were said to have been healed by it.

=== In the Baptist, Methodist and Pentecostal churches ===
In many evangelical denominations, such as those of the Baptist, Methodist and Pentecostal traditions, holy anointing oil is often used in the anointing of the sick and in deliverance ministry. It is additionally used "anoint babies as a sign of blessing and protection for the new life ahead" and to "anoint clergy as they begin a new assignment in ministry". Bottles of holy anointing oil are often sold at Christian religious goods stores, being purchased by both clergy and laity for use in prayer or house blessings.

== In Mandaeism ==
In Mandaeism, anointing sesame oil, called misha (ࡌࡉࡔࡀ) in Mandaic, is used during rituals such as the masbuta (baptism) and masiqta (death mass), both of which are performed by Mandaean priests.

== In Western esotericism and Thelema ==
=== Abramelin oil ===
Abramelin oil, also called oil of Abramelin, is an anointing oil used in Western esotericism, especially in ceremonial magic. It is blended from aromatic plant materials. Its name came about due to its having been described in a medieval grimoire called The Book of the Sacred Magic of Abramelin the Mage (1897) written by Abraham the Jew (presumed to have lived from c. 1362 – c. 1458). The recipe is adapted from that of the biblical holy anointing oil described in the Book of Exodus (30:22-25) and attributed to Moses. In the English translation The Book of Abramelin: A New Translation (2006) by Steven Guth of Georg Dehn, which was compiled from all the known German manuscript sources, the formula reads as follows:

Take one part of the best myrrh, half a part of cinnamon, one part of cassia, one part galanga root, and a quarter of the combined total weight of good, fresh olive oil. Make these into an ointment or oil as is done by the chemists. Keep it in a clean container until you need it. Put the container together with the other accessories in the cupboard under the altar.

In the first printed edition, Peter Hammer, 1725, the recipe reads:

Nimm Myrrhen des besten 1 Theil, Zimmt 1/2 Theil, soviel des Calmus als Zimmet, Cassien soviel als der Myrrhen im Gewicht und gutes frisches Baumöl..." (Take 1 part of the best myrrh, 1/2 part cinnamon, as much calamus as cinnamon, of cassia as much as the myrrh in weight and good fresh tree oil...)

Note that the proportions in this edition conform with the recipe for holy anointing oil from the Bible (Exodus 30:22-25).

The original popularity of Abramelin oil rested on the importance magicians place upon Jewish traditions of holy oils and, more recently, upon S. L. MacGregor Mathers' translation of The Book of Abramelin and the resurgence of 20th-century occultism, such as found in the works of the Hermetic Order of the Golden Dawn and Aleister Crowley, the founder of Thelema, who used a similar version of the oil in his system of Magick, and has since spread into other modern occult traditions. There are multiple recipes in use today.

This oil is currently used in several ceremonies of the Thelemic church, Ecclesia Gnostica Catholica, including the rites of confirmation and ordination. It is also commonly used to consecrate magical implements and temple furniture. The eucharistic host of the Gnostic Mass—called the Cake of Light—includes this oil as an important ingredient.

=== Recipes ===
==== Samuel Mathers' recipe ====
According to the S. L. MacGregor Mathers English translation from 1897, which derives from an incomplete French manuscript copy of The Book of Abramelin, the recipe is:

You shall prepare the sacred oil in this manner: Take of myrrh in tears, one part; of fine cinnamon, two parts; of galangal half a part; and the half of the total weight of these drugs of the best oil olive. The which aromatics you shall mix together according unto the art of the apothecary, and shall make thereof a balsam, the which you shall keep in a glass vial which you shall put within the cupboard (formed by the interior) of the altar.

==== Crowley's recipe using essential oils ====
Early in the 20th century, the Aleister Crowley created his own version of Abramelin oil, which is called "oil of Abramelin" in The Book of the Law. It was based on S. L. MacGregor Mathers' substitution of galangal for calamus. Crowley also abandoned the book's method of preparation—which specifies blending myrrh "tears" (resin) and "fine" (finely ground) cinnamon—instead opting for using distilled essential oils in a base of olive oil. His recipe (from his commentary to The Book of the Law) reads as follows:

- 8 parts cinnamon essential oil
- 4 parts myrrh essential oil
- 2 parts galangal essential oil
- 7 parts olive oil

Crowley weighed out his proportions of essential oils according to the recipe specified by Mathers' translation for weighing out raw materials. The result is to give the cinnamon a strong presence, so that when it is placed upon the skin "it should burn and thrill through the body with an intensity as of fire". This formula is unlike the grimoire recipe and it cannot be used for practices that require the oil to be poured over the head. Rather, Crowley intended it to be applied in small amounts, usually to the top of the head or the forehead, and to be used for anointing of magical equipment as an act of consecration.

=== Symbolism ===
Oil of Abramelin was seen as highly important by Crowley, and he used his version of it throughout his life. In Crowley's magical system, the oil came to symbolize the aspiration to what he called the Great Work—"The oil consecrates everything that is touched with it; it is his aspiration; all acts performed in accordance with that are holy". Crowley went on to say:

The Holy Oil is the Aspiration of the Magician; it is that which consecrates him to the performance of the Great Work; and such is its efficacy that it also consecrates all the furniture of the Temple and the instruments thereof. It is also the grace or chrism; for this aspiration is not ambition; it is a quality bestowed from above. For this reason the Magician will anoint first the top of his head before proceeding to consecrate the lower centres in their turn (...) It is the pure light translated into terms of desire. It is not the Will of the Magician, the desire of the lower to reach the higher; but it is that spark of the higher in the Magician which wishes to unite the lower with itself.

Crowley also had a symbolic view of the ingredients:

This oil is compounded of four substances. The basis of all is the oil of the olive. The olive is, traditionally, the gift of Minerva, the Wisdom of God, the Logos. In this are dissolved three other oils; oil of myrrh, oil of cinnamon, oil of galangal. The Myrrh is attributed to Binah, the Great Mother, who is both the understanding of the Magician and that sorrow and compassion which results from the contemplation of the Universe. The Cinnamon represents Tiphereth, the Sun -- the Son, in whom Glory and Suffering are identical. The Galangal represents both Kether and Malkuth, the First and the Last, the One and the Many, since in this Oil they are One. [...] These oils taken together represent therefore the whole Tree of Life. The ten Sephiroth are blended into the perfect gold.

=== Effects ===
Mathers' use of the ingredient galangal instead of calamus and/or Crowley's innovative use of essential oils rather than raw ingredients has resulted in some changes from the original recipe:

- Symbolism: In Jewish, Greek, and European magical botanic symbolism, the ascription given to sweet flag or calamus is generally that of fertility, due to the shape of the plant's fruiting body. Crowley gave the following Qabalistic meaning for galangal: "Galangal represents both Kether and Malkuth, the First and the Last, the One and the Many." Thus Crowley's substitution therefore shifts the symbolism to microcosm/macrocosm unity, which is reflective of Thelema's mystical aim—the union of the adept with the Absolute.
- Skin sensation: The original recipe for Abramelin oil does not irritate the skin and can be applied according to traditional Jewish and Christian religious and magical practices. Crowley's recipe has a much higher concentration of cinnamon than the original recipe. This results in an oil which can be noticeably hot on the skin and can cause skin rashes if applied too liberally.
- Digestive toxicity: Galangal is edible, calamus is not, as it has some toxicity. This is certainly relevant to those who use Crowley's oil of Abramelin as a core ingredient for the eucharistic Cake of Light, giving it a mild opiated taste (from the myrrh) and a spicy tang (from the cinnamon and the ginger-like galangal). Heavy use of calamus in such a recipe would render the host inedible.

== See also ==
- Anointing – Ritual act of putting aromatic oil on a person
- Holy water – Water blessed by a religious figure
- Shemen Afarsimon – Biblical oil
