= Misha (Mandaeism) =

Anointing oil used in Mandaeans religious rituals

In Mandaeism, misha (Classical Mandaic: ࡌࡉࡔࡀ, romanized: miša) is anointing sesame oil used during rituals such as the masbuta (baptism) and masiqta (death mass), both of which are performed by Mandaean priests.

== Etymology ==
The Mandaic word miša shares the same root with Mšiha ("Messiah"; Classical Mandaic: ࡌࡔࡉࡄࡀ, lit. 'The Anointed One'). However, Mandaeans do not use the word mšiha to refer to Mandaeans who have been anointed during rituals, in order to distance themselves from Christianity.

== In the Qulasta ==
Several prayers in the Qulasta are recited over the oil, including prayers 48, 63, and 73. In some prayers, misha referred to as misha dakia, or "pure oil."

== See also ==
- Holy anointing oil
- Oil of catechumens
- Riha (incense)
