= Chrism Mass =

Solemn Mass for blessings Holy Oils

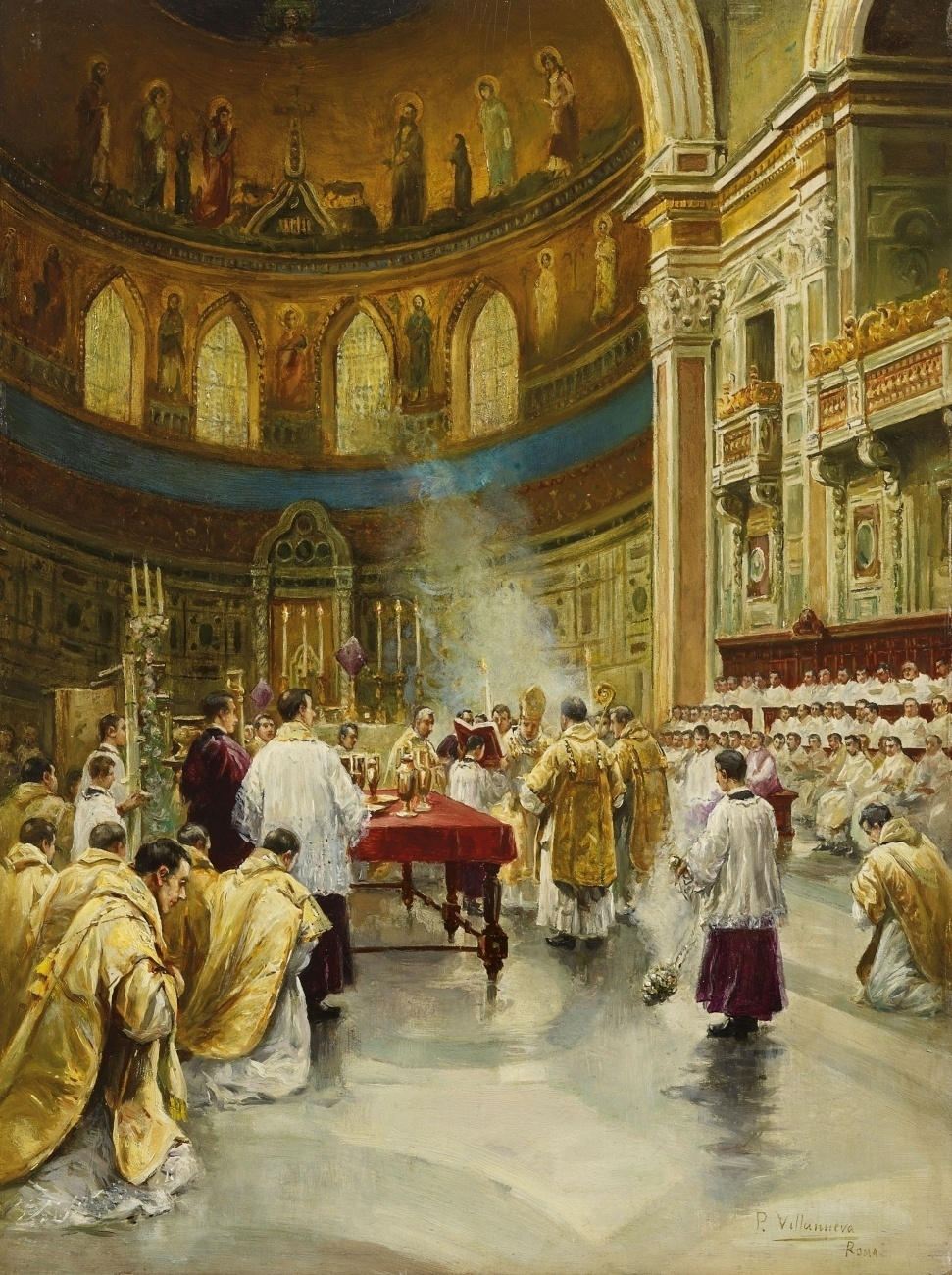
Blessing of the Chrism on Maundy Thursday in the Lateran Basilica. Signed P. Villanueva, circa 1900

The Chrism Mass is a religious service held in certain Christian denominations, such as Catholicism, Lutheranism, and Anglicanism. It is usually celebrated each year on Maundy Thursday or on another day of Holy Week. During the ceremony, the holy oils used for sacraments and rituals are blessed or consecrated.

== History ==
The Chrism Mass is one of the most solemn and important liturgies of the Christian liturgical calendar. The ancient Christian Apostolic Tradition (c. 200 AD) described a "ceremony taking place during the Easter Vigil at which two holy oils were blessed and one was consecrated." During this rite, two oils were "blessed by the bishop: the oil of the sick and the oil of exorcism".

== Ceremony ==
Maundy Thursday is the usual day in which this Mass is celebrated in a diocese or archdiocese. During this Mass, the following Holy Oils are consecrated or blessed:

- Chrism – used in the sacraments of Baptism, Confirmation and Holy Orders, as well as for the consecration of altars and the dedication of churches;
- the Oil of Catechumens (formerly known as the Oil of Exorcism)– also used in the sacrament of Baptism; and
- the Oil of the Sick – used only in the sacrament of the Anointing of the Sick.

The Chrism and Oil of the Catechumens are used during the Easter Vigil on Holy Saturday for the baptism and confirmation of adults, or children over the age of 10 who wish to fully enter the Church.

Holy Chrism is a mixture of olive oil and balsam, an aromatic resin. The balsam is poured into the oil, which gives it a sweet smell intended to remind those who encounter it of the "odour of sanctity" to which those who are marked with it are called to strive. The bishop then breathes over the vessel containing the Chrism, a gesture symbolizing the Holy Spirit coming down to consecrate this oil, and recalls the actions of Jesus in the Gospel account of John 20:22, when he breathed on the apostles and said, "Receive the Holy Spirit..." Most or all of the diocese’s priests, gathered to concelebrate the Mass, extend their hands towards the vessel of Chrism and silently say the chosen "Prayer of Consecration" along with the bishop, who recites it audibly over the Chrism.

== Traditions by Christian denomination ==
=== Catholicism ===
In the Latin Rite, the Chrism Mass was anciently and is currently celebrated on Maundy Thursday. In the 1800s, the Benedictine abbot Dom Prosper Guéranger wrote in his commentary The Liturgical Year: “For now many centuries, this great ceremony is celebrated at the single Mass, which is said on this day in commemoration of our Lord's Supper." In the 1955 reforms of Pope Pius XII, a separate Mass for the blessing of the Holy Oils was promulgated.

The blessing of the Oils is traditionally celebrated in the diocesan/archdiocesan cathedral, generally on the morning of Maundy Thursday. However, for practical reasons, many dioceses celebrate this Mass on another day during Holy Week. It is often the largest annual gathering of a diocese’s clergy and faithful. In some dioceses, attendance is sufficiently significant that, due to limited seating, tickets are distributed to parishes. The Mass is a celebration of the institution of the priesthood with Jesus' words at the Last Supper, "Do this in memory of Me." During the Mass, all present are called to renew their baptismal promises; priests and deacons (the ordained) are further called to reaffirm their ministry by renewing the vows made at their ordination.

During the Chrism Mass, the Rite of Reception of the Oils has representatives from every diocesan parish receive the three oils for storage in their respective parishes. This signifies each parish's unity with their bishop. Whenever the holy oils are used, the ministry of the bishop who blessed and consecrated them is symbolically present. The stock holy oils distributed are meant to last all year, although extra holy oils are also blessed during the Chrism Mass and kept at the cathedral as reserve if a parish runs out.

The present Mass is a 1967 restoration of a liturgy recorded in the early 200s by the historian Hippolytus, wherein the Easter Vigil had of blessing two holy oils and consecrating one. In the fifth century, the ceremony of the holy oils was transferred from the Easter Vigil to Maundy Thursday. A separate Mass for that purpose was instituted, and made distinct from the Mass of the Lord's Supper. The change took place not only due to the large crowds that assembled for the Easter Vigil on Holy Saturday night, but to fully emphasize Christ's institution of the ordained priesthood during what is traditionally called The Last Supper. In the decree renewing this rite, Pope Paul VI said "The Chrism Mass is one of the principal expressions of the fullness of the bishop’s priesthood and signifies the closeness of the priests with him."

While the Oil of the Catechumens and the Oil of the Sick are simply "blessed", the Sacred Chrism is "consecrated".

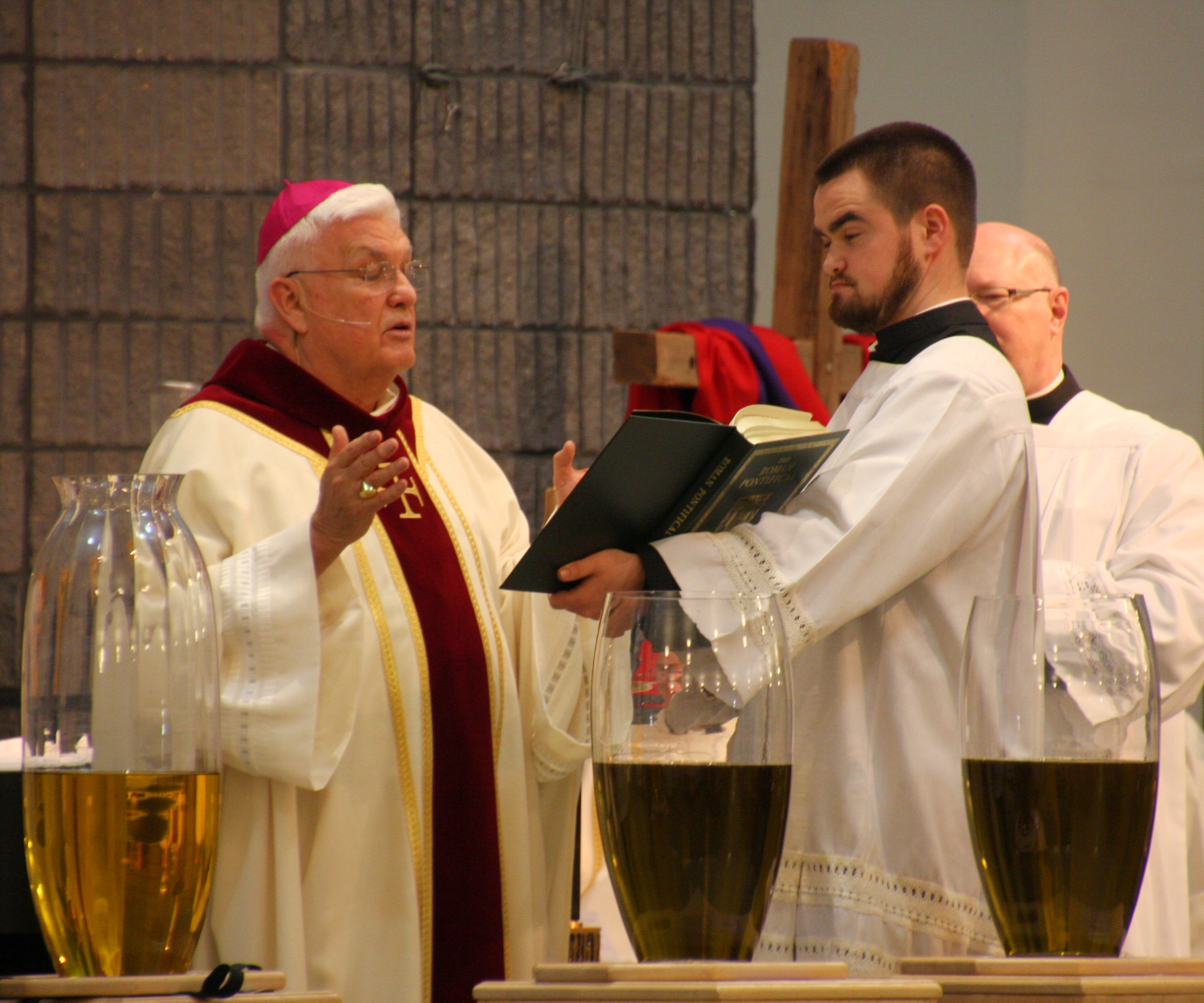
Blessing Chrism

=== Lutheranism ===
On Maundy Thursday, Lutherans also celebrate a Chrism Mass, which is presided over by a bishop. In the service, the holy oils are blessed and clergy renew their vows.

=== Anglicanism ===
The 1979 Book of Common Prayer (p. 307) used by the Episcopal Church of the United States of America calls for chrism to be consecrated by the bishop. This may be done when the bishop is present in the parish for Confirmation. In many dioceses, the consecration of chrism by the bishop may be done at a service of reaffirmation of ordination vows during Holy Week. Similar to the ritual in the Latin Rite of the Catholic Church, the service has the bishop also bless the oils for use throughout the next year in baptisms and healing. In addition, the bishop and clergy in attendance will reaffirm their Ordination Vows.
