= Oil of catechumens =

Oil used in some Christian baptisms

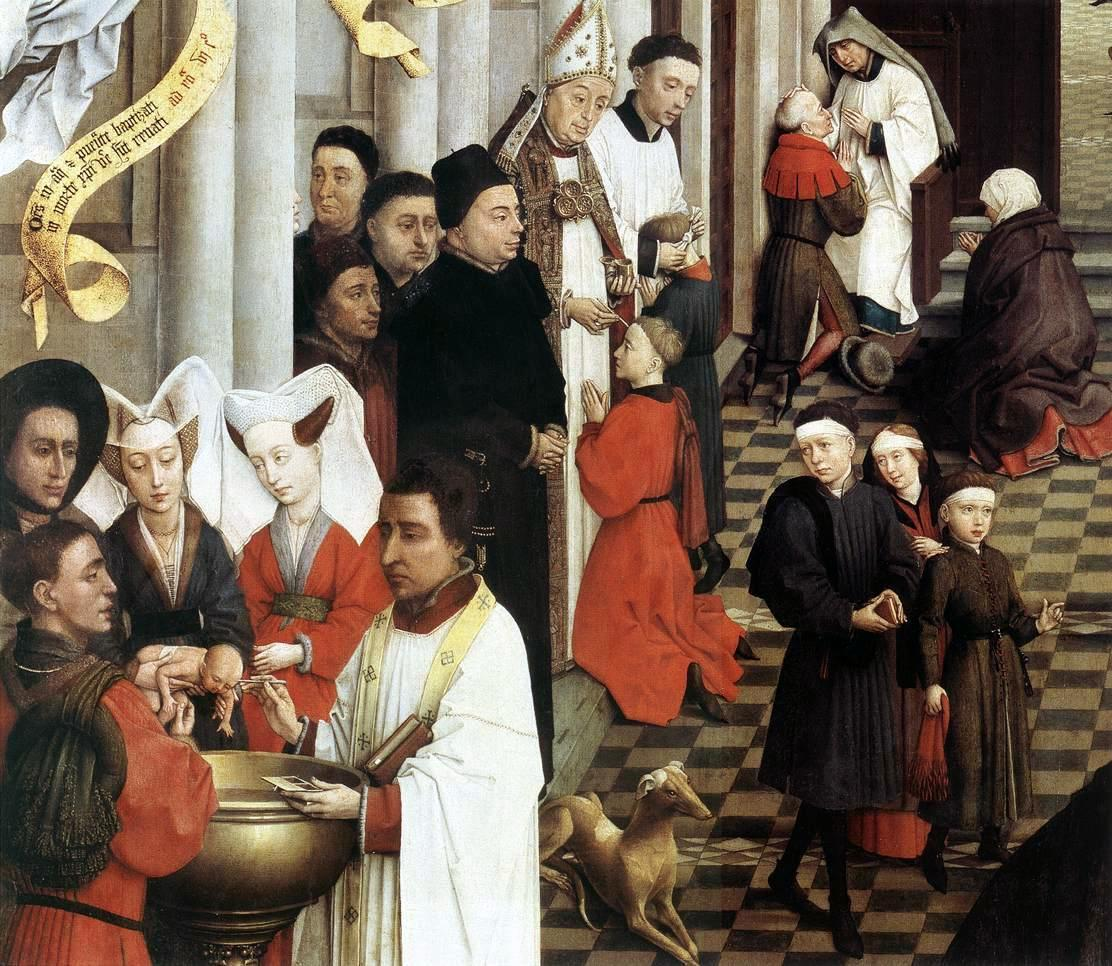
Detail from the Seven Sacraments Altarpiece by Rogier van der Weyden. In the lower left the priest is anointing an infant before it is baptized.

The oil of catechumens, also known as the oil of exorcism, is the oil used in some traditional Christian churches during baptism; it is believed to strengthen the one being baptized to turn away from evil, temptation and sin.

The oil of exorcism was mentioned in the ancient Christian apostolic tradition as being "used before baptisms to put to flight any contagions that might obstruct the impending baptismal graces". The Egyptian Church Order teaches that it is blessed during the Easter Vigil, the first liturgy of Eastertide.

The catechumen, the person prepared for baptism, is also anointed as a symbol of being the heir of the Kingdom of God, as kings and queens are anointed at coronations, and empowered for their Christian life as prophets were anointed for their ministry.

The oil of catechumens is intended to help strengthen the person about to be baptized, and prepare them for the struggle (ascesis) of the Christian life, the way a wrestler in ancient Greece and Rome was anointed before a wrestling match.

== Eastern Orthodoxy ==
In the Eastern Orthodox Church, the oil of catechumens is blessed by the priest during the baptismal rite. After the consecration of the baptismal water, a vessel of pure olive oil is brought to the priest by the deacon. The priest breathes on the oil three times and blesses it thrice, and says the prayer of blessing.

O Master, Lord God of our fathers, Who didst send unto them that were in the ark of Noah the dove, having in its beak a twig of olive, the token of reconciliation and of salvation from the flood the foreshadowing of the mystery of grace; and didst provide the fruit of the olive for the fulfilling of Thy holy Mysteries; Who thereby fillest them that were under the Law with Thy Holy Spirit, and perfectest them that are under grace: Do Thou Thyself bless also this holy oil with the power, and operation, and indwelling of Thy Holy Spirit, that it may be an anointing unto incorruption, an armour of righteousness, to the renewing of soul and body, to the averting of every assault of the devil, to deliverance from all evil of those who shall be anointed with it in faith, or who are partakers thereof; unto Thy glory, and the glory of Thine Only-begotten Son, and Thy most holy and good and life-creating Spirit, now and ever, and unto the ages of ages. Amen.

The priest then pours a portion of the oil into the baptismal font, making the sign of the cross with the oil three times, as all sing Alleluia. The priest gathers some of the oil floating on the surface of the water onto the first two fingers of his right hand and anoints the catechumen, making the sign of the cross on the brow, breast, between the shoulders, on the ears, hands and feet. The catechumen is then immediately baptized.

This anointing before baptism should not be confused with chrismation, which is a separate sacrament, though it is usually performed immediately after baptism.

== Roman Catholicism ==
In the Roman Catholic Church, the oil of catechumens is specially blessed by a bishop or a priest along with chrism and oil of the sick at the Chrism Mass, which takes place on Holy Thursday, or "if ... it should prove to be difficult for the clergy and people to gather with the bishop [on this day], this rite can be transferred to another day, but one always close to Easter". For example, the Chrism Mass may be celebrated on the Tuesday of Holy Week.

During the baptismal rite, the priest or deacon says the following words as he anoints with the oil in the shape of a cross: "We anoint you with the oil of salvation in the name of Christ our Savior; may he strengthen you with his power, who lives and reigns for ever and ever."

== See also ==
- Chrism
- Anointing of the sick
- Misha (Mandaeism)
