= History of LSD =

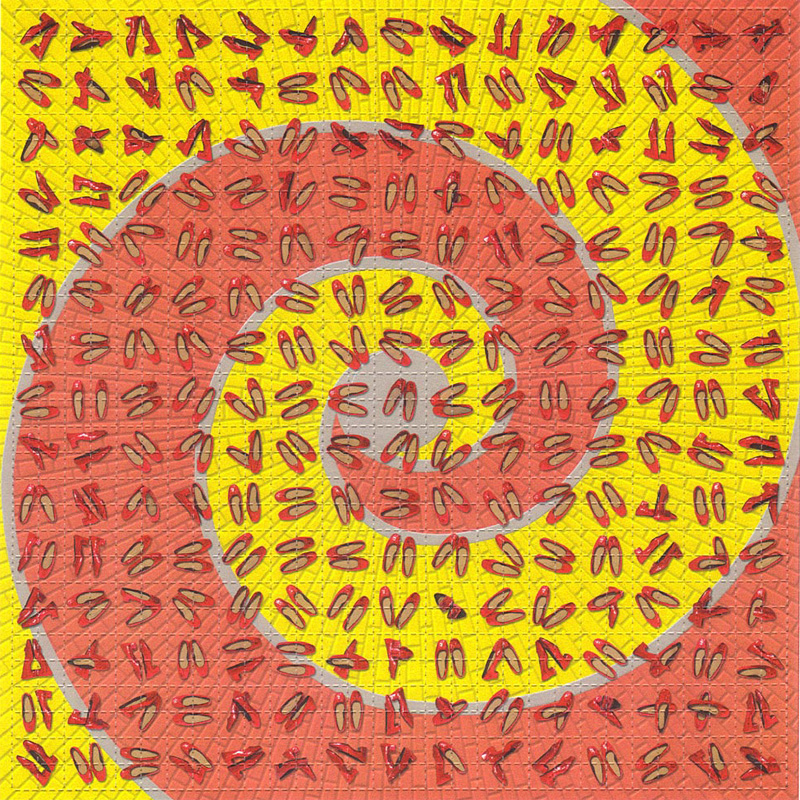
LSD blotter paper

The psychedelic drug (or entheogen) lysergic acid diethylamide (LSD) was first synthesized on November 16, 1938, by the Swiss chemist Albert Hofmann in the Sandoz laboratories in Basel, Switzerland. It was not until five years later on April 16, 1943, that the psychedelic properties were found.

== Discovery ==
Albert Hofmann, born in Switzerland, joined the pharmaceutical-chemical department of Sandoz Laboratories, located in Basel, as a co-worker with professor Arthur Stoll, founder and director of the pharmaceutical department. He began studying the medicinal plant squill and the fungus ergot as part of a program to purify and synthesize active constituents for use as pharmaceuticals. His main contribution was to elucidate the chemical structure of the common nucleus of Scilla glycosides (the active compound of maritime squill). While researching lysergic acid derivatives, Hofmann first synthesized LSD on November 16, 1938. The main intention of the synthesis was to obtain a respiratory and circulatory stimulant (an analeptic). It was set aside for five years, until April 16, 1943, when Hofmann decided to take a second look at it. While re-synthesizing LSD, he accidentally absorbed a small amount of the drug and discovered its powerful effects. He described what he felt as being:

... affected by a remarkable restlessness, combined with a slight dizziness. At home I lay down and sank into a not unpleasant intoxicated-like condition, characterized by an extremely stimulated imagination. In a dreamlike state, with eyes closed (I found the daylight to be unpleasantly glaring), I perceived an uninterrupted stream of fantastic pictures, extraordinary shapes with intense, kaleidoscopic play of colors. After about two hours this condition faded away.

=== Bicycle Day ===
Bicycle Day
- Type: Secular
- Celebrations: Consumption of lysergic acid diethylamide (LSD)
- Observances: Honors the anniversary of the first ever intentional acid trip, undergone by Swiss chemist Albert Hofmann on April 19, 1943, in Basel, Switzerland
- Date: April 19
- Next time: 19 April 2027
- Frequency: Annual

On April 19, 1943, Hofmann ingested 0.25 milligrams (250 micrograms) of the substance, which he estimated to be a small dose, but is actually about 10 times the minimum amount that produces a psychedelic effect. Between one and two hours later, Hofmann experienced slow and gradual changes in his perception. He asked his laboratory assistant to escort him home. As was customary in Basel, they made the journey by bicycle. On the way, Hofmann's condition rapidly deteriorated as he struggled with feelings of anxiety, alternating in his beliefs that the next-door neighbor was a malevolent witch, that he was going insane, and that the LSD had poisoned him. When the house doctor arrived, however, he could detect no physical abnormalities, save for a pair of widely dilated pupils. Hofmann was reassured, and soon his terror began to give way to a sense of good fortune and enjoyment, as he later wrote:

... Little by little I could begin to enjoy the unprecedented colors and plays of shapes that persisted behind my closed eyes. Kaleidoscopic, fantastic images surged in on me, alternating, variegated, opening and then closing themselves in circles and spirals, exploding in colored fountains, rearranging and hybridizing themselves in constant flux ...

The events of this first LSD trip, now known as "Bicycle Day", after the bicycle ride home, proved to Hofmann that he had indeed made a significant discovery: a psychoactive substance with extraordinary potency, capable of causing significant shifts of consciousness in incredibly low doses. (The term trip was first coined by US Army scientists during the 1950s when they were experimenting with LSD.) Hofmann foresaw the drug as a powerful psychiatric tool; because of its intense and introspective nature, he could not imagine anyone using it recreationally.

Bicycle Day is an informal celebration on April 19th of the anniversary of this first LSD trip, and the psychedelic revolution in general. It is sometimes celebrated by riding a bike on psychedelics and/or in a parade, and often with psychedelic-themed festivities. The celebration of Bicycle Day originated in DeKalb, Illinois, in 1985, when Thomas B. Roberts, then a professor at Northern Illinois University, invented the name "Bicycle Day" (Note: Dr. Hofmann asked Roberts why he had called it Bicycle Day instead of LSD Day: "I told him that the bicycle was a more concrete image than a chemical structure, and in America there is a famous poem that marks the start of our revolution in 1775 that makes a parallel with his ride...") when he founded the first celebration at his home. Several years later, he sent an announcement made by one of his students to friends and Internet lists, thus propagating the idea and the celebration. His original intent was to commemorate Hofmann's original, accidental exposure on April 16, but that date fell midweek and was not a good time for the party, so he chose the 19th to honor Hofmann's first intentional exposure.

=== Publication ===
LSD was first published in the scientific literature by Hofmann and his colleague psychiatrist Werner Stoll in 1943 and the hallucinogenic effects of LSD were first published by Stoll in 1947.

== Psychiatric use ==
Sandoz manufactured LSD for research use, and provided ampules to qualified researchers under the trade-name Delysid in 1947.

LSD was brought to the attention of the United States in 1949 by Sandoz Laboratories because they believed LSD might have clinical applications.

Throughout the 1950s, mainstream media reported on research into LSD and its growing use in psychiatry, and undergraduate psychology students taking LSD as part of their education described the effects of the drug. Time magazine published six positive reports on LSD between 1954 and 1959.

LSD was originally perceived as a psychotomimetic capable of producing model psychosis. By the mid-1950s, LSD research was being conducted in major American medical centers, where researchers used LSD as a means of temporarily replicating the effects of mental illness. One of the leading authorities on LSD during the 1950s in the United States was the psychoanalyst Sidney Cohen. Cohen first took the drug on October 12, 1955, and expected to have an unpleasant trip, but was surprised when he experienced "no confused, disoriented delirium." He reported that the "problems and strivings, the worries and frustrations of everyday life vanished; in their place was a majestic, sunlit, heavenly inner quietude." Cohen immediately began his own experiments with LSD with the help of Aldous Huxley whom he had met in 1955. In 1957, with the help of psychologist Betty Eisner, Cohen began experimenting on whether or not LSD might have a helpful effect in facilitating psychotherapy, curing alcoholism, and enhancing creativity. Between 1957 and 1958, they treated 22 patients who had minor personality disorders. LSD was also given to artists in order to track their mental deterioration, but Huxley believed LSD might enhance their creativity. Between 1958 and 1962, psychiatrist Oscar Janiger tested LSD on more than 100 painters, writers, and composers.

In one study in the late 1950s, Humphry Osmond gave LSD to alcoholics in Alcoholics Anonymous who had failed to quit drinking. After one year, around 50% of the study group had not had a drink—a success rate that has never been duplicated by any other means. Bill Wilson, the founder of Alcoholics Anonymous, participated in medically supervised experiments on the effects of LSD on alcoholism and believed LSD could be used to cure alcoholics.

In the United Kingdom the use of LSD was pioneered by Ronald A. Sandison in 1952, at Powick Hospital, Worcestershire. A special LSD unit was set up in 1958. After Sandison left the hospital in 1964, medical superintendent Arthur Spencer took over and continued the clinical use of the drug until it was withdrawn from production by Sandoz in 1965. In all, 683 patients were treated with LSD in 13,785 separate sessions at Powick, but Spencer was the last member of the medical staff to use it.

From the late 1940s through the mid-1970s, extensive research and testing was conducted on LSD. During a 15-year period beginning in 1950, research on LSD and other hallucinogens generated over 1,000 scientific papers, several dozen books, and six international conferences. Overall, LSD was prescribed as treatment to over 40,000 patients. Film star Cary Grant was one of many men during the 1950s and 1960s who were given LSD in concert with psychotherapy. Many psychiatrists began taking the drug recreationally and sharing it with friends. Leary's experiments (see Timothy Leary below) spread LSD usage to a much wider segment of the general populace.

Sandoz halted LSD production in August 1965 after growing governmental protests at its proliferation among the general populace. The National Institute of Mental Health in the United States distributed LSD on a limited basis for scientific research. Scientific study of LSD largely ceased by about 1980 as research funding declined, and governments became wary of permitting such research, fearing that the results of the research might encourage illicit LSD use. By the end of the 20th century, there were few authorized researchers left, and their efforts were mostly directed towards establishing approved protocols for further work with LSD in easing the suffering of the dying and with drug addicts and alcoholics.

A 2014 study showed evidence that LSD can have therapeutic benefits in treating anxiety associated with life-threatening diseases. Rick Doblin, an American drug researcher, described the work as "a proof of concept" that he hoped would "break these substances out of the mold of the counterculture and bring them back to the lab as part of a psychedelic renaissance."

Eight subjects received a full 200-microgram dose of LSD while four others received one-tenth as much. Participants then took part in two LSD-assisted therapy sessions two to three weeks apart. Subjects who took the full dose experienced reductions in anxiety averaging 20 per cent while those given the low dose reported becoming more anxious.

When subjects taking the low dose were switched to the full dose they too showed reduced anxiety, with the positive effects lasting for up to a year. The effects of the drug itself lasted for up to 10 hours with participants talking to Gasser throughout the experience.

"These results indicate that when administered safely in a methodologically rigorous medically supervised psychotherapeutic setting, LSD can reduce anxiety," the study concludes, "suggesting that larger controlled studies are warranted."

== Resistance and prohibition ==
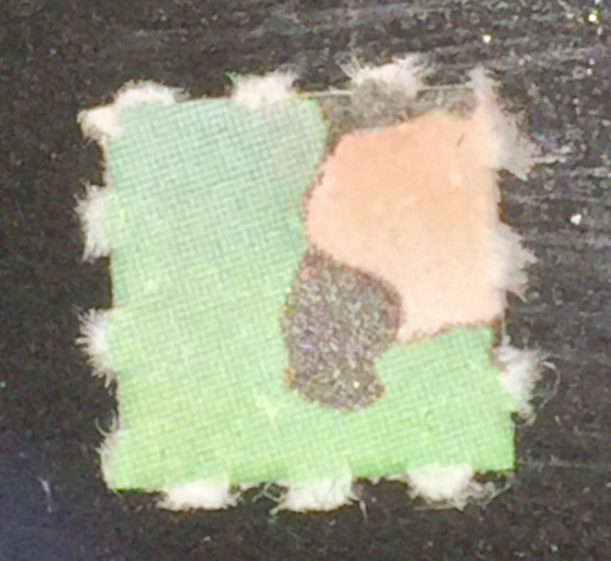
LSD blotter

By the mid-1960s the backlash against the use of LSD and its perceived corrosive effects on cultural values resulted in governmental action to restrict the availability of the drug by making use of it illegal. LSD was declared a "Schedule I" substance, legally designating that the drug has a "high potential for abuse" and is without any "currently accepted medical use in treatment." LSD was removed from legal circulation. The United States Drug Enforcement Administration claimed:

Although the initial observations on the benefits of LSD were highly optimistic, empirical data developed subsequently proved less promising ... Its use in scientific research has been extensive and its use has been widespread. Although the study of LSD and other hallucinogens increased the awareness of how chemicals could affect the mind, its use in psychotherapy largely has been debunked. It produces no aphrodisiac effects, does not increase creativity, has no lasting positive effect in treating alcoholics or criminals, does not produce a 'model psychosis', and does not generate immediate personality change.

However, drug studies have confirmed that the powerful hallucinogenic effects of this drug can produce profound adverse reactions, such as acute panic reactions, psychotic crises, and "flashbacks", especially in users ill-equipped to deal with such trauma.

The governors of Nevada and California each signed bills into law on May 30, 1966, that make them the first two American states to outlaw the manufacture, sale, and possession of the drug. The law went into effect immediately in Nevada, and on October 6, 1966, in California. Other U.S. states and many other countries soon followed with similar bans.

== Influential individuals ==
=== Aldous Huxley ===
Renowned British intellectual Aldous Huxley was one of the most important figures in the early history of LSD. He was a figure of high repute in the world of letters and had become internationally famous through his novels Crome Yellow, Antic Hay and his dystopian novel Brave New World. His experiments with psychedelic drugs (initially mescaline) and his descriptions of them in his writings did much to spread awareness of psychedelic drugs to the general public and arguably helped to glamorize their recreational use, although Huxley himself treated them very seriously.

Huxley was introduced to psychedelic drugs in 1953 by a friend, psychiatrist Humphry Osmond. Osmond had become interested in hallucinogens and their relationship to mental illness in the 1940s. During the 1950s, he completed extensive studies of a number of drugs, including mescaline and LSD. As noted above, Osmond had some remarkable success in treating alcoholics with LSD.

In May 1953 Osmond gave Huxley his first dose of mescaline at the Huxley home. In 1954 Huxley recorded his experiences in the landmark book The Doors of Perception; the title was drawn from a quotation by British artist and poet William Blake. Huxley tried LSD for the first time in 1955, obtained from "Captain" Al Hubbard.

=== Alfred Hubbard ===
Alfred Matthew Hubbard is reputed to have introduced more than 6,000 people to LSD, including scientists, politicians, intelligence officials, diplomats, and church figures. He became known as the original "Captain Trips", travelling about with a leather case containing pharmaceutically pure LSD, mescaline, and psilocybin. He became a "freelance" apostle for LSD in the early 1950s after supposedly receiving an angelic vision telling him that something important to the future of mankind would soon be coming. When he read about LSD the next year, he immediately sought and acquired LSD, which he tried for himself in 1951.

Although he had no medical training, Hubbard collaborated on running psychedelic sessions with LSD with Ross McLean at Vancouver's Hollywood Hospital, with psychiatrists Abram Hoffer and Humphry Osmond; with Myron Stolaroff at the International Federation for Advanced Study in Menlo Park, California; and with Willis Harman at the Stanford Research Institute (SRI). At various times over the next 20 years, Hubbard also reportedly worked for the Canadian Special Services, the U.S. Justice Department and the U.S. Bureau of Alcohol, Tobacco & Firearms. It is also rumored that he was involved with the CIA's MK-ULTRA project. How his government positions actually interacted with his work with LSD is unknown.

=== Harold A. Abramson ===
In 1955, Time magazine reported:

"In Manhattan, Psychiatrist Harold A. Abramson of the Cold Spring Harbor Biological Laboratory has developed a technique of serving dinner to a group of subjects, topping off the meal with a liqueur glass containing 40 micrograms of LSD."

This mention in America's most popular newsweekly is noteworthy because Abramson was not a psychiatrist or even a psychologist, but was an allergist who was a key participant in the CIA MK-ULTRA mind-control program.

=== R. Gordon Wasson ===
In 1957, R. Gordon Wasson, the vice president of J.P. Morgan, published an article in Life magazine extolling the virtues of magic mushrooms. This prompted Albert Hofmann to isolate psilocybin in 1958 for distribution by Sandoz with its product LSD in the U.S., further raising interest in LSD in the mass media. Following Wasson's report, Timothy Leary visited Mexico to experience the mushrooms.

=== Timothy Leary ===
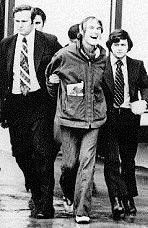
DEA agents Howard Safir (left) and Don Strange (right) with Leary in custody (1972)

Timothy Leary, a lecturer in psychology at Harvard University, was the most prominent pro-LSD researcher. Leary claimed that using LSD with the right dosage, set (one's emotional mindset at time of ingestion), and setting, preferably with the guidance of professionals, could alter behavior in dramatic and beneficial ways. Leary began conducting experiments with psilocybin in 1960 on himself and a number of Harvard graduate students after trying hallucinogenic mushrooms used in Native American religious rituals while visiting Mexico. His group began conducting experiments on state prisoners, where they claimed a 90% success rate preventing repeat offenses.

Later reexamination of Leary's data reveals his results to be skewed, whether intentionally or not; the percent of men in the study who ended up back in prison later in life was approximately 2% lower than the usual rate. Leary was later introduced to LSD, and he then incorporated that drug into his research as his mental catalyst of choice. Leary claimed that his experiments produced no murders, suicides, psychotic breaks, or bad trips. Almost all of Leary's participants reported profound mystical experiences which they felt had a tremendously positive effect on their lives. While it is true that Leary's experiments did not lead to any murders, he willfully chose to ignore the bad trips which occurred, as well as the attempted suicide of a woman the day after she was given mescaline by Leary.

By 1962, the Harvard faculty's disapproval with Leary's experiments reached critical mass. Leary was informed that the CIA was monitoring his research (see Government experiments below). Many of the other faculty members had harbored reservations about Leary's research, and parents began complaining to the university about Leary's distribution of hallucinogenic drugs to their children. Further, many undergraduate students who were not part of Leary's research program heard of the profound experiences other students had undergone and began taking LSD for recreational purposes, which was not illegal at the time . Leary described LSD as a potent aphrodisiac in an interview with Playboy magazine. Leary left the university for an extended amount of time during the spring semester, thus failing to fulfill his duties as professor. Leary and another Harvard psychologist, Richard Alpert, were dismissed from the university in 1963.

In 1964, they published The Psychedelic Experience: A Manual Based on the Tibetan Book of the Dead, which argued that the psychedelic experience paralleled the death/rebirth experience described in the Bardo Thodol (Tibetan Book of the Dead). Leary and Alpert, unfazed by their dismissals, relocated first to Mexico, but were expelled from the country by the Mexican government. They then set up at a large private mansion owned by William Hitchcock, named after the small town in New York State where it is located, Millbrook, where they continued their experiments. Their research lost its controlled scientific character as the experiments transformed into LSD parties. Leary later wrote, "We saw ourselves as anthropologists from the twenty-first century inhabiting a time module set somewhere in the Dark Ages of the 1960s. On this space colony, we were attempting to create a new paganism and a new dedication to life as art."

A judge who expressed dislike for Leary's books sentenced him to 30 years in prison for possession of half a marijuana cigarette in violation of the Marihuana Tax Act of 1937. However, this decision was reversed in the 1969 U.S. Supreme Court case Timothy Leary v. United States (395 U.S. 6) on the grounds that the Act required self-incrimination, thus violating the Fifth Amendment of the U.S. Constitution. Publicity surrounding the case further cemented Leary's growing reputation as a counter cultural guru. Around this time, President Richard Nixon described Leary as "the most dangerous man in America." Repeated FBI raids instigated the end of the Millbrook experiment. Leary refocused his efforts towards countering the tremendous amount of anti-LSD propaganda then being issued by the United States government, popularizing the slogan "Turn on, tune in, drop out." Many experts blame Leary and his activism for the near-total suppression of psychedelic research over the next 35 years.

=== Owsley Stanley ===
Historically, LSD was distributed not for profit, but because those who made and distributed it truly believed that the psychedelic experience could be beneficial for humanity. A limited number of chemists, probably fewer than a dozen, are believed to have manufactured nearly all of the illicit LSD available in the United States. The best known of these is undoubtedly Augustus Owsley Stanley III, usually known simply as Owsley or Bear. The former chemistry student set up a private LSD lab in the mid-60s in San Francisco and supplied the LSD consumed at the famous Acid Test parties held by Ken Kesey and his Merry Pranksters, as well as the Human Be-In in San Francisco in January 1967 and the Monterey International Pop Festival in June 1967. He also had close social connections with the Grateful Dead, Jefferson Airplane, and Big Brother and The Holding Company, regularly supplying them with LSD and working as their live sound engineer, creating many tapes of these groups in concert. Owsley's LSD activities—immortalized by Steely Dan in their song "Kid Charlemagne"—ended with his arrest at the end of 1967, but some other manufacturers most likely operated continuously for 30 years or more. Announcing Owsley's first bust in 1966, The San Francisco Chronicle's headline "LSD Millionaire Arrested" inspired the rare Grateful Dead song "Alice D. Millionaire".

Owsley associated with other early LSD producers, Tim Scully and Nicholas Sand.

=== Ken Kesey ===
Ken Kesey was born in 1935 in La Junta, Colorado to dairy farmers Frederick A. Kesey and Ginevra Smith. In 1946, the family moved to Springfield, Oregon. A champion wrestler in both high school and college, he graduated from Springfield High School in 1953.

Kesey attended the University of Oregon's School of Journalism, where he received a degree in speech and communication in 1957, where he was also a brother of Beta Theta Pi. He was awarded a Woodrow Wilson National Fellowship in 1958 to enroll in the creative writing program at Stanford University, which he did the following year. While at Stanford, he studied under Wallace Stegner and began the manuscript that would become One Flew Over the Cuckoo's Nest.

At Stanford in 1959, Kesey volunteered to take part in a CIA-financed study named Project MKULTRA at the Menlo Park Veterans Hospital. The project studied the effects on the patients of hallucinogens and other psychoactive drugs, particularly LSD, psilocybin, mescaline, cocaine, AMT, and DMT. Kesey wrote many detailed accounts of his experiences with these drugs, both during the Project MKULTRA study and in the years of private experimentation that followed. Kesey's role as a medical guinea pig inspired him to write the book One Flew Over the Cuckoo's Nest in 1962. The success of the book, as well as the sale of his residence at Stanford, allowed him to move to La Honda, California in the mountains west of Stanford University. He frequently entertained friends and many others with parties he called "Acid Tests" involving music (such as Kesey's favorite band, The Warlocks, later known as the Grateful Dead), black lights, fluorescent paint, strobes and other "psychedelic" effects, and, of course, LSD. These parties were noted in some of Allen Ginsberg's poems and are also described in the books The Electric Kool-Aid Acid Test by Tom Wolfe, Hell's Angels: The Strange and Terrible Saga of the Outlaw Motorcycle Gangs by Hunter S. Thompson, and Freewheelin Frank, Secretary of the Hell's Angels by Frank Reynolds. Ken Kesey was also said to have experimented with LSD with Ringo Starr in 1965 and that he influenced the setup for future performances with The Beatles in the UK.

In the summer of 1964, Kesey's Merry Pranksters customized a bus named "Furthur" and set out on a tour to propagate LSD use.

=== Sidney Cohen ===
Sidney Cohen was a Los Angeles-based psychiatrist. His work focused on the effects of psychedelics, primarily LSD. Cohen published 13 books in his life, all of them based on drugs and substance abuse. He began working with LSD in the 1950s. One of his earlier works is a video of an experiment that shows Cohen interviewing a woman before and after administering her LSD. In the later part of the 1960s he worked as a director for the National Institute of Mental Health in their Division of Narcotic Addiction and Drug Abuse. He has been open about having taken LSD many times himself, but was always opposed to the growing use of LSD amongst members of the counterculture movement. Cohen thought LSD was safe only if used under medical supervision and that the average person was not equipped with the ability to handle the drug safely. Through his work he had become known as one of the leading experts in LSD research.

=== William Leonard Pickard ===
William Leonard Pickard earned a scholarship to Princeton University but dropped out after one term, instead preferring to hang out at Greenwich Village jazz clubs in New York City. In 1971, he got a job as a research manager at the University of California, Berkeley in the Department of Bacteriology and Immunology, a job he held until 1974.

In December 1988, a neighbor reported a strange chemical odor coming from an architectural shop at a Mountain View, California industrial park. Federal agents arrived to find 200,000 doses of LSD and William Pickard inside. Pickard was charged with manufacturing LSD and served five years in prison.

By 1994, Pickard had enrolled at the John F. Kennedy School of Government at Harvard University. His studies focused on drug abuse in the former Soviet Union, where he theorized that the booming black market and many unemployed chemists could lead to a flood of the drug market.

In 2000, Pickard was arrested for manufacturing LSD in Kansas and was serving two life sentences at United States Penitentiary, Tucson. On July 27, 2020, Pickard was granted Compassionate Release from federal prison after serving 17 years of his sentence.

== Secret government research ==
'Effects of Lysergic Acid Diethylamide (LSD) on Troops Marching' - 16mm film produced by the United States military circa 1958

The U.S. Central Intelligence Agency (CIA) became interested in LSD when they read reports alleging that American prisoners during the Korean War were being brainwashed with the use of some sort of drug or "lie serum". LSD was the original centerpiece of the top secret MKULTRA project, an ambitious undertaking conducted from the 1950s through the 70s designed to explore the possibilities of pharmaceutical mind control. Hundreds of participants, including CIA agents, government employees, military personnel, prostitutes, members of the general public, and mental patients were given LSD, many without their knowledge or consent. The experiments often involved severe psychological torture. To guard against outward reactions, doctors conducted experiments in clinics and laboratories where subjects were monitored by EEG machines and had their words recorded. Some studies investigated whether drugs, stress or specific environmental conditions could be used to break prisoners or to induce confessions.

The CIA also created The Society for the Investigation of Human Ecology, which was a CIA funding front which provided grants to social scientists and medical researchers investigating questions of interest related to the MKULTRA program. Between 1960 and 1963, the CIA gave $856,782 worth of grants to different organizations. The researchers eventually concluded that LSD's effects were too varied and uncontrollable to make it of any practical use as a truth drug, and the project moved on to other substances. It would be decades before the U.S. government admitted the existence of the project and offered apologies to the families of those who were forced to participate in the experiments. During this time period, the use of LSD for psychochemical warfare was under consideration and testing, among other substances. Looking to replicate the effects of nerve gas created by the Germans during World War II without the toxicity, LSD was sought for use under the pretense that it could induce hysteria and psychoses, or at least an inability to fight without wholesale destruction of the enemy and their properties. Thousands of tests on willing research subjects took place at the Edgewood Arsenal in Maryland, with the ultimate conclusion being that LSD was too unpredictable and uncontrollable for any tactical use.

== Recreational use ==
=== From 1960 to 1980 ===
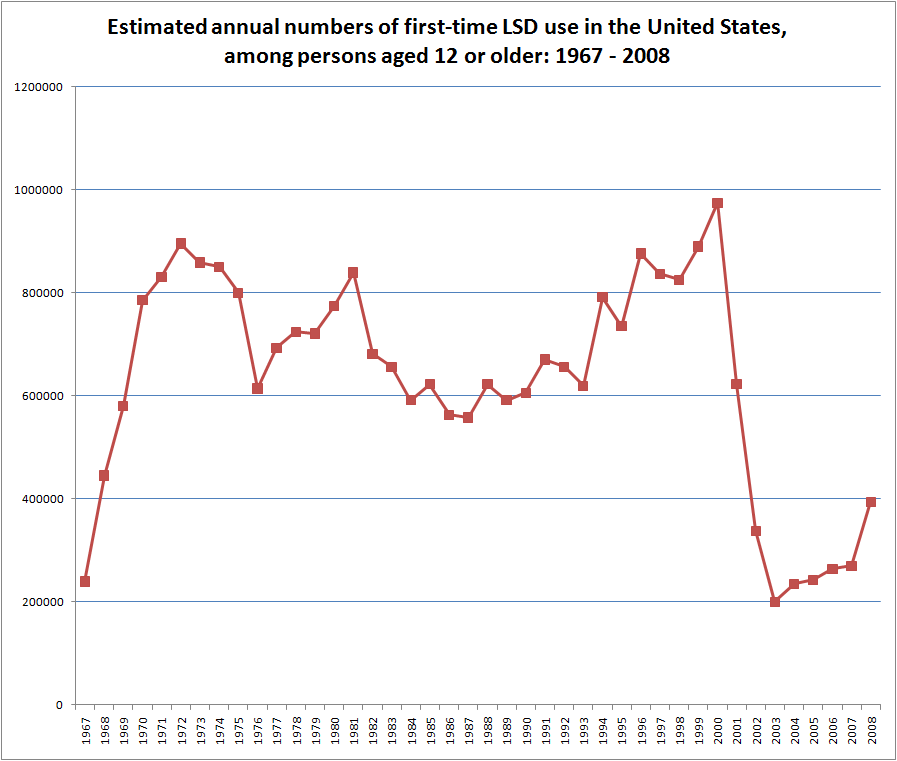
Estimated annual numbers of first-time LSD use in the United States among persons aged 12 or older: 1967–2008

LSD began to be used recreationally in certain (primarily medical) circles. Mainly academics and medical professionals, who became acquainted with LSD in their work, began using it themselves and sharing it with friends and associates. Among the first to do so was British psychiatrist Humphry Osmond.

==== Psychedelic subculture goes mainstream ====
LSD historian Jay Stevens, author of the 1987 book Storming Heaven: LSD and the American Dream, has said that in the early days of its recreational use, LSD users (who were at that time mostly academics and medical professionals) fell into two broadly delineated groups. The first group, which was essentially conservative and exemplified by Aldous Huxley, felt that LSD was too powerful and too dangerous to allow its immediate and widespread introduction, and that its use ought to be restricted to the 'elite' members of society—artists, writers, scientists—who could mediate its gradual distribution throughout society. The second and more radical group, typified by Richard Alpert and Timothy Leary, felt that LSD had the power to revolutionize society and that it should be spread as widely as possible and be available to all.

During the 1960s, this second 'group' of casual LSD users evolved and expanded into a subculture that extolled the mystical and religious symbolism often engendered by the drug's powerful effects, and advocated its use as a method of raising consciousness. The personalities associated with the subculture included spiritual gurus such as Leary and psychedelic rock musicians such as the Grateful Dead, Jimi Hendrix, Pink Floyd, Jefferson Airplane and the Beatles, and soon attracted a great deal of publicity, generating further interest in LSD.

The popularization of LSD outside of the medical world was hastened when individuals such as author Ken Kesey participated in drug trials and liked what they saw. Tom Wolfe wrote a widely read account of the early days of LSD's entrance into the non-academic world in his book The Electric Kool Aid Acid Test, which documented the cross-country, acid-fueled voyage of Kesey and the Merry Pranksters on the psychedelic bus "Furthur" and the Pranksters' later 'Acid Test' LSD parties.

In 1965, Sandoz laboratories stopped its still legal shipments of LSD to the United States for research and psychiatric use, after a request from the U.S. government concerned about its use. By April 1966, LSD use had become so widespread that Time magazine warned about its dangers.

In December 1966, the exploitation film Hallucination Generation was released. This was followed by the films The Trip in 1967 and Psych-Out in 1968.

==== Musicians and LSD ====
On March 27, 1965, Beatles members John Lennon and George Harrison (and their partners) were dosed with LSD without their permission by their dentist, John Riley. Lennon mentioned the incident in his famous 1970 Rolling Stone interview, but the name of the dentist was revealed only in 2006. On August 24, 1965, Lennon, Harrison and Ringo Starr took their second trip on LSD. Actor Peter Fonda repeatedly said "I know what it's like to be dead" to John Lennon during an LSD trip. John Lennon wrote "Lucy in the Sky with Diamonds", a fanciful song which many assumed referred to LSD, although he always denied the connection as coincidence. The songs "She Said She Said" and "Tomorrow Never Knows" from the Beatles' Revolver album explicitly reference LSD trips, and many lines of "Tomorrow Never Knows" were borrowed from Timothy Leary's book The Psychedelic Experience. Around the same time, bands such as Pink Floyd, Jefferson Airplane, and The Grateful Dead helped give birth to a genre known as "psychedelic rock" or acid rock. In 1965, The Pretty Things released an album called Get the Picture? which included a track titled "L.S.D."

LSD became a headline item in early 1967, and the Beatles admitted to having been under the influence of LSD. Earlier in the year, British tabloid News of the World ran a sensational three-week series on "drug parties" hosted by rock group the Moody Blues and attended by leading stars including Donovan, the Who's Pete Townshend and Cream drummer Ginger Baker. Largely as a result of collusion between News of the World journalists and the London Drug Squad, many pop stars including Donovan and Rolling Stones members Mick Jagger and Keith Richards were arrested for drug possession, although none of the arrests involved LSD.

The FBI suggested in now declassified documents that the Grateful Dead were responsible for introducing LSD to the U.S. The Grateful Dead were the "house band" at Ken Kesey and the Merry Pranksters' Acid Tests. These free-form parties introduced many people on the West Coast to LSD for the first time, as documented in Tom Wolfe's The Electric Kool-Aid Acid Test and Phil Lesh's Searching for the Sound. Acid historian Jesse Jarnow describes how Grateful Dead concerts served as the United States' primary distribution network for LSD in the second half of the twentieth century.

In 1992, Mike Dirnt of Green Day wrote the famous "Longview" bass line while under the influence of LSD. In an interview, Green Day lead singer and guitarist Billie Joe Armstrong recalled that he arrived at their house and saw Mike sitting on the floor with highly dilated pupils, holding his bass guitar. Mike looked up at Billie and exclaimed, "Listen to this!"

==== Production of LSD ====
During the 1960s and early 1970s, the drug culture adopted LSD as the psychedelic drug of choice, particularly amongst the hippie community. However, LSD dramatically decreased in popularity in the mid-1970s (see above graph which covers the period 1967–2008). This decline was due to negative publicity centred on side-effects of LSD use, its criminalization, and the increasing effectiveness of drug law enforcement efforts, rather than new medical information. The last country to produce LSD legally (until 1975) was Czechoslovakia; during the 1960s, high-quality LSD was imported from the communist country to California, a fact appreciated by Leary in The Politics of Ecstasy.

Victor James Kapur had the first known home grown UK 'acid lab'. Up to then, all LSD had been imported from the U.S. or was remnant produce of Sandoz before it stopped producing LSD. In 1967, Kapur was caught distributing 19 grams of crystalline LSD and subsequently the police raided both of his laboratories. One was in the back room of Kapur's chemist shop and another, larger one, was in a garage he rented from a friend of his brother-in-law.

A second group was busted in 1969. A lab in Kent, and a flat in London were raided simultaneously and quantities of equipment and LSD seized along with the two men who had been making the LSD, Quentin Theobald and Peter Simmons.

The availability of LSD had been drastically reduced by the late 1970s due to a combination of governmental controls and law enforcement. The supply of constituent chemicals including lysergic acid, which was used for production of LSD in the 1960s, and ergotamine tartrate, which was used for production in the 1970s, were placed under tight surveillance and government funding for LSD research was almost eliminated. These efforts were augmented by a series of major busts in England and Europe. One of the most famous was "Operation Julie" in Britain in 1978, named after the first name of the female drug squad officer involved; it broke up one of the largest LSD manufacturing and distribution operations in the world at that time, headed by chemist Richard Kemp. The group targeted by the Julie task force were reputed to have had links to the mysterious The Brotherhood of Eternal Love and to Ronald Stark.

=== Modern times ===
LSD made a comeback in the 1980s accompanying the advent of recreational MDMA use, first in the punk and gothic subcultures through dance clubs, then in the 1990s through the acid house scene and rave subculture. LSD use and availability declined sharply following a raid of a large scale LSD lab in 2000 (see LSD in the United States). The lab was run by William Leonard Pickard (who served 17 years of a two lifetime sentence in US federal prison in Tucson, AZ) and Clyde Apperson (now serving 30 years in prison). Gordon Todd Skinner, who owned the property the large scale lab had been operating on, came to the DEA looking to work as an informant. He and his then-girlfriend Krystle Cole were intimately involved in the case, but were not charged in the bust. The lab was allegedly producing a kilogram of LSD every five weeks, and the U.S. government contends that LSD supply dropped by 90% following the bust. In the decade after the bust, LSD availability and use has gradually risen. Since the late 1980s, there has also been a revival of hallucinogen research more broadly, which, in recent years, has included preclinical and clinical studies involving LSD and other compounds such as members of the 2C family compounds and psilocybin. In particular, a study released in 2012 highlighted the extraordinary effectiveness of LSD in treating alcoholism.

In November 2015, Rolling Stone magazine reported on an increasing number of young professionals, particularly in the San Francisco area, who were using "microdosing" (around 10 micrograms) of LSD in an effort to "work through technical problems and become more innovative." In 2018, the book How to Change Your Mind: What the New Science of Psychedelics Teaches Us About Consciousness, Dying, Addiction, Depression, and Transcendence by Michael Pollan became a No. 1 New York Times best-seller, and How to Change Your Mind, a four-part documentary film adaptation of the book, was released in 2022. In 2020, Oregon became the first U.S. state to decriminalize possession of small amounts of LSD.

== See also ==
- Casey William Hardison
- Counterculture of the 1960s
- Urban legends about LSD
- LSD art
- Psychedelic therapy
- Psychonautics
- The Sunshine Makers
