= League for Spiritual Discovery =

1960s spiritual society advocating for the legalization of LSD

The official seal of the League for Spiritual Discovery, "a mandala - the end-less circle circumscribing a four-leaf lotus made by the double infinity sign."

League for Spiritual Discovery (LSD) was a spiritual organization inspired by the works of Timothy Leary, and strove for legal use of lysergic acid diethylamide (LSD) for the purpose of meditation, insight, and spiritual understanding. It was in existence during the mid-to-late 1960s, and eventually closed by Leary. The New York Center for the League of Spiritual Discovery, in existence for around a year, was co-founded by Timothy Leary and Nina Graboi in 1966. The center was the first LSD-based meditation center in Manhattan.

== Origins ==
Timothy Leary and Richard Alpert were psychedelic researchers at Harvard University in the Psychology Department during the early 1960s. In 1962 Leary set up a grassroots nonprofit group with Alpert (later known as Ram Dass) called the International Federation for Internal Freedom (IFIF), in order to carry out studies in the religious use of psychedelic drugs. IFIF was subsequently disbanded and renamed the Castalia Foundation (after the intellectual colony in Herman Hesse's The Glass Bead Game), when Leary and Alpert set up a communal group in 1963 at the Hitchcock Estate in Millbrook, New York. Leary and Alpert lived and worked at the Millbrook estate with a small group devoted to the exploration of consciousness-expanding drugs. The group's journal was the Psychedelic Review.

The Castalia Foundation hosted weekend retreats on the estate where people paid to undergo the psychedelic experience without drugs, through meditation, yoga, and group therapy sessions. The Castalia Foundation adopted some of the mystic teachings of Gurdjieff for their non-drug workshops. During 1965 Castalia Foundation members collaborated with artists, including the media art collective USCO (The Company of US), to reproduce the LSD experience in improvised audio-visual psychedelic shows in Manhattan.

The origins of the League for Spiritual Discovery can also be found in the Original Kleptonian Neo-American Church, whose clergy members administered sacraments in the form of psychedelic drugs. The church was founded in 1965 by Arthur Kleps, a participant in Leary's circle at Millbrook. The Millbrook residents were a tight-knit group whose goal was to discover and cultivate the divinity within each person, and they regularly took high doses of LSD in group sessions.

Leary was arrested in December 1965 for possession of marijuana.

== History ==
On September 19, 1966, Leary reorganized the IFIF/Castalia Foundation under the nomenclature of the League for Spiritual Discovery, a religion with LSD as its holy sacrament. By doing this, he hoped to legalize LSD based on a "freedom of religion" argument. They were influenced by the Native American Church's historical peyote use. The League for Spiritual Discovery was incorporated by Leary as a religious organization in New York State. Leary's goal was to create a new concept of religion based on his communal experiences at Millbrook, in which people with shared spiritual goals came together to expand consciousness. The organization was also referred to as the League of Spiritual Discovery. Anyone at Millbrook could read publications such as Leary's Psychedelic Prayers (a book of poems inspired by the Tao Te Ching meant to be used as an aid to LSD trips), and underground newspapers to which the group subscribed.

The League for Spiritual Discovery's belief structure was based on Leary's mantra: "drop out, turn on, tune in." Though the more popular "turn on, tune in, drop out" became synonymous with Leary, his actual definition was: "Drop Out – detach yourself from the external social drama which is as dehydrated and ersatz as TV. Turn On – find a sacrament which returns you to the temple of God, your own body. Go out of your mind. Get high. Tune In – be reborn. Drop back in to express it. Start a new sequence of behavior that reflects your vision." Although The Brotherhood of Eternal Love would subsequently consider Leary their spiritual leader, The Brotherhood did not evolve out of the League for Spiritual Discovery. The motto of the group, "Turn on, tune in, drop out" became synonymous with the sixties.

Nicholas Sand, the clandestine chemist for the Brotherhood of Eternal Love, followed Leary to Millbrook and joined the League for Spiritual Discovery. Sand was designated the "alchemist" of the new religion. Owsley Stanley encouraged Sand to shift his operations to California, and offered him the services of his lab partner, Tim Scully. There Sand and Scully manufactured Orange Sunshine LSD - their history is documented in the documentary The Sunshine Makers.

On October 6, 1966, LSD was made illegal in the state of California. Later, on October 24, 1968, LSD was added to the list of Schedule 1 substances, which made it illegal to possess, manufacture, or use for any purpose in the United States.

At the end of 1966, Nina Graboi, a friend and colleague of Leary's who had spent time with him at Millbrook, became the director of the Center for the League of Spiritual Discovery in Greenwich Village. The Center opened in March 1967. Graboi explained "The League of Spiritual Discovery had only two commandments: Thou shalt not alter the consciousness of thy fellow man, and Thou shalt not prevent thy fellow man from altering his own consciousness." Graboi accepted the position as director to disseminate information about the use and misuse of psychedelics, in order to minimize their ill effects. Leary thought their work together could educate people about the constructive use of LSD, as well as serve as a rescue center. Leary and Alpert gave free weekly talks at the center, and other guest speakers included Ralph Metzner and Allen Ginsberg.

During late 1966 and early 1967, Leary toured college campuses to spread the psychedelic gospel by presenting a multi-media performance called "The Death of the Mind" which attempted to artistically replicate the LSD experience. It had initially opened at a theater that became the location for the Fillmore East. Leary said the League for Spiritual Discovery was limited to 360 members and was already at its membership limit, but he encouraged others to form their own psychedelic religions. He published a pamphlet in 1967 called Start Your Own Religion to encourage people to do so.

At the end of 1967, Leary was evicted from the Millbrook estate, and shortly thereafter moved to Laguna Beach, California after Rosemary Leary became his third wife. He was arrested on December 26, 1968 in Laguna Beach for possession of marijuana. In 1970, Leary received a ten-year sentence for the marijuana arrest. He escaped from prison with help from the Weather Underground and Black Panthers, but was arrested again in 1973. He was released from prison in 1976.

Around end of 1967/early 1968 the League for Spiritual Discovery was closed down, and the New York Center for the League of Spiritual Discovery was abandoned shortly after Graboi left her position as director.

Leary's papers at the New York Public Library include complete records of the International Federation for Internal Freedom, the Castalia Foundation, and the League for Spiritual Discovery.

== Revival ==
In October 2006, the League for Spiritual Discovery was restarted, taking all of the original intents of the prior organization as a foundation, but updating the message and expanding the work.

== See also ==
- Ayahuasca
- Bwiti
- Entheogen
- God in a Pill?
- Ibogaine
- List of psychedelic drugs
- List of psychoactive plants
- Mystical psychosis
- Peyote
- Psilocybin mushroom
- Psychedelic experience
- Psychedelic psychotherapy
- Tabernanthe iboga
