= Gordon Todd Skinner =

American drug manufacturer and dealer

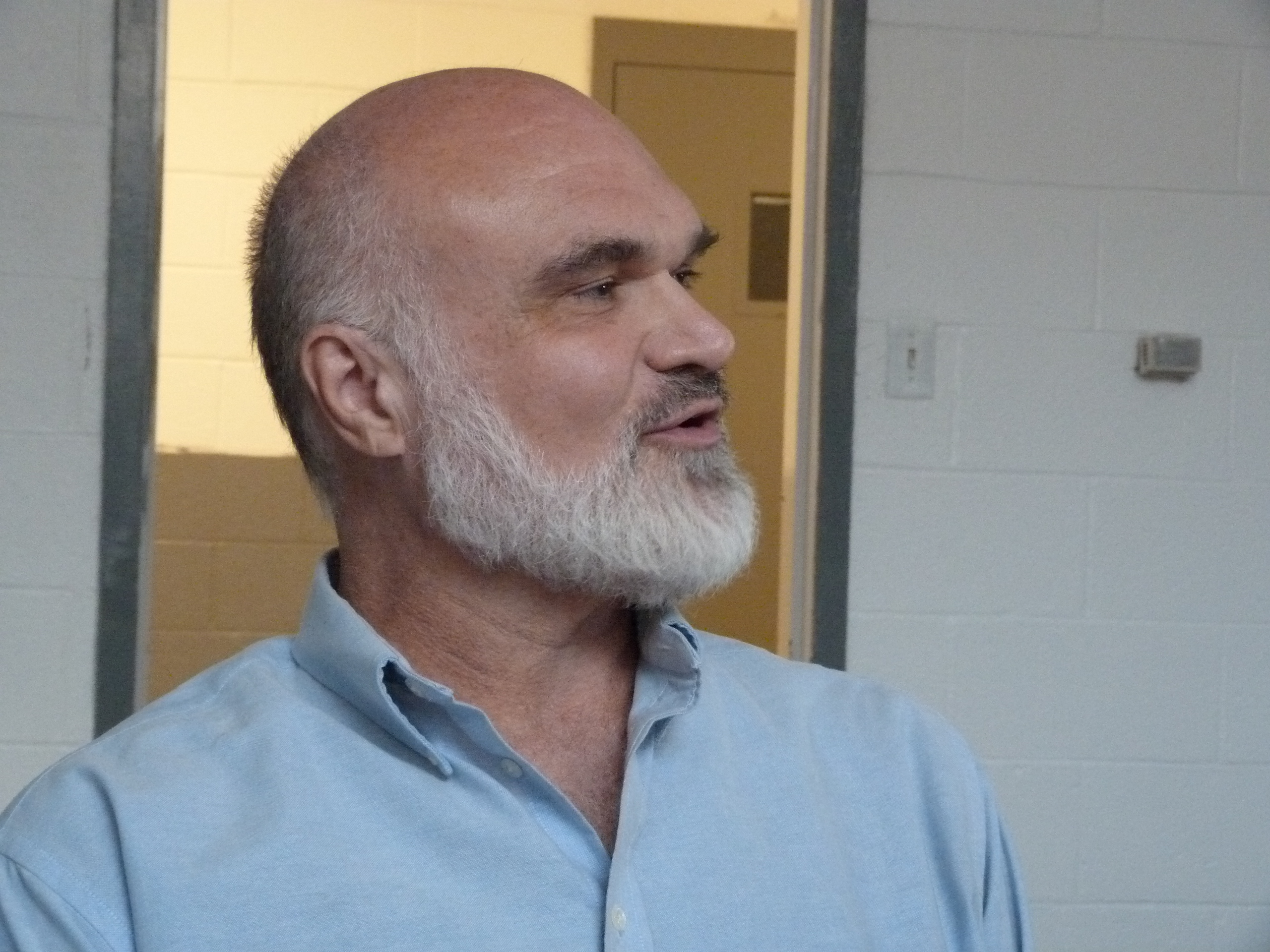
- Skinner in 2024
- Born: July 13, 1964 (age 62)
- Known for: Drug manufacturing and dealing
- Criminal charges: Kidnapping, rape, assault with a dangerous weapon, and conspiracy to kidnap
- Criminal penalty: Sentenced to life plus 90 years
- Criminal status: Convicted

Gordon Todd Skinner (born July 13, 1964) is an American criminal who was involved in the world's largest LSD dealing operation in the late 1990s and 2000. He worked with chemist William Leonard Pickard and their mover, Clyde Apperson, to manufacture and distribute LSD in and from Aspen, Colorado; Sante Fe, New Mexico; and two former missile silos in Salina and Wamego, Kansas.

Skinner grew up in Tulsa, Oklahoma. In high school, he manufactured and dealt drugs like synthetic mescaline, despite his stepfather's employment by federal drug enforcement agencies—which had agents working in Skinner's house. In the 1980s, Skinner became an informant for such agencies. He once worked with the ONDCP on a sting operation that led to dealer José Abello Silva's arrest, which, in turn, led to the fall of the Colombian Medellín Cartel.

Skinner, Pickard, and Apperson then made tens of millions of dollars off their LSD operation. Skinner then grew paranoid about an imaginary murder that Pickard had committed, and in 2000, informed the DEA of the operation. This gave him absolute immunity from prosecution. On November 6, 2000, the DEA raided the Wamego silo as part of their investigation Operation White Rabbit. The raid allegedly caused a 95% decline in worldwide LSD availability by 2004.

Pickard and Apperson were sentenced to prison, while Skinner continued dealing drugs. In July 2003, he kidnapped and tortured his drug dealing apprentice, Brandon Green, in a hotel in Tulsa. Skinner was convicted, and given a sentence of life imprisonment plus 90 years.

== Early life ==
Gordon Todd Skinner, who was known by his friends as Todd, grew up in Tulsa, Oklahoma. His biological father was Gordon H. Skinner, a chiropractor. Skinner's mother was a businesswoman named Katherine Magrini, who ran a spring manufacturer, Gardner Springs Company and a candy company, Katherine's Spring Gourmet Chocolates. She divorced Gordon H. Skinner after she caught him molesting a child for the second time, and then married William Inholf for 18 months. Afterwards, she married Gary Lee Magrini, who was a special criminal agent with the Department of the Treasury (which performed drug investigations at the time), as well the Internal Revenue Service's (IRS) Criminal Enforcement Agency and the Northern District of Oklahoma's Organized Crime Drug Enforcement Task Force.

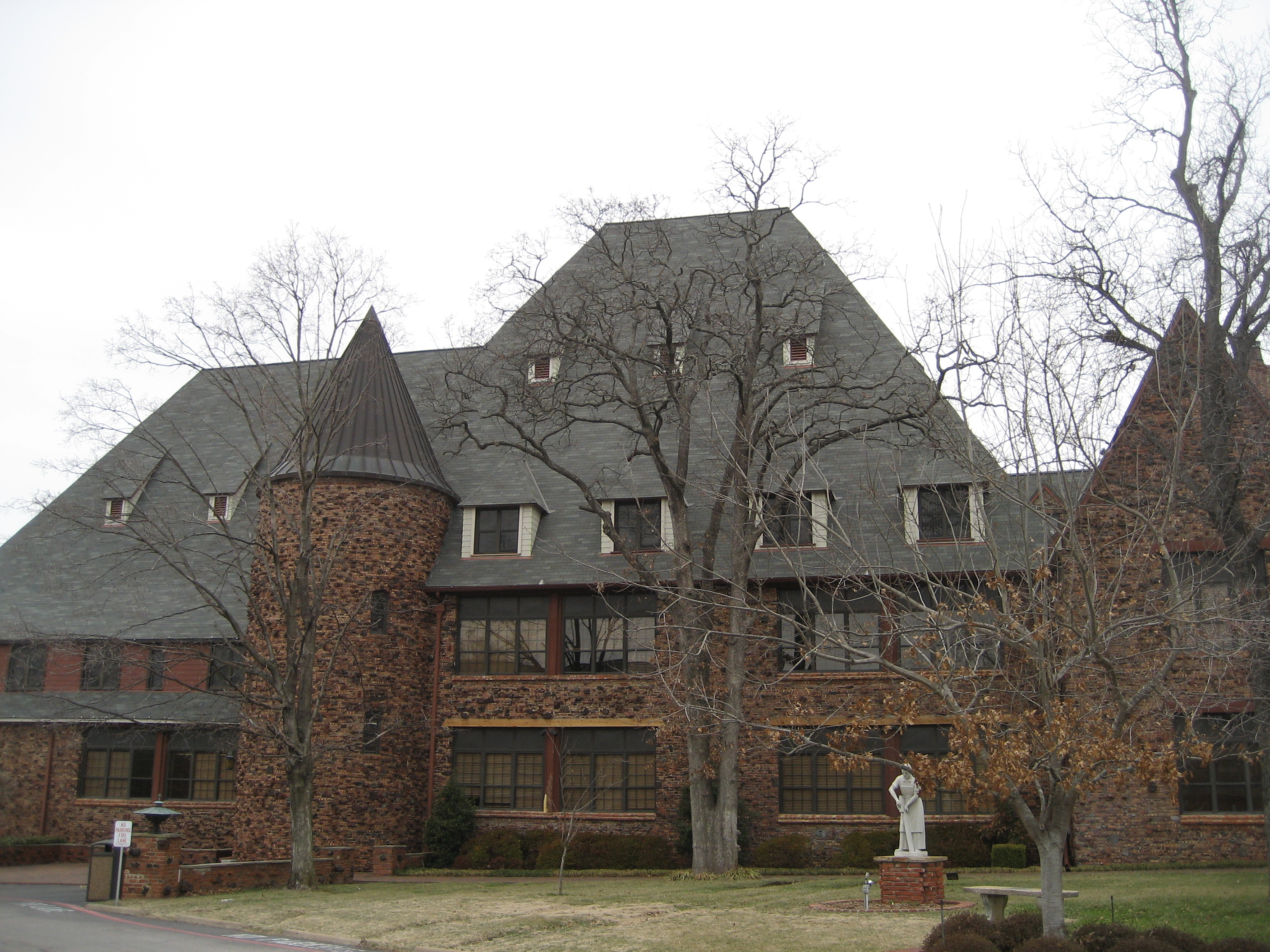
Cascia Hall Preparatory School in Tulsa, where Skinner went to high school and started dealing drugs

Skinner went to Cascia Hall Preparatory School, a Catholic private school. He was good at math and chemistry, and in the latter, he had a great understanding of molecular structures. At age 15, Skinner started being obsessed with drugs. At 16, he started extracting psychedelic tryptamines from plants and gave them to his friends and classmates, studying their reactions. He often brought a tank of nitrous oxide to school, which he and his friends inhaled from. He also bought many books on drugs. Though federal agents (of the Customs and Border Protection, Drug Enforcement Administration (DEA), Federal Bureau of Investigation (FBI), and IRS) frequently visited his home to meet with his stepfather, they either "didn't notice or didn't care" that Skinner was making drugs. His friend's father caught the two [Skinner and his friend] synthesizing DMT in Skinner's basement, and the father warned them that the practice was dangerous.

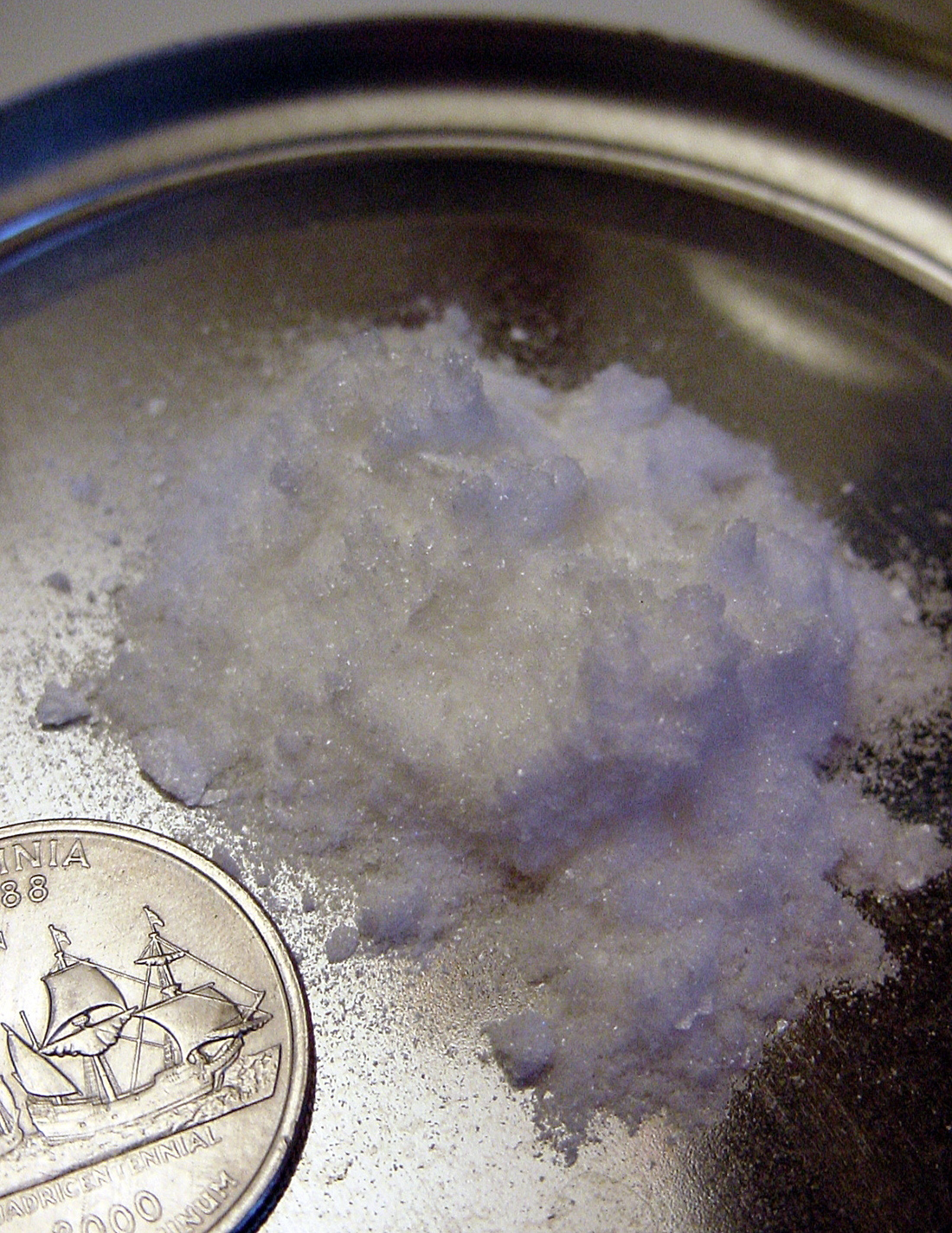
A pile of synthetic mescaline (a U.S. quarter for scale)

At age 19, Skinner acquired 10,000 peyote buttons from a Native American-owned church in Laredo, Texas, and stored them in the trunk of his car. He extracted alkaloid from them, to synthesize mescaline to sell to the Navajo Nation (who have a history of using mescaline synthesized from peyote). He wanted to sample it before selling, and got more into drug use after doing so. According to testimony Skinner later gave in court, he tried over 163 types of drugs in his life. Some of them were entheogens, which he took irregularly because they were "very spiritual" things to him. When he did, his method of ingesting them was "The Eucharist", a communion wafer tainted with lysergamide chemical compounds like ALD-52; extract from morning glory seeds; and ergot wine. He ingested the wafer with his friends in special ceremonies involving a sacrament, and Skinner's friends often referred to him as "the Buddha". After graduating high school in 1982, he studied at the Schiller International University in Germany, but failed his first semester. He then returned to Oklahoma and worked at Gardner Springs Company.

== Government informant career ==
In spring 1984, Skinner became a government informant by calling the Tulsa FBI field office. He told the agent who responded that he had made a deal with a con artist in Texas, Sam Merit; he told Merit he was the heir to Gardner Springs Company, and offered to loan Merit $300,000 to invest in a Caribbean charter airline and build a fake gold mine in Arizona. The FBI found Skinner's tip to be true, and Merit eventually fled to South Africa after he and five co-conspirators were indicted for a penny stock fraud.

=== José Abello Silva operation ===
Skinner spent the mid-80s between Hot Springs and Little Rock, Arkansas, as well as Tucson, Arizona, while working as an informant for the U.S. Department of Justice. Skinner was arrested twice for selling marijuana, in an area of Mexico near the border town of Sells, Arizona, and in Boston. He had helped minimize the fallout of those arrests by contributing to the downfall of the Colombian Medellín drug cartel. He had befriended a Colombian cocaine dealer named Boris Olarte, who had purchased a business from Skinner's mother, a custom chocolate brand named Okie Power. After purchasing this, Olarte had been arrested and put in a Tulsa County jail. Skinner used Magrini's connections to convince the DEA to put Olarte in witness protection, and use him against the cartel. Olarte worked with the Office of National Drug Control Policy in a sting operation which led to the arrest of Olarte's supplier, José Abello Silva, a major Medellín dealer. Olarte's wife, Clara Lacle (who lived with Magrini), flew to Aruba with FBI agents to set up Silva. His arrest in 1989 led to the downfall of the cartel. Skinner used his time as an informant to gather intelligence on how the government investigates drugs.

=== New Jersey operation ===
On January 26, 1989, Skinner was arrested in Camden, New Jersey for trafficking 42 pounds of marijuana with a friend. They were caught by undercover cops, and Skinner's bail was set at $1 million. Skinner spent a year in the state waiting for trial. His father convinced him to make a deal with authorities. In jail, Skinner had met John Worthy, who said he had 50 pounds (22.6 kg) of marijuana he was going to sell. Skinner went to the district attorney and made a deal, which reduced his bail to half a million. He returned to Tulsa, where he recorded his phone calls with Worthy. On the call, Skinner agreed to meet with him at a hotel in Vineland. Skinner sold 30 pounds of marijuana to Worthy, his wife Willie Mae, and partner Lamont Briscoe. He was wearing a wire, and was eavesdropped by the New Jersey Narcotics Strike Force. Worthy was arrested at the hotel, and a day later, Skinner pleaded guilty to one reduced count of conspiracy, and was given a three-year probation. The probation was terminated after 2 years. In 1995, Skinner's wiretaps and testimony were thrown out; the New Jersey Supreme Court found the "credibility and character of Skinner was... questionable". While in jail, he met fellow inmate William Ernest Hauck, who was jailed for a sex offense. In the 1990s, Hauck would be a truck driver for Katherine's company, and worked with Skinner on his LSD distribution operation.

=== Caribbean operations ===
His next case in 1989 was against brothers John and Horace Morgan in Montego Bay, Jamaica. The Morgans controlled multiple gas stations, a hotel, car rental, and the Fairfield Plantation Resort. The DEA claimed they led the local drug market for marijuana (including hashish) and cocaine. The plan was for him to convince John Morgan to meet Skinner in the Cayman Islands, where Skinner would sell him a boat full of marijuana, and Morgan would be arrested in Georgetown. On December 7, Skinner flew to Grand Cayman, and set up the sting operation with Gloucester County detectives and an agent from the DEA Miami field office. On February 20, 1990, Skinner flew to Jamaica, and using a series of aliases, he leased a 78-foot oil field utility boat. A hurricane wrecked the tanker, which he failed to insure, off the coast of Jamaica. The marijuana shipment was ruined. Cayman Islands customs officials boarded the boat and gave him one hour to leave the country. Skinner's friend, Joe Seligman, ended up paying for some part of the $80,000 in unpaid lease bills.

While in Jamaica, Skinner met Everett LaVay McKinley, a preacher from South Dakota who set up the World Fidelity Bank in Grenada. The bank promised a 48% return on investment, and 212 church members gave McKinley $5.5 million to invest, which was never returned to them—an act of securities fraud. McKinley tried to involve Skinner in the scam, and Skinner testified to authorities about it. McKinley was sentenced to 27 years.

== 1980s and 1990s personal life ==
As Skinner was informing the government about fraudsters, he was committing fraud himself. He opened an account with a Philadelphia brokerage house that specialized in foreign currency options, again claiming he was an heir to his mother's fortune. He claimed to Tulsa World that he sat on the Philadelphia Stock Exchange, and managed a currency trading company called FINIX. When his margins were called six months later, it was found he owed over $1.5 million. In 1992, a jury found Skinner and his mother guilty of bankruptcy fraud, regarding his scheme in Philadelphia. The defendants were awarded $1.15 million, and Skinner's mother paid $100,000. This led to Skinner filing for Chapter 7 bankruptcy in Tulsa in 1992. That year, he also became addicted to prescription painkillers, and married Oklahoma State University medical student Kelly Sue Rothe. They had a daughter and a son.

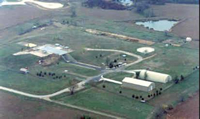
Skinner's missile silo in Wamego, Kansas, used for drug manufacturing and distribution

In July 1996, Skinner bought a decommissioned U.S. Air Force Atlas-E missile silo in Wamego, Kansas. He bought it for $40,000 with a trust he created, the Wamego Land Trust, on which he installed his junior high school science teacher, Graham Kendall, as trustee. The idea was to use it as a manufacturing facility for Gardner Springs Company. Several locals went on an employee payroll for the facility.

It was a 28-acre plot with 15,000 feet of underground storage space. He renovated the space, instead using the underground for "hardcore" drug parties. Renovation amounted to $300,000, which included a $100,000+ stereo system. The above-ground was used for letting animals roam. The security of the silo included a camera monitoring system, motion detectors, and infrared sensors. Off-duty security officers were hired. The silo became a point of gossip locally, which partially led to Rothe divorcing Skinner; another reason was that Skinner would dope his children during long trips rather than listen to them complaining. She fought for custody the next few years. A few local officials guessed the property was used as a meth lab. The local sheriff called the DEA, but nothing came of this. In 1998, Skinner and Magrini had a falling out, and she ordered all of the Gardner Springs "machinery, materials, and employees" be removed from the complex. This hurt Skinner's financial situation. In April 1999, a friend of Skinner's, and a Tulsa computer company employee, Paul K. Hulebak, overdosed on methadone and hydromorphone and died in the silo. Skinner also moved into a house in Stinson Beach, California, which was a used as a partying spot for the entheogen community. The musician Sting attended one of the parties.

In the summer of 1997, Skinner dosed his children's babysitter with blotter acid, a method of taking LSD. When she brought the incident to the police, they wrote the report was "not credible". On October 21, 1997, while Skinner was driving in Oklahoma, a State Trooper pulled him over for reckless driving, and found him to be driving under the influence. Skinner's driver's license had his name as "Gerard Terrence Finnegan". Under this name, he appeared in court on December 22, and paid fines of $1,140 in cash. Suspicion was not raised the entire time.

Skinner would eventually form two relationships. In 1997, he started dating a woman named Emily Regan, who taught chemistry at the University of Tulsa. In February 2000, Skinner met Krystle Anne Cole, a stripper at a Topeka strip club. Skinner later convinced Cole to join him at the Wamego silo and become his personal assistant in making LSD. Cole said that he initially claimed the silo was part of his preparations for Y2K. The two tripped on LSD and MDMA (or "ecstasy") together. In September 2000, Skinner married Regan, had one daughter together, and then divorced in 2001. Afterwards, Skinner formed a deep relationship with Cole; he initiated her into a Christian-esque religious order, and said "we worshipped each other as divine interlocking pieces of God."

== LSD manufacturing and distribution ==
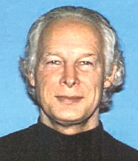
William Leonard Pickard, a drug chemist who worked with Skinner in LSD manufacturing

In the 1990s, Skinner asked his friend in the entheogen community, Alfred Savinelli, where to find William Leonard Pickard, an "elusive" chemist known as the "Acid King", who had gone to prison twice (once for drug manufacturing, and the other for manufacturing and drug possession), and was advancing the field of LSD chemistry. He was one of ten chemists in the world who distributed LSD. Savinelli knew Pickard, but thought the two would not work well together, and did not let them make contact. Pickard was involved in hallucinogenic circles, and studied public policy at Harvard University, where he earned a master's degree.

Skinner and Pickard met in the mid-1990s; Skinner testified they met at a 1996 shamanic botany conference, while Pickard said they met at a 1998 session of the American Academy of Forensic Sciences. Either way, Skinner lied to Pickard about potentially receiving money from billionaire Warren Buffett, which Pickard hoped would fund more drug research at Harvard. By this time, Skinner was using drugs often, including ayahuasca. The two met often at his Stinson Beach home.

=== Starting the LSD operation ===
==== Aspen, Colorado ====
In the mid-90s, the LSD community suffered serious setbacks, with the death of Tim Leary, and the arrests of chemists Nick Sand, Bruce Michael Young, David Roy Shepard, as well as Shepard's five co-conspirators. It was in this context that Pickard started a moveable chemical processing facility at a house in Aspen, Colorado, which Skinner was involved in. Pickard told Skinner that he had bought the lab with high-stakes poker money. Skinner heard from his contacts in the drug community that he bought it with $200,000 he made from selling 66 grams of LSD, made in researcher Dave Nichols' lab under the pretense of doing research. Skinner said the rent was $15,000 a month, which Pickard said was a lie. Skinner and Pickard left Aspen in late 1998 or early 1999 due to high rent, chemical spills, and the house being in disrepair (which required the visitation of carpenters and plumbers).

==== Santa Fe, New Mexico ====
They moved the business to Santa Fe, New Mexico, where Pickard had purchased a lab area from a local contractor under the pretense of it being a writer's retreat. Pickard said he was able to afford his recent location changes (Santa Fe, as well as Cambridge and Moscow) with loans from Skinner. The lab's LSD output made them $30 million in revenue within a year. Skinner was not at the facility enough to know the total volume of what they produced; his job was to manage the cash flow coming from Al "Petaluma Al" Reid, a man from California who Pickard sold the acid to. Skinner said he and Pickard were moving so much cash, they did not account for transactions below $30,000, and refused to keep any bills less than $20 on the grounds, saying the cash took up too much space. Skinner once stole $70,000 from Pickard; Pickard noticed $50,000 had gone missing and confronted him. Skinner denied he took it, and ultimately kept it. Skinner also claimed he kept a group of lower-level staff who would exchange the money at casinos and other places, and that he unloaded large volumes of Dutch guilders into the Las Vegas market at a time when the guilder was depreciating. After two years, to avoid suspicion, Skinner, Pickard, and their mover Clyde Apperson, stopped the New Mexico operation and went prospecting for a new location in Kansas.

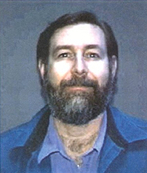
Skinner and Pickard's mover, Clyde Apperson

==== Salina and Wamego, Kansas ====
For their new location, they could not use Skinner's Atlas-E silo because his name was attached to the property, which was bad for a potential investigation. By this time, the government was keeping tabs on Skinner and the silo. They found an Atlas-F missile silo in Salina, a short drive away from the Wamego silo. The two locations differed in design, in that Atlas-E were stored horizontally and Atlas-F missiles were stored vertically. The features of the new location "made government intrusion nearly impossible"; the structure was harder to break into, and was surrounded by more space and a military fence. Skinner said later that "you would be able to tell if you were under surveillance." Tim Schwartz, the property's owner, sold it to Skinner, making an informal agreement that Skinner could use it while Schwartz was traveling the country. According to Skinner, himself, Pickard, and Apperson started the new operation around December 1999, and Cole would be involved. In March 2000, Tim Schwartz committed suicide. In July, Schwartz' father contacted Skinner, telling him to move out of the silo. Pickard and Apperson were away at the time, so Skinner gathered a few friends to move the entire lab to the Wamego silo. Skinner claims his biological father also helped him. Skinner feared Pickard and Apperson would be angry, and he lied to them about moving the operation to a lab in Topeka, but they eventually learned of the Wamego operation.

=== Skinner informs on Pickard ===
Around 2000, Skinner was questioning Pickard's integrity, suspecting that he was involved in the murder of an informant. In August, he told Cole he would inform on Pickard. Later, Skinner met with Pickard in California, and said he was planning to marry Regan and would return the lab equipment after. He went to the government, and in September 2000, the DEA started investigating Pickard in "Operation White Rabbit". He signed the DEA's Confidential Source Agreement form, which gave him some level of immunity. He still did not feel safe, and on October 19, he made a deal with the Justice Department's Narcotics and Dangerous Drug Section that no statements he made during the investigation would be used against him in any criminal case. During the investigation, he took DEA agents into the Wamego silo under the guise of a property tour, and recorded phone calls he made with Pickard.

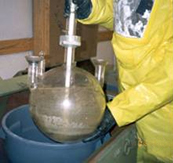
Glassware being seized from the Wamego silo

On November 6, the DEA seized 215 pounds of lysergic acid, 52 pounds of iso-LSD, and 42 pounds of ergocristine, and potentially 91 pounds of a substance containing some amount of LSD. They also had possibly produced LSZ. Later testimony suggested the amount of LSD at the site was seven ounces; if there was a larger stockpile of LSD elsewhere, the DEA never found it. On November 6 or 7, Apperson pulled out of the Wamego silo property in his truck, which contained LSD lab equipment from the Salina silo, along with precursor. Pickard trailed Apperson. Kansas Highway Patrol eventually pulled both of them over, and Pickard took off running into a field. He was then found by a farmer and arrested the next day. Skinner was later told by federal agents that the informant Skinner had been worried about had not been killed.

=== Pickard and Apperson's trial ===
The trial was 11 weeks. He testified in front of a jury on January 28, 2003. The testimony's transcript was compiled in a 706-page document. He said that he confessed for reasons relating to his Catholic upbringing, that Pickard had violated an "organization of spiritual means", and that "the deeper I looked into this organization, the more corrupt I found it to be" ... "even the corruption was on my self." Pickard denied Skinner's story, saying the Santa Fe operation never existed the way Skinner told it, and that it was used by Skinner to manufacture ayahuasca. He said he had "incidental" contact with Skinner until late 1999, and afterwards had "perhaps a dinner a month" with him. Witness testimonies were inconsistent with his story. Savinelli, who provided the operation's lab equipment, said Pickard made him worry for him and his family's safety. He received a note that he perceived was a death threat, guessing it had come from or through Pickard. A man named David Haley said Pickard paid him $300,000 to lease the house in Santa Fe for two years. DEA agent Karl Nichols showcased suspicious phone records and financial transactions of Pickard's.

During the trial, Skinner flipped back to supporting Pickard and Apperson. According to Lead Assistant U.S. Attorney Gregory Hough, Skinner created a group of "mini-trials" by testifying that three DEA agents, a courtroom deputy, and Hough had conspired to effect his testimony. Hough then instructed the DEA to no longer have any contact with Skinner. Hough later said it was a "great distraction" that breached Skinner's immunity agreement. Karl Nichols sent a memo within the DEA that said Skinner would never be used as a confidential informant again.

On March 23, Pickard and Apperson were found guilty of conspiring to manufacture, distribute, and dispense LSD. In November, Pickard was sentenced to two life sentences in prison without the possibility of parole, and Apperson was sentenced to 30 years.

=== Aftermath ===
Pickard and Apperson's convictions caused the entheogen community, which was "just gaining ground with legitimate research and studies", to fall apart. According to Savinelli, "everybody dug in deep and disappeared and sought protection". In 2005, Pickard filed an affidavit with the U.S. Court of Appeals, saying that Skinner owned the Wamego lab equipment, was the chemist at Wamego, and planned to set up Pickard as the party responsible. In 2013, Pickard and Apperson lost a bid to receive a 300-page "confidential informant file" on them. In 2017, Pickard lost a bid to receive information on Skinner. In July 2020, he was released on compassionate grounds.

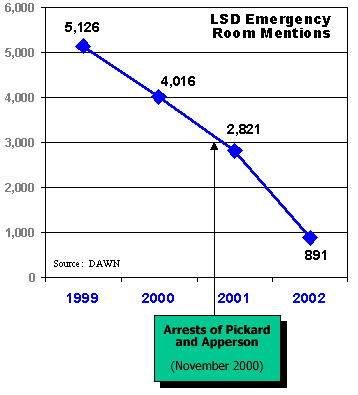
A graph created by the DEA in 2003, showing emergency room mentions of LSD from 1999 to 2002, and the increased decline after Pickard and Apperson's arrests

The DEA showed in 2003 that arrests for LSD possession and mentions of LSD in emergency rooms increased in decline after Pickard and Apperson's arrests. DEA Administrator Karen P. Tandy stated in 2004 that Pickard's organization was the world's largest LSD manufacturing organization, that the seizure of property from the Wamego silo was the largest seizure of an operable LSD lab in history, and that since the seizure, worldwide LSD availability declined by 95 percent. There was some debate over how much LSD the operation actually made. Multiple media organizations reported that the operation made 91 pounds of LSD, a number which was given by Tandy. It was later revealed that those 91 pounds only contained a partial amount of LSD; in 2003, DEA forensic chemist McKibben said the amount of acid actually totaled seven ounces. In 2005, John P. Walters of the ONDCP testified before Congress, saying that Pickard's operation had enough material to make 25 million doses of LSD. Ryan Grim, writing for Slate, believed Walters' number could be an underestimation, saying that if 91 pounds of LSD were actually produced, "[even] at 50 micrograms a hit, that’s only 1.25 kilograms, still about 88 pounds short of 91 [pounds]."

In 2006, the owner of Wamego silo said somebody broke in and reclaimed something from one of the bathroom tiles.

== Relation to Brandon Green ==
=== Background ===
Skinner said he was in a good mood in early 2003, and planned to leave the U.S., but eventually became "disheveled and unkempt", having lost weight and sleep over his falling out with Pickard, and his presence to investigating authorities. Around the same time, Cole was dating an 18-year-old drug dealer from Broken Arrow, Oklahoma, named Brandon Andres Green. The two met in April. When Green met Skinner later, Skinner asked him if he was interested in a drug operation in Amsterdam that involved a kilo of LSD. Cole and Skinner then started mentoring him on drug dealing.

Skinner became more bothered by Cole and Green's relationship over the following months; they eventually escaped from Skinner, because they feared him. One night he broke into their collective apartment when only Cole was home. He forced her into his car, and then sped away. Cole said he had threatened to drive off a bridge. Cole and Green requested a restraining order against Skinner on June 9, but they canceled the idea when Skinner agreed to pay them off in MDMA pills. They then told the DEA that Skinner had an MDMA lab at his mother's company in Tulsa, and that Green had dealt for him. They traveled to Las Vegas, where they devised a plan to leave the country together. They ultimately decided against it, considering their poor financial situation. Later, Cole asked Green to go to a grocery store. When Green returned, she was gone, leaving a note saying she had left for California to get false passports from the Brotherhood of Eternal Love. In actuality, she returned to Tulsa to resume her relationship with Skinner, because he had plenty of money and drugs. She then married Skinner. In 2006, Cole claimed she had spoken to DEA agents at some point in her past, and guessed it was after the Las Vegas trip. She said that Skinner had been keeping her drugged, threatened her into marrying him. She and Green left for Las Vegas, she said, because Skinner was aware that the two had been talked to, and had threatened to report them to the DEA.

Green drove back to Oklahoma, where he returned to his apartment and found Skinner. Skinner thanked Green for taking care of Cole, and said the three of them would be escaping the country, floating an idea of dredging harbors in the Caribbean. Green thought that he could use the opportunity in the Caribbean to ditch Skinner with Cole. He tried to contact Cole over the phone with the idea, but she did not return his calls. The three of them eventually met up, and Skinner handed Green his and Cole's marriage certificate, saying the marriage was just for legal reasons, and that he allowed Green to resume his relationship with her. Green was confused and left. Eventually, the three of them and Hauck gathered at the DoubleTree hotel in downtown Tulsa to party over the Fourth of July weekend. Skinner believes that Green stuck around because he could inform to the DEA; he had been recently arrested on a drug charge in Lebanon, Missouri.

=== Green's torture ===
Green would be tortured for six days, and the timeline of events was constructed later via witness testimony. Green said all he remembered was "paranoia and fear". At the DoubleTree, Green, Cole, and Skinner were staying at Room 1411, and William Hauck stayed in his own room. Cole and Green had sex, which Skinner was fine with. On July 3, Green performed a religious rite before taking drugs. Sometime from the 3rd to the night of the 4th, he was duct taped around his head, and with his hands behind his back. Late at night on the 4th, a woman Kristi Roberts, who got marijuana from Green, entered the room. Skinner and Cole told her that Green had too much acid the previous night, and they tied him up because he was out of control. Roberts then found a knife and cut Green free. Roberts said Green was more high than anybody she had ever seen. Cole then made a bath for him. Skinner took him out and placed him on the bed.

Later, Green was passed out. Cole said that Skinner and Hauck phoned a federal agency (maybe the FBI or CIA) as informants, and they gave their "agent numbers" during the calls. She heard Hauck expressing a wish to kill Green, but he was never able to "get authorization", and Skinner disallowed it. For some reason, Cole started believing agents were watching the hotel. Eventually, Cole saw Skinner pour a green substance, potentially salvinorin C, into Green's mouth. The substance got on Cole's arm, which made it go numb. Around this time, Hauck claims Skinner admitted to wrapping a phone cord around Green's genitals, and pulled the cord until the penis' cartilage snapped. Roberts got them to untie Green and carry him to the bath. Hauck and Skinner shaved his body hair, and Skinner injected him with vitamins and dextrose. Days later, Skinner examined Green's genitals, and theorized Green had gangrene; the group then washed Green in a bath of Epsom salts, bleach, and chlorine. After the 4th, according to Green, he woke up to Skinner punching him in the groin, saying, "You should've never touched my fiancée." Later that day, Green apologized to him for sleeping with Cole. Roberts fell asleep consoling Cole, and when she awoke, Green was gone. Cole and Skinner had lied claiming that Green had left on his own, but in all actuality, Green had been relocated to Hauck's room at some point. Cole, Skinner, and Roberts, then moved to a hotel a few blocks away.

On the 8th, Hauck suggested that it would be funny to shave Green's head, which Cole and Skinner did. Hauck was disturbed, and Skinner told him the only way for him to get out of the situation was to follow his orders. Skinner planned for Hauck to drive Green in his car to somewhere and dump him, and said he and Cole would meet up with him the next day. That night, Hauck drove Green to a motel in Texas City, Texas. He tore up the bedsheets and tied them around Green to keep him from moving.

On the 9th, Skinner went to the Tulsa DEA office with his lawyer, H.I. Aston, and expressed disagreement with his immunity agreements, asking why the DEA is conducting an investigation into him. Gregory Hough sent an email to Allen Litchfield, attorney and Skinner's former classmate, reminding him that the DEA was told to stop working with Skinner, and telling Litchfield to contact Karl Nichols and fellow agent Rogers Hanzlik: "If you've got agents talking to Skinner, they should definitely coordinate with Nichols and Hanzlik."

That evening, Skinner and Cole arrived at the motel in Texas City, where Skinner injected some substance into Green and forced him to drink another substance. Green vomited into the bathtub, and in it, Hauck saw tiny worm-like parasites. On the 10th, Hauck and Cole told Green they found a good dumping spot for him a quarter-mile away. Hauck told Green, who had a blindfold on, not to open his eyes because he burned his retinas. That evening, Hauck put Green into his car while Cole followed him from Skinner's car, and Skinner waited in the hotel. Hauck dropped Green off in a field, and told him "Just stay here". Green then fell asleep. Hauck then returned with Green's car, which he parked away from the road, as well as a blanket and snacks for Green, before driving away. On the morning of the 11th, patrol Neal Mora of the Texas City Police Department saw Green by the side of a road. An ambulance showed up, and Green was sent to a hospital. This Land wrote that it was estimated Green had about 45 minutes left to live when they arrived.

=== Aftermath ===
Skinner, Cole, and Hauck were charged with kidnapping in September. Hauck told police that Skinner was angry at Green for sleeping with Cole, and that Skinner wanted to "get even with him". Cole's charge was changed to "accessory after the fact", and she pleaded no contest. Hauck testified against Skinner, and his charge was also changed to "accessory after the fact". He claimed that since testifying, there have been two attempts on his life.

In 2007, Cole was ordered to pay a restitution of $52,109, and according to Green, she paid $4,000 before getting released from the order. Her probation lasted five years. Cole later became an entheogen expert, and wrote a book called Lysergic, detailing her experiences with Skinner. The book includes a letter she claims Skinner sent her from prison:

"I went to the DEA and got you out of trouble, you brought Brandon into my life and I got hurt bad. I asked both of you to leave for good—do you remember that??? Not only did I not lure him back to the hotel—I begged you to get him out of my room/life… The two of you should’ve stayed away from me. That was wrong, I told you."

She had said she has PTSD, claiming she was also kidnapped.

After the kidnapping, Green returned to criminal activities involving "drugs and pimping", but stopped those activities, citing his newfound Christian beliefs. He started managing a condominium complex with his wife. Green said 10 years later that he still felt pain from the incident daily.

== Imprisonment ==
In September 2003, Skinner was indicted by a federal grand jury for dealing ecstasy at the 2003 Burning Man festival in Nevada's Black Rock Desert. Police said they found 234 grams of ecstasy powder in his recreational vehicle. In January 2004, Skinner was sentenced to four years in prison, and ordered to complete 250 hours of community service.

In June 2006, a jury found Skinner guilty of kidnapping, assault with a dangerous weapon (a hypodermic needle), and conspiracy of kidnapping. He was sentenced to a life plus 90 years at Joseph Harp Correctional Center in Cleveland County, Oklahoma, adding to his sentence for the Burning Man incident. Skinner has claimed that Green's trauma was self-inflicted, as well as that the kidnapping was a government conspiracy, citing the emails of Litchfield and Hough. As of 2013, he was still married to Cole, and said he planned to sign the divorce papers eventually.

== See also ==
- History of LSD

== Sources ==
- McDougal, Dennis (2020). Operation White Rabbit: LSD, the DEA, and the Fate of the Acid King, Simon and Schuster. Google Ebook version, ISBN 9781510745384
