= Jose Silva =

Jose Silva is the name of:

- José Abello Silva, top-ranking member of Colombia's Medellín Cartel
- José Asunción Silva (1865–1896), Colombian poet
- Jose Edson Barros Silva, birth name of Edson Cariús (born 1988), Brazilian professional footballer
- José Guterres Silva (born 1998), football player who currently plays as for Timor-Leste national football team
- José Luis Silva (born 1991), Chilean footballer
- José María Silva (died 1876), Liberal Salvadoran politician
- José Silva (baseball) (born 1973), Mexican baseball player
- José Silva (basketball) (born 1989), Portuguese basketball player
- José Silva (footballer, born 1905), Portuguese footballer in the 1920s and 1930s
- José Silva (footballer, born 2005), Portuguese football right-back for Sporting
- José Silva (sailor) (1925–2018), Portuguese Olympic sailor
- José Silva (1914–1999), developer of self-help and meditation program Silva Method

== See also ==
- José da Silva (disambiguation)
