= Tim Scully =

American chemist

- Tim Scully and his cat Merlin, fixing AutoCAD bugs for Autodesk December 24, 2000
- Born: Robert Scully; August 27, 1944 (age 81); United States
- Occupations: Psychologist, chemist, computer engineer, software developer

Robert "Tim" Scully (born August 27, 1944) is an American computer engineer, best known in the psychedelic underground for his work in the production of LSD from 1966 to 1969, for which he was indicted in 1973 and convicted in 1974. His best known product, dubbed "Orange Sunshine", was considered the standard for quality LSD in 1969.

== Early life ==
Scully grew up in Pleasant Hill, which is across the Bay from San Francisco. In eighth grade, he won honorable mention in the 1958 Bay Area Science Fair for designing and building a small computer. During high school, he spent summers working at the Lawrence Berkeley Laboratory on physics problems. In his junior year of high school, Scully completed a small linear accelerator in the school science lab (he was trying to make gold atoms from mercury), which was pictured in a 1961 edition of the Oakland Tribune. Scully skipped his senior year of high school and went directly to U.C. Berkeley, majoring in mathematical physics. After two years at Berkeley, Scully took a leave of absence in 1964 because his services as an electronic design consultant were in high demand. During this period, he first took LSD on April 15, 1965.

== LSD production ==
1965: Apprentice to Owsley

Scully knew the government would move quickly to suppress LSD distribution, and he wanted to obtain as much of the main precursor chemical, lysergic acid, as possible. Scully soon learned that Owsley Stanley possessed a large amount (440 grams) of lysergic acid monohydrate. Owsley and Scully finally met a few weeks before the Trips Festival in the fall of 1965. The 30-year-old Owsley took the 21-year-old Scully as his apprentice and they pursued their mutual interest in electronics and psychedelic synthesis.

1966: Point Richmond lab and "White Lightning"

Owsley took Scully to the Watts Acid Test on February 12, 1966, and they built electronic equipment for the Grateful Dead until late spring 1966.

In July 1966 Owsley rented a house in Point Richmond, California and Owsley and Melissa Cargill (Owsley's girlfriend who was a skilled chemist) set up a lab in the basement. Tim Scully worked there as Owsley's apprentice. Owsley had developed a method of LSD synthesis which left the LSD 99.9% pure. The Point Richmond lab turned out over 300,000 tablets (270 micrograms each) of LSD they dubbed "White Lightning". LSD became illegal in California on October 6, 1966, so Owsley and Scully decided to set up a new lab in Denver, Colorado.

1967: 1st Denver lab and STP

Scully set up the new lab in the basement of a house across the street from the Denver zoo in early 1967. Owsley and Scully made the LSD in the Denver lab. 100,000 tablets (270 micrograms each) of Monterey Purple were made in Denver for the Monterey Pop Festival. Later Owsley started to tablet more of the product in Orinda, California but was arrested before he completed that work. Owsley and Scully also produced a hitherto uncommon psychedelic amphetamine in Denver which they called STP. 5,000 20 milligram tablets of STP (which was initially synthesized as "DOM" by Alexander Shulgin in 1963) were initially distributed at the Golden Gate Park summer solstice festival in 1967; however, the substance quickly acquired a bad reputation due to the excessively high dose and slow onset of action. Owsley and Scully made trial batches of 10 mg tablets and then STP mixed with LSD in a few hundred yellow tablets but soon ceased production of STP. Owsley and Scully produced about 196 grams of LSD in 1967, but 96 grams of this was confiscated by the authorities; Scully moved the lab to a different house in Denver after Owsley was arrested on Christmas Eve 1967.

1968: 2nd Denver lab and the Brotherhood of Eternal Love

Tim Scully first met Billy Hitchcock, grandson of William Larimer Mellon and great-great-grandson of Thomas Mellon, through Owsley in April 1967. They became friends and Billy loaned Scully $12,000 for the second Denver lab in 1968. The product from the lab was distributed by The Brotherhood of Eternal Love; Scully was connected with the Brotherhood via Billy Hitchcock. The second Denver lab was discovered in June 1968 by the police while Scully was in Europe searching for a new supply of precursor chemicals. His lab assistants were arrested there when they returned a few days later. Scully was not arrested at that time. The search was eventually ruled illegal and the case was dropped, but the lab had cost approximately $25,000 to set up and now Scully was looking for a new lab in addition to precursor chemicals.

1969: Windsor lab and "Orange Sunshine"

In December 1968 Nick Sand, an LSD chemist from The Brotherhood of Eternal Love in Orange County, California, purchased, through an intermediary, a farmhouse in Windsor, California, where he and Tim Scully set up a large LSD lab. Tim Scully and Nick Sand produced, by the summer of 1969, over 3.6 million tablets (300 micrograms each) of LSD they dubbed "Orange Sunshine", named after the LSD that The Brotherhood of Eternal Love distributed.

== Investigation, arrest, and trial ==
In May 1969 Tim Scully was arrested in California for the 1968 Denver lab. The search was eventually ruled illegal, but Scully decided to retire from clandestine chemistry and pursue electronic design instead. In 1969 Scully formed his own corporation, Aquarius Electronics, and he was president and sole designer from 1971–1976.

The government had been building a case against Nick Sand, Tim Scully's partner in the 1969 Windsor lab, since late 1971. In early 1973 Billy Hitchcock was threatened with 24 years in prison for tax evasion if he didn't help the government convict the prime movers of the LSD cartel. Hitchcock provided evidence and testified against Scully and Sand, and they were both indicted in April 1973. Scully's defense was that he was producing ALD-52, which was legal, and not the controlled substance LSD-25. Scully lost the case and was convicted and sentenced to 20 years in prison in 1974. Scully's appeals ran out in late 1976, so he sold his stock in his company and began serving prison time in early 1977.

Scully spent his time in prison helping design and build biofeedback and interface systems for the non-vocal handicapped. He also received a Ph.D. in psychology from the regionally accredited Humanistic Psychology Institute in 1979. Following the reduction of his sentence to ten years, he was released from prison on parole in August 1979.

== Later life ==
Following his release from prison, Scully was a lecturer in parapsychology at John F. Kennedy University (where he co-taught a course on psychotechnology and computers) and held a part-time appointment as an assistant research psychologist in the psychophysiology laboratory at the University of California, San Francisco's Langley Porter Psychiatric Institute. As the founder of Pacific Bionic Systems (reformed in 1980 as Mendocino Microcomputers, with Scully continuing as president and chairman), he consulted with such diverse entities as the Esalen Institute and the Children's Television Workshop (now Sesame Workshop) on database management and computer games. He has published eight articles on the topic of biofeedback and as many on technical computer topics.

He has retired from his career with Autodesk as an AutoCAD dealer (1983-1987), consultant (1987-2000) and senior software developer (2000-2005) and is currently researching a book on the underground history of LSD.

== In film ==
Scully and Sand are the subjects of the 2015 documentary The Sunshine Makers.

== See also ==
- Counterculture of the 1960s
- Casey William Hardison
- History of LSD
- William Leonard Pickard
- Psychonautics
- List of psychedelic chemists
