= José da Silva =

José da Silva may refer to:

- José da Silva (canoeist) (born 1971), Portuguese Olympic canoer
- José da Silva (sport shooter), Portuguese Olympic shooter in 1948
- José Alves Correia da Silva (1872–1957), Bishop of Leiria
- José Alencar (1931–2011), Gomes da Silva, Brazilian politician, vice president of Brazil from 2003 to 2010
- José Cláudio da Silva (1957–2011), Brazilian conservationist and environmentalist
- José da Silva (footballer, born 1991), São Toméan footballer who plays for UDRA
- José Manuel Ribeiro da Silva, Portuguese racing cyclist
- Captain Jose Da Silva, a protagonist in a series of mystery novels by Robert L. Fish

== See also ==
- Jose Silva (disambiguation)
