= José Silva (footballer, born 1905) =

Portuguese footballer

Personal information
- Full name: José da Silva
- Place of birth: Portugal

Senior career*
Years	Team	Apps	(Gls)
- União Coimbra
- União Lisboa

International career
1929–1931	Portugal	2	(0)
- * Club domestic league appearances and goals

José da Silva was a Portuguese footballer.
