= Nicholas Sand =

American clandestine chemist

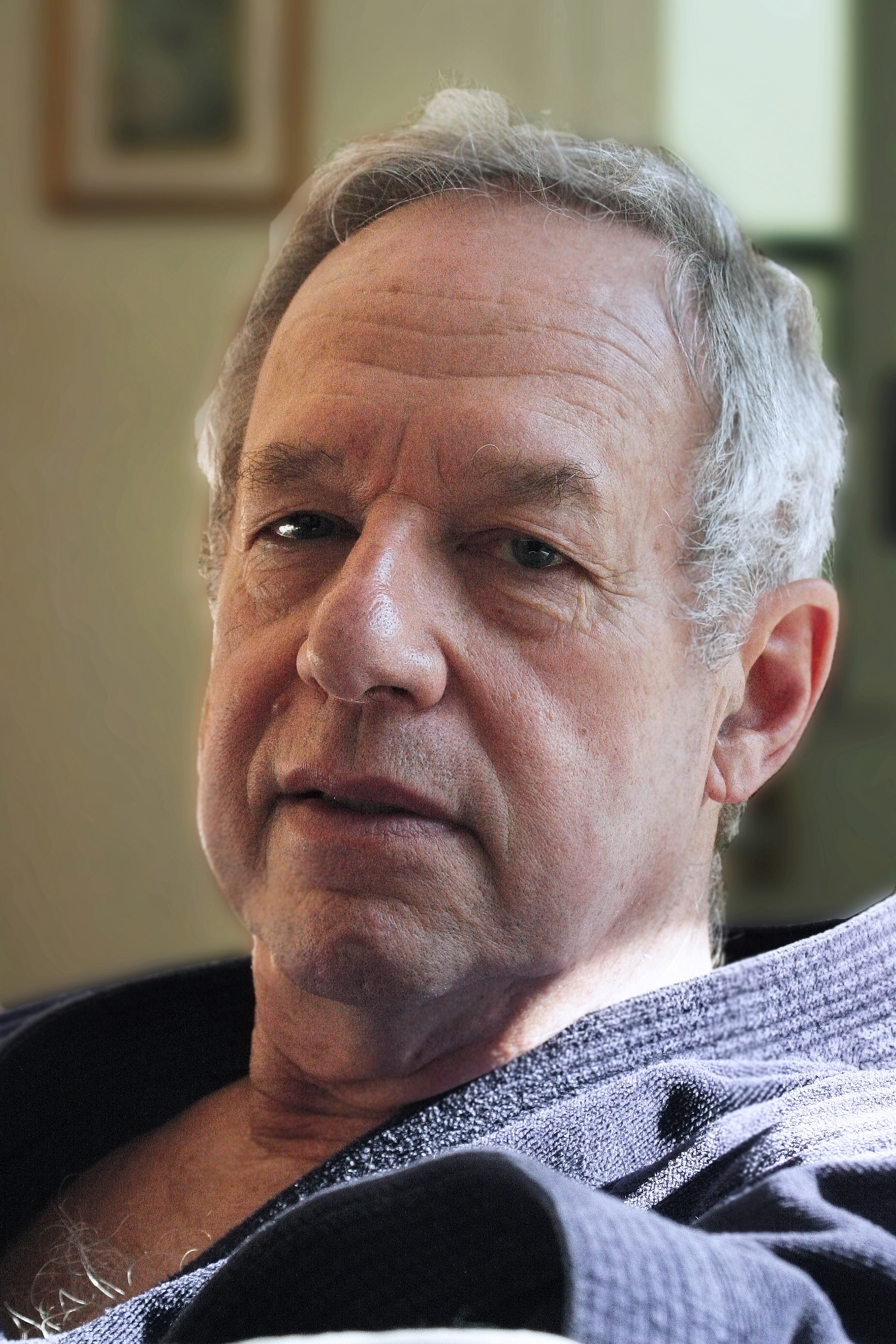
- Sand in 2009
- Born: Nicholas Francis Hiskey; May 10, 1941; New York City, New York, U.S.
- Died: April 24, 2017 (aged 75); Lagunitas, California, U.S.
- Education: Brooklyn College
- Occupation: Clandestine chemist

Nicholas Sand (born Nicholas Francis Hiskey; May 10, 1941 – April 24, 2017) was an American advocate of the use of psychedelic drugs. He became cult figure as a clandestine chemist for the Brotherhood of Eternal Love. Sand was part of the League for Spiritual Discovery at the Millbrook estate in New York, has been credited as the "first underground chemist on record to have synthesized DMT" and is known for manufacturing large amounts of LSD.

== Early life ==
Sand was born in Brooklyn, New York City, on May 10, 1941. His father, Clarence Hiskey, was a researcher in the Manhattan Project's Metallurgical Laboratory who attempted to spy for the Soviet Union. After his parents divorced, Sand took his mother's maiden name.

Sand graduated from Erasmus Hall High School in 1959 and then spent a year working on a kibbutz in Israel. He graduated from Brooklyn College with a degree in anthropology and sociology in 1966.

== Career ==
Sand became interested in the teachings of George Gurdjieff, the study of different cultures, and various Eastern philosophers. In 1961, he had his first mescaline experience. Shortly after graduating from college, Sand followed Leary and Alpert to Millbrook. During this time Sand also began synthesizing DMT in his bathtub, and he is credited with being the first to discover that it was active when volatilized (smoked).

Sand later started Bell Perfume Labs as a front for the production of mescaline and DMT.

Sand and David L. Mantell were arrested on April 1, 1967 when their truck failed to stop at the Dinosaur, Colorado Port of Entry. The truck was eventually searched and federal agents reportedly found 313,000 doses of LSD and a laboratory-on-wheels.

In 1967 Sand was introduced to fellow chemist Tim Scully, who trained under Owsley Stanley until Stanley's legal troubles in December 1967.

In December 1968 Sand purchased a secluded farmhouse in Windsor, California, a small town in rural Sonoma County. There he and Scully set up a large LSD lab. Here they produced over 3.6 million tablets of LSD that was distributed under the name "Orange Sunshine, which was considered the quality standard for LSD in 1969.

== 1972 indictments ==
A joint state, federal and local strike force called "Operation BEL" was assembled in early 1972. On August 3, 1972, the Orange County, California, Grand Jury returned an indictment against 29 alleged members of the Brotherhood of Eternal Love, including Sand; the indictment was primarily aimed at the hashish smuggling arm of the Brotherhood.

The investigation continued and on December 6, 1972, the Orange County, California, Grand Jury returned another indictment, this time aimed primarily against the Brotherhood of Eternal Love's "Orange Sunshine" LSD system; Sand was included in that indictment too.

== 1973 arrest and prosecution ==
On January 19, 1973 "Leland H. Jordan" (later identified as Sand) and Judy Neal Shaughnessy were arrested on drug charges by Kirkwood, Missouri, police, shortly after they arrived from San Francisco. Their residence at 425 North Highway 21 in Fenton, Missouri, an elaborate hilltop home on 18 acres of land, had been found to contain hundreds of gallons of chemicals and elaborate laboratory equipment.

On April 25, 1973, Sand, Tim Scully, Michael Randall, and four other major figures in the LSD operation were indicted by a Federal grand jury in San Francisco.

On January 30, 1974, Sand and Scully were found guilty, partially due to the testimony of Billy Hitchcock and other informants. On March 8, 1974, Sand was sentenced to 15 years in a federal penitentiary.

The defense presented at his trial claimed that the defendants had made ALD-52 instead of LSD-25.

Sand's attorney appealed his conviction, based on four technical legal issues, namely, pre-indictment delay, refusal to suppress bank records, lack of a taint hearing and use of Swiss bank records. The appeal was denied by the Ninth Circuit Court of Appeals on September 13, 1976, and rehearing was denied October 8, 1976.

LSD chemist William Leonard Pickard contributed to Sand's legal defense fund.

Sand fled to Canada in 1976, evading imprisonment. LSD historian Mark McCloud reports that Sand then traveled to the ashram of so-called "sex guru" Rajneesh in west India. Sand eventually returned to North America, again producing large quantities of LSD. Sand was arrested for drug manufacturing in 1990 in British Columbia, but as he was living under an alias, police did not determine his identity and Sand fled while on bail.

== 1996 arrest ==
Sand was arrested again in 1996 in Canada. Refusing to cooperate with the police, it took forensic investigators two months to determine Sand's real identity. Police found 43 grams of crystalline LSD at Sand's laboratory, approximately 430,000 doses of LSD. The bust also uncovered six million dollars' worth of designer drugs such as MDMA, and hundreds of thousands of dollars in laboratory equipment. In 1998 he pleaded guilty and was sentenced to 14 years to be served in an American prison. He was paroled in 2001.

== Death ==
Sand died of a heart attack in his sleep at his home in Lagunitas, California, on April 24, 2017, at the age of 75.

== See also ==
- Casey William Hardison
- History of lysergic acid diethylamide
- Psychonautics
- Counterculture of the 1960s
- The Sunshine Makers
- List of psychedelic chemists
