= José Abello Silva =

Colombian cartel member

José Rafael Abello Silva (alias: "Mono Abello") is a former top-ranking member of Colombia's notorious Medellín Cartel. He was considered among the major drug traffickers in the Santa Marta region and the reputed chief of Caribbean coast operations on the cartel's behalf. During January 1987, Abello was included in a group of 128 major narcotics figures whose capture was ordered by President Virgilio Barco. Although he was captured in Barranquilla during that same month, he was released shortly thereafter, apparently with the help of Miguel Pinedo Barros, a senator in La Guajira and reputed protector of cocaine traffickers.

He was indicted by a United States federal grand jury in Tulsa, Oklahoma, during 1987 on charges of conspiring to import and distribute cocaine into the United States. The Drug Enforcement Administration said that Abello "was considered a major transporter for the Medellín cartel," responsible for "major shipments of cocaine and marijuana into the states." Abello was the cartel's chief of operations for Colombia's northern coast. Specifically, the DEA estimated that Abello's trafficking ring was responsible for the importation of more than 1,700 pounds of cocaine into the United States.

== Arrest, extradition and sentencing ==
Abello was arrested Wednesday, October 11, 1989, while dining at a restaurant in Bogotá. According to the Colombian Administrative Security Department, at the time of his arrest Abello was the seventh-ranking man in the Medellín cartel hierarchy. On October 16, 1989, he was transferred into the custody of U.S. Marshals Service agents and was immediately put on a plane to Tulsa, Oklahoma. His extradition brought to five the number of accused drug traffickers sent to the United States since President Virgilio Barco re-established extradition on August 18, 1989, in response to a string of assassinations attributed to the cocaine cartels.

=== Trial ===
By the time he came to trial during April 1989, the prosecution charged that Abello had undergone plastic surgery to alter his appearance, had arranged numerous killings in Colombia, and had attempted to bribe the Colombian police who arrested him. According to the U.S. government, Abello was guilty as charged and probably guilty of many other crimes. Abello, however, claimed he is innocent, that he is a wealthy cattle rancher, automobile importer, and part-time bullfighter. He also claimed he was the victim of the complementary interests of a jailed Colombian intent on escaping punishment and a U.S. public prosecutor intent on showing progress in that country's fight against drug dealers.

=== Sentencing ===
On May 19, 1990, Federal district Judge Thomas Brett in Tulsa, Oklahoma sentenced José Abello to 30 years in prison and fined him $5 million. Abello was convicted on one count of conspiracy to import cocaine and marijuana into the United States and one count of conspiracy to possess drugs with the intent to distribute. In passing the sentence, Judge Thomas Brett said the treaty under which the defendant was extradited from Colombia during Fall 1989 provided a maximum sentence of 30 years. However, Abello's sentence was later reduced and he was released on July 23, 2007.

=== Murder attempts ===
After being released from prison and being back in Colombia, he survived three murder attempts in the city of Santa Marta. There were 2007; 2008, which left him severely injured; and 2012, on the beach of El Rodadero.

== See also ==
- Pablo Escobar
- Medellín Cartel
- War on drugs
- Cocaine Cowboys (2006 film)
