= Casey William Hardison =

American chemist (born 1971)

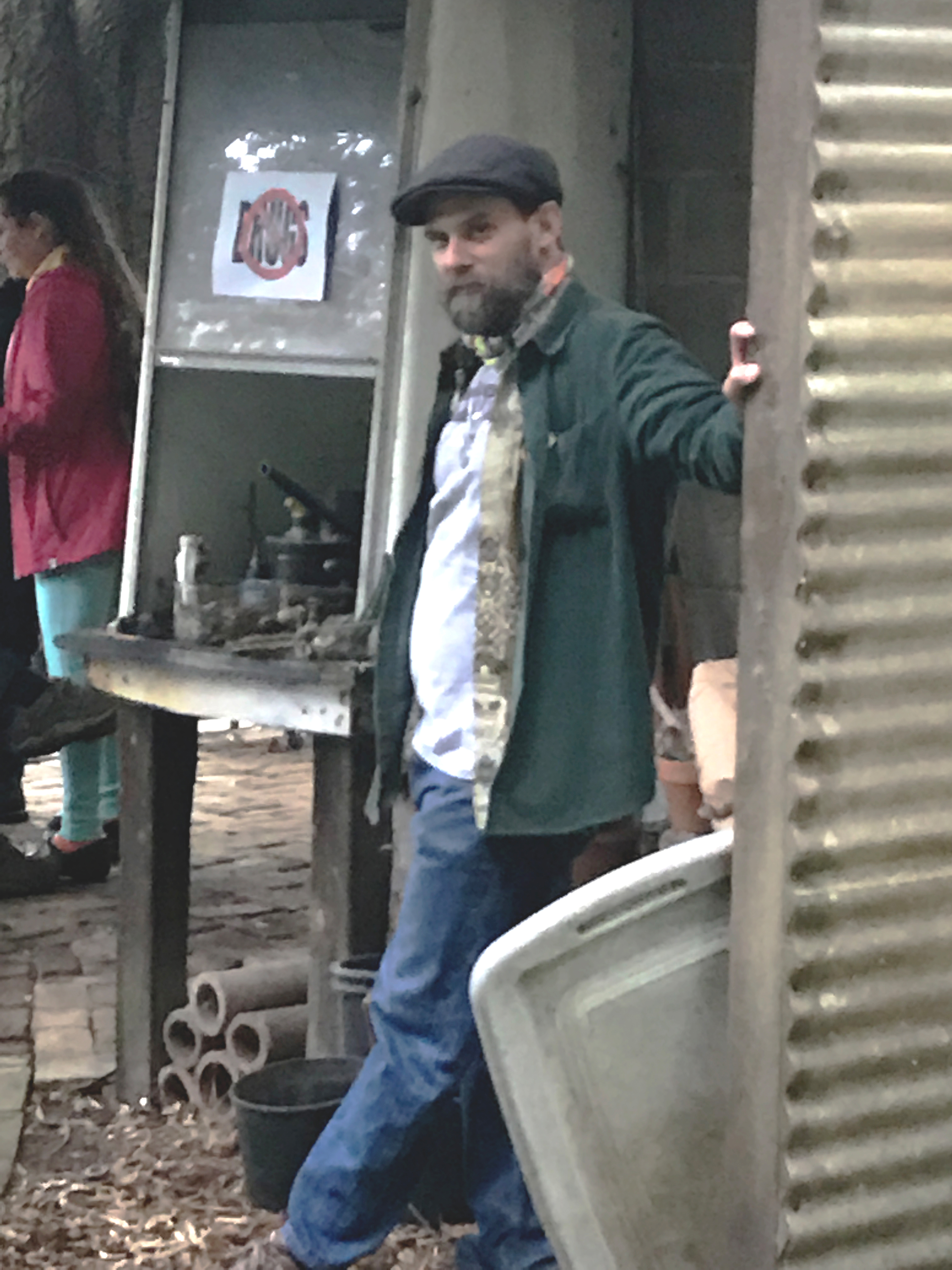
- Casey Hardison, Easter 2017
- Born: 1971 (age 54–55)
- Known for: Manufacture of psychedelic drugs

Casey William Hardison (born 1971) is an American chemist convicted in the United Kingdom in 2005 of six offences involving psychedelic drugs: three of production, two of possession, and one of exportation.

== Background ==
Hardison was born in Washington state in the summer of 1971. He is committed to the entheogenic use of psychedelic substances.

=== Research ===
In 2000, the Multidisciplinary Association for Psychedelic Studies published in its bulletin Hardison's "An Amateur Qualitative Study of 48 2C-T-7 Subjective Bioassays." According to Hardison, 2C-T-7 is "a fairly novel entheogenic compound that has been used in a limited context as an adjunct in psychedelic psychotherapy since 1986."

=== Activism ===
The Drug Equality Alliance, a nonprofit organization working to secure equal rights and protections for drug users, was set up by lawyer Darryl Bickler inspired by Hardison's legal arguments.

== Crimes ==
After moving to Brighton, Hardison illegally manufactured three class A drugs: 2C-B, DMT, and LSD. Having set up a laboratory in his rented bungalow, he used £38,386 worth of chemical ingredients to produce hallucinogenic tablets with a street value of up to £5m.

=== Arrest ===
In July 2003, Hardison sent two packages to the U.S. During a random inspection at the FedEx hub in Memphis, Tennessee, officials found four bags of MDMA (Ecstasy) hidden between pages of a magazine. MDMA is a psychoactive drug used primarily as a recreational drug at parties and raves. Thus alerted, British authorities monitored Hardison until arresting him near Brighton in February 2004.

=== Legal proceedings ===
The case was complicated by the involvement of U.S. law enforcement agents, some of whom attended the trial as witnesses. Hardison represented himself in court.

==== Pre-trial arguments ====
Hardison challenged the drug laws as violating his cognitive liberty and his rights to freedom of thought, therapy and religion, contending that his basic human rights and liberties were violated by his arrest, detention and prosecution. In response, the judge of the Crown Court wrote, "I have come to the sure and clear conclusion that Mr. Hardison's arguments are misconceived and I reject each and every one of the Human Rights arguments."

==== Trial and conviction ====
In March 2005, after a 10-week trial at Lewes Crown Court, the jury found Hardison guilty. Calling him a "dangerous individual," the judge said Hardison was motivated by greed and set up his ‘illegal’ drug factory—which a chemist from the Forensic Science Service called the most complex laboratory he had ever encountered—in the UK because U.S. drug laws were "too hot." The court was told Hardison's father used proceeds of his son's crimes to buy a yacht.

==== Sentence ====
In April 2005, Hardison was sentenced to twenty years imprisonment in the UK with a recommendation that he be deported upon his release.

==== Appeals ====
In May 2006, the Court of Appeal of England and Wales rejected Hardison's first application for leave to appeal, finding that none of his grounds had sufficient merit. In his decision, Justice Keith wrote that Hardison's criminal enterprise "was not an amateurish operation in a garden shed. It was a careful and calculated attempt to introduce new synthetic drugs onto the UK market which could have reaped great financial rewards."

Subsequently, the House of Lords (then the court of last resort for UK criminal law) refused Hardison's final appeal, and his similar appeal to the European Court of Human Rights likewise failed.

=== Prison life ===
Hardison found drugs readily available in prison. "LSD, 2C-B, DMT, pharmahuasca, research chemicals, kratom, cannabis, home-brewed alcohol—I did a whole bunch of shit in there," he told Vice in 2014. "Drugs are more available in prison than they would be for the common man trying to find them on the street. And the British prison system is fairly gentle—it's pretty damn civilized."

=== Release ===
Following his release from prison in May 2013, Hardison was deported from the UK to the U.S. After living in Victor, Idaho, he moved to Northern California.

== Post-incarceration ==
=== Death of Anthony Birkholz ===
On January 17, 2017, in Jackson Hole, Wyoming, after drinking heavily, Hardison and two other men consumed a substance believed by the Teton County, Wyoming coroner to be the psychedelic drug 5-MeO-DMT. One of the men, artist and filmmaker Anthony Birkholz, died from aspiration of vomitus secondary to food, alcohol and 5-MeO-DMT ingestion. The jury at the coroner's inquest found that Birkholz's death was accidental but could have been prevented. Hardison called 5-MeO-DMT "a very rare, beautiful experience," but admitted he hadn't done any since the night Birkholz died. "Looking back now," he said, "I'm not so charmed."

==== Aftermath ====
A day after Birkholz's death, Hardison launched a GoFundMe page, "Tony Birkholz Slips the Mortal Coil," raising $6,100. "This campaign," Hardison wrote, "intends to raise memorial funds and to ensure his remains reach his intended destination. Any remaining funds will be donated to the Buffalo Field Campaign, West Yellowstone, Montana, in the fight to protect the last remaining wild buffalo." After several hundred people attended a vigil at the Pink Garter, a music venue and cocktail lounge in Jackson, Wyoming, Hardison said part of the $6,100 raised online paid for the open bar that night. None of the remaining $3,900, however, was immediately donated as pledged to the Buffalo Field Campaign.

===== Arrest in Idaho =====
In February 2017, Hardison was stopped in Bellevue, Idaho, for speeding. After a drug-sniffing dog detected controlled drugs, police searched Hardison's vehicle. They found $7,928 in cash, about two pounds (≈ 0.9 kg) of marijuana, a half gram of cocaine and what was believed to be heroin. However, tests by the Idaho State Police labs determined that the suspected substance was not heroin. Hardison admitted that half of the $7,928 in cash was the missing GoFundMe money collected to honor Tony Birkholz. On March 21, Hardison pleaded not guilty to charges stemming from the traffic stop.

In June 2017, a member of Birkholz's family filed a complaint with the FBI's Internet Crime Complaint Center accusing Hardison of fraud. The $3,900 donation to the Buffalo Field Campaign in honor of Anthony Birkholz was finally made in September 2020.

In August 2017, all charges against Hardison, including three felony counts and one misdemeanor, were dismissed after a judge ruled that the traffic stop was unconstitutionally delayed without reasonable suspicion, allowing a canine officer time to detect the presence of controlled substances.

=== Attempted arrest in Wyoming ===
According to the Jackson Hole News & Guide, on August 6, 2018, police attempted to arrest Hardison for selling a large quantity of marijuana to an undercover officer. However, Hardison eluded them after a high-speed chase.

=== Arrest in California ===
On July 28, 2020, Hardison was arrested in Yorkville, CA, by the Mendocino County Sheriff's Office. A $500,000 Fugitive From Justice warrant saw Hardison extradited back to Jackson, to face charges stemming from the botched sting operation by Wyoming officers. On November 17, 2020, in his defense, Hardison planned to present a motion to Dismiss the Indictment based on the premise that the Wyoming Controlled Substances Act, W.S. § 35-7-1001 et seq., ("the Act") violates his due process and equal protection rights guaranteed by the Wyoming Constitution and the Constitution for the United States of America.

=== Arrest in Black Rock City, Nevada ===
On September 2, 2024, Hardison was arrested at the annual Burning Man festival by the Pershing County Sheriff's Office for Sexual Assault, Arrest on Other-Agency Warrant, and for Possession of Scheduled (1) or (2) C/S LT 14 Grams, 1st or 2nd Offense. The Arrest on Other-Agency Warrant was due to an outstanding warrant related to the prior Wyoming charges, after Casey again left the Jackson Hole area before his legal situation was resolved.

=== 2024 presidential campaign ===
In a January 22, 2021 interview with the Jackson Hole News&Guide, Casey Hardison announced his 2024 bid for president. Before he slipped underground again, Hardison had planned to run for President in the forthcoming general election as a candidate for a revived Democratic-Republican Party, originally founded by Thomas Jefferson and James Madison in 1792.

== Media appearances ==
Hardison has appeared on the television shows Hamilton's Pharmacopeia and Trafficked with Mariana van Zeller.

== See also ==
- Cognitive liberty
- Clandestine chemistry
- Darrell Lemaire
- William Leonard Pickard
- Nicholas Sand
