= The Sunshine Makers (2015 film) =

2015 British documentary film

- Directed by: Cosmo Feilding-Mellen
- Written by: Connie Littlefield
- Produced by: Omar Fayed
- Starring: Nicholas Sand, Tim Scully
- Release date: November 3, 2015 (DOC NYC)
- Running time: 1 hour, 41 minutes
- Language: English

The Sunshine Makers is a 2015 British documentary film directed by Cosmo Feilding-Mellen, written and produced by Connie Littlefield, and executive produced by Omar Fayed. It is about Nicholas Sand and Tim Scully, central figures during the counterculture of the 1960s. It premiered at Doc NYC on 16 November 2015.

The score was composed by London-based musical collective The Heliocentrics and released on Soundway Records in 2017.

== See also ==
- List of psychedelic documentaries
