= The Brotherhood of Eternal Love =

American organization of drug users and distributors

- Founded by: John Griggs
- Founding location: Orange County, California, United States
- Criminal activities: Drug use, manufacturing and distribution

The Brotherhood of Eternal Love was an organization of drug users and distributors that operated from the mid-1960s through the late 1970s in Orange County, California. They were dubbed the Hippie Mafia by the police. They produced and distributed drugs in hopes of starting a "psychedelic revolution" in the United States.

== History ==
In the mid-1960s, John Griggs and others were members of a car gang called the Street Sweepers in Anaheim, California. In 1966, they robbed a Hollywood producer at gunpoint and stole a large amount of LSD from him. Griggs then proceed to try the LSD that they had stolen. With this experience, Griggs underwent a transformation that dramatically changed his life. He renounced violence, threw away his gun, and even apologized and returned the stolen goods to the Hollywood producer. He and the other Street Sweepers became psychedelic evangelists and reincorporated themselves as the Brotherhood of Eternal Love. This included registering as a tax-exempt religious organization.

The organization was started by Griggs as a commune, but by 1969, had turned to the manufacture of LSD and the importing of hashish. Appearing in 1968 as an orange tablet measuring about 6 mm across, "Orange Sunshine" acid was the first largely available form of LSD after its possession was made illegal. Tim Scully, a prominent chemist, made some of these tablets, but said that most "Sunshine" in the USA came by way of Ronald Stark, who imported approximately thirty-five million doses from Europe.

In July 1969, Charlene Almeida, a friend of Timothy Leary's daughter, drowned in a pond on the Brotherhood's ranch (near Idyllwild) while under the influence of LSD. Leary was charged with contributing to the delinquency of a minor and five members of the Brotherhood were arrested on marijuana-related charges. A month later Griggs died from ingesting a crystallized form of psilocybin, likely containing adulterants. (Note: Lee writes instead that Griggs died of a PCP overdose.) Lee writes that after Griggs' death a new element assumed leadership of the organization, with a "more competitive and cutthroat" approach to the business. Robert ("Fat Bobby") Andrist took control of the Brotherhood's hashish distribution operation, while Michael Boyd Randall and Nicholas Sand managed its LSD business.

In 1970, The Brotherhood of Eternal Love hired the radical left organization Weather Underground for a fee of $25,000 to help Leary make his way to Algeria after he escaped from prison, while serving a ten-year sentence for possession of marijuana.

Their activities came to an end on August 5, 1972, when a drug raid was executed on the group where dozens of group members in California, Oregon and Maui were arrested. Some who had escaped the raid continued underground or fled abroad. More members were arrested in 1994 and 1996, and the last of them in 2009; Brenice Lee Smith served two months in jail before pleading guilty to a single charge of smuggling hashish, and then was released after being sentenced to time served.

== In film ==
The Brotherhood of Eternal Love feature in the fictional films Rainbow Bridge (1971) and Mr Nice (2010), as well as the documentaries The Sunshine Makers (2015) and Orange Sunshine (2016).
