= William Leonard Pickard =

American convicted felon

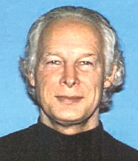
- Born: October 21, 1945 (age 80); DeKalb County, Georgia, US
- Education: Princeton University; Harvard University
- Occupations: Researcher, writer
- Status: Released after serving 20 years of two life sentences

William Leonard Pickard (born October 21, 1945) is one of two people convicted in the largest lysergic acid diethylamide (LSD) manufacturing case in history. In 2000, while moving their LSD laboratory across Kansas, Pickard and Clyde Apperson were pulled over while driving a Ryder rental truck and a follow car. The laboratory had been stored near a renovated Atlas-E missile silo near Wamego, Kansas. Gordon Todd Skinner, one of the men intimately involved in the case but not charged due to his cooperation, owned the property where the laboratory equipment was stored.

On July 27, 2020, Pickard was granted compassionate release from federal prison 20 years into his sentence.

== Background ==
Prior to his arrest, Pickard was deputy director of the Drug Policy Research Program at the University of California, Los Angeles. He came from a well-to-do family; his father was a lawyer and his stepmother was a fungal disease expert at the Centers for Disease Control and Prevention. In high school, he was an honors student, played basketball, and was named "most intellectual". He earned a scholarship to Princeton University, but dropped out after one term, instead preferring to hang out at Greenwich Village jazz clubs. In 1971, he got a job as a research manager at the University of California, Berkeley, Department of Bacteriology and Immunology, a job he held until 1974. From then on, his academic resume begins a 20-year gap.

It is reported by LSD historian Mark McCloud that Pickard worked with a group of LSD traffickers, known as the Clear Light System, in the 1960s. Pickard is said to have contributed to LSD chemist Nicholas Sand's legal fund following Sand's arrest in 1972. Pickard also reportedly had a background manufacturing the drug MDA.

In December 1988, a neighbor reported a strange chemical odor coming from an architectural shop at a Mountain View, California, industrial park. Federal agents arrived to find 200,000 doses of LSD and Pickard inside. Pickard was charged with manufacturing LSD and served five years in prison.

By 1994, Pickard had enrolled at the John F. Kennedy School of Government at Harvard University. There, he focused on drug abuse in the former Soviet Union, where he theorized that the booming black market and many unemployed chemists could lead to a flood of the drug market.

== LSD manufacturing ==
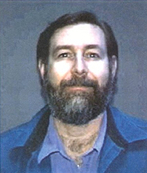
Pickard's accomplice Clyde Apperson

It is not publicly known where Pickard initially produced LSD. His first arrest for manufacturing LSD came on December 28, 1988, in Mountain View, California. The laboratory was contained inside a trailer that had been moved into a warehouse. It contained state-of-the-art equipment, including a roto-evaporator, heating mantles and a pill press. He was producing kilogram quantities of LSD and putting them onto windowpane (gel), microdot (tablet), and blotter forms (blotter paper). He spent time in prison for this and became a Buddhist while inside.

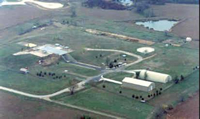
Former missile silo in Kansas 39°13′22″N 96°19′32″W

Pickard had laboratories in a number of different locations. Pickard never liked to stay at one location more than two years so as not to draw attention to himself. In early 1996, the lab was located in Oregon; it was subsequently moved to Aspen, Colorado, in late 1996. From September 1997 to September 1999, the laboratory was located in Santa Fe, New Mexico. He liked the Santa Fe location for a number of reasons; his overhead costs were lower and the precursor source was closer. He also liked the fact that there was virtually no humidity, which can affect the production of LSD. All of the laboratories are alleged to have produced a kilogram of LSD approximately every five weeks. Gordon Todd Skinner became involved with Pickard and his partner Clyde Apperson in February 1998. It is rumored that Pickard and Skinner were introduced to each other in a somewhat formal gathering of various LSD dealers and chemists. The meeting is said to have taken place in the former home of Jerry and Carolyn Garcia (Mountain Girl), where Skinner was allegedly then living.

One of his main customers was a man named "Petaluma Al" from Petaluma, California. Pickard would always arrange for the produced LSD to be transported to the Denver, Colorado, or Boulder, Colorado, area to be mailed or picked up so that Petaluma Al would never know where the laboratory was located. Most of Petaluma Al's customers were overseas in Europe, which meant that in addition to millions of dollars in United States currency, Pickard also handled millions in Dutch guilders and Canadian bank notes. He preferred to deal in ƒ1,000 notes or Canadian $1,000 notes (discontinued since 2000 in Canada) because it meant less bulk cash to have on hand. He required his distributors to convert all lower currencies into $50 or $100 notes at the least so as not to cause problems.

Although Apperson and Pickard were arrested moving the laboratory from the Atlas-E silo location, they never actually produced LSD at this site. The laboratory had been moved there without Pickard's or Apperson's knowledge by the government's informant, Gordon Todd Skinner. When Pickard arrived back in town and learned that Skinner had moved the lab there, they immediately began preparations to move it. Unknown to them, Skinner had begun cooperating with the DEA and had already allowed them to go inside the property to look around. Based on what they saw during this visit, they applied for a search warrant, which was subsequently signed by a federal judge. Apperson drove the Ryder rental truck with the laboratory in it and Pickard followed in a Buick LeSabre; they had walkie-talkies to maintain communication. On November 6, 2000 the DEA had a Kansas Highway Patrol car pull them over to not arouse suspicion; however, they immediately recognized something was wrong and Pickard, being a marathon runner, took off into the woods on foot and was not captured until the next day.

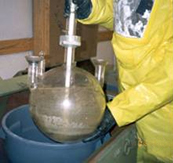
Glassware seized

Authorities found less than 6 oz (170 g) of ergotamine tartrate during the arrest. However, they claim they normally produced up to a kilogram of LSD every five weeks. This would produce approximately ten million 100-microgram doses. Although the DEA claims this would be worth $40 million on the street, Pickard did not sell anywhere near the "street" or retail level. Government informant Skinner testified that Petaluma Al and the largest wholesale customers of Pickard paid 29 cents per 100 μg dose, which would put the cost at around $2.97 million for a kilogram of LSD.

Apperson was Pickard's partner and was reportedly a skilled chemist, but his role was mainly in the setup and take-down of the laboratory. He was allegedly paid $100,000 for assembling and $50,000 for packing away the lab. Apperson reportedly manufactured synthetic mescaline. When authorities searched his Sunnyvale, California, home, they found five drums of precursor chemicals needed to manufacture synthetic mescaline.

Both Pickard and Apperson were eventually found guilty at trial of conspiring to manufacture, distribute, and dispense ten grams or more of a mixture or substance containing a detectable amount of lysergic acid diethylamide (LSD); Pickard received two life sentences, while Apperson received 30 years' imprisonment.

=== Scale of production ===
According to court testimony, Pickard's lab produced up to a kilogram of LSD approximately every five weeks for short periods. Despite criticism for their methodology, the DEA contends that there was a 99.5% drop in the availability of LSD in the US in the two years following the arrest. Pickard himself has long denied these claims. In his 2008 paper "International LSD Prevalence – Factors Affecting Proliferation and Control", Pickard suggests that since the 1960s, LSD production has always been de-centralized. As to a turn-of-the-century decline in availability due to his own arrest, Pickard highlights the fact that LSD availability had been on the decline since 1996, a fact which he correlates in part with the exponential growth of availability and demand for MDMA and other hallucinogenic drugs. The actual quantity of LSD seized by the DEA remains unclear, with figures ranging from 198.9 grams to 41.3 kilograms (410 million 100 μg hits of LSD).

The turn-of-the-century "acid drought" was likely due to a number of factors, perhaps including but not limited to the arrest of Pickard. According to Heads: A Biography of Psychedelic America, additional factors included the 1996 arrest of longtime LSD chemist Nicholas Sand and the death of a man involved in the illicit sale of LSD precursor materials. Grateful Dead concerts provided a primary distribution network for LSD, and this network dissolved when the Grateful Dead stopped touring in 1995.

== Imprisonment ==
While serving two life sentences at the U.S. Penitentiary at Tucson, Arizona, Pickard conducted research on civil liberties, justice and drug-related topics. He wrote of his concerns about the opioid epidemic in the United States, and responded to media and academic requests on the subject. The website "Free William Leonard Pickard" posted regular updates about his activities until September 2017. In 2015 he published a novel, The Rose of Paracelsus.

Pickard discussed his imprisonment with the writer and former LSD seller Seth Ferranti in 2016: "While doing research in unstable regions abroad, amid the chaos, I found my way by noticing the instances of humanity. Captive populations are similar; courtesy and service to others is the only path. ... long-term prisoners, especially the nonviolent who may be captive for decades, somehow retain a certain dignity. In all these years, lost among the thousands, I have seen only one man cry." He described teaching a fellow inmate to read: "it was a privilege each morning to teach reading to an illiterate black man in his forties. We laughed sometimes, but always yearned for our families ... He hid Jack and Jill from his cellmate, so others would not ridicule him. I asked why he wanted to learn. He replied, 'So I can read bedtime stories to my children.' How very brave he was." In addition, Pickard also met and befriended Silk Road website founder Ross Ulbricht while in prison, and maintains contact with his family.

On July 27, 2020, Pickard was released from prison on compassionate grounds with the court citing his advanced age and medical conditions in light of the COVID-19 pandemic. Apperson was also released. On December 12, 2024, Apperson's sentence was commuted by President Joe Biden.

== Publications ==
Pickard's 2008 paper "International LSD Prevalence – Factors Affecting Proliferation and Control" questions the validity of law enforcement reports about LSD manufacturing, and discusses the civil liberties threats posed by the DEA's NADDIS database system.

In 2011 Pickard authored an overview of the NADDIS system entitled "DEA's NADDIS System: A Guide for Attorneys, the Courts, and Researchers".

=== The Rose of Paracelsus ===
In 2015, Pickard published The Rose of Paracelsus: On Secrets & Sacraments, a 656-page autobiography that blends fiction and nonfiction. The book centers on six chemists in an international drug organization. One of the Six tells Pickard, the book's narrator, that the making of psychedelics is not just following a recipe or formula but requires "the requisite spirit ... the purest intent, a flawless diamond morality". He says it's the same spirit described in Thomas De Quincey and Jorge Luis Borges's short stories about Paracelsus, the 16th-century physician and alchemist of Basel who resurrected a rose from its ashes: "there could be no creation for lack of faith and the trust of gold".

Writing while incarcerated, Pickard wrote the entire book with pencil and paper. In an interview with Seth Ferranti, Pickard recounted: "The Rose was handwritten in two years, without notes and based on recollection, but seemed too trivial to honor the reader. I destroyed the work in minutes, then began again. It took another three years to compose, then a year to edit the 656 pages."

Readings of The Rose of Paracelsus were presented at the University of Greenwich in London in June 2017. Readers included British artist and Resonance FM radio host Simon Tyszko, SEED Restaurant founder Greg Sams and post-doctoral fellow in literature Neşe Devenot. In November 2016, British actor Dudley Sutton did readings of The Rose of Paracelsus at Reading Gaol, in Oscar Wilde's former cell. The Rose also has been reviewed by author and Psychedelic Museum founder Julian Vayne.

In November 2017, readings from The Rose were presented at the Altered Conference Berlin, and in December 2017 The Rose was discussed on the major podcast The Joe Rogan Experience with Duncan Trussell.

== See also ==
- List of psychedelic chemists
- Lizard Labs
- Akasha Song

== External websites ==
- Official website
- Erowid: William Leonard Pickard Vault
