= USCO =

American media art collective

USCO art in Walker Art Center's exhibit catalogue for Hippie Modernism: The Struggle for Utopia

USCO was an American media art collective in the 1960s, founded by Gerd Stern, Michael Callahan, Steve Durkee, Judi Stern, and Barbara Durkee in New York. The name USCO is an acronym for Us Company or the Company of Us. The collective was most active during the years 1964–66. USCO exhibited in the United States, Canada, and Europe, and is considered a key link in the development of expanded cinema, visual music, installation art, multimedia, intermedia, and the Internet. In addition, USCO's strobe environments heralded new media art.

== Members ==
The founding members of USCO were poet Gerd Stern, electronic technician Michael Callahan, and ex-Pop art painter Steve Durkee (a.k.a. Stephen Durkee, later known as Nooruddeen Durkee). Along with photographer/weaver Judi Stern and sculptor/photographer Barbara Durkee, this core group became USCO. Barbara Durkee (later known as Asha Greer) ran the group's Intermedia Gallery. Judi Stern stated of her fellow members, "We dreamed collectively."

Among USCO's other members were the filmmaker and video artist Jud Yalkut. Yalkut created several films for USCO events in the mid-sixties, some in collaboration with USCO members, including Turn, Turn, Turn (for which USCO did the soundtrack), Ghost Rev, Diffraction Film, and Down By the Riverside. Yalkut works can be found in The Experimental Television Center Collection.

Stewart Brand, although not a formal member of the group, maintained a close relationship with USCO and was considered a peripheral member who played a major role in connecting countercultural networks with groups of researchers in the developing cyberculture. Other peripheral members included Lois Brand, California sculptor and painter Dion Wright, who went on to curate art at the Brotherhood of Eternal Love's Mystic Arts World, tie-dye artist Bob Dacey, and light artist/architect Paul F. Williams, the founder and architect of the Gate Hill Cooperative.

== California and New York background (1948–1963) ==
Gerd Stern was a German Jewish refugee who lived in the San Francisco Bay Area starting in 1948. Stern's background in the Bay Area Beat community grew out of his involvement with Pacifica radio station KPFA in Berkeley, where he met Lew Hill, Allen Ginsberg, Harry Partch, Henry Jacobs, Michael McClure, and Harry Smith. Stern and Hill collaborated on a poetry series for KPFA, with Wallace Stevens, Alan Watts, and Grace Clements, giving Stern the opportunity to use a wire recorder for the first time. Stern stated, "I was always interested in sound and the preserving of sound."

Michael Callahan was technical director of the San Francisco Tape Music Center when he met Stern in 1963 through the SF Tape Music Center's Morton Subotnick via Michael McClure. By 1963 Callahan was purchasing surplus IBM computers to use the parts for customized kinetic art. Callahan's experience working at the SF Tape Music Center taught him how to make do with whatever technology he could scrounge and build, due to lack of funds.

Steve Durkee, raised in New York, studied art at Columbia University. By the time he graduated in 1960 he was living in New York City as a renowned Pop artist and was a friend of Robert Indiana, but became ambivalent about Pop aesthetics a few years later. Around this time he and Stewart Brand, a lieutenant photographer in the U.S. Army, became friends. Durkee was included in a 1962 Art News feature on Pop art titled "The New American Sign Painters," and Callahan later explained that "Pop was part of Gerd's and Steve's attraction to each other."

== History and works (1964–1968) ==
=== USCO formation in New York ===
In 1964 Steve and Barbara Durkee bought an old church to use as a studio, located in Garnerville, Rockland County, New York in the Hudson Valley. After doing several performances in the Bay Area, Gerd and Judi Stern performed at several college campuses en route to New York in late 1964. The Sterns moved to Woodstock, New York near Garnerville, and arranged to have Callahan join them. Callahan moved in with the Sterns in Woodstock, and then the three moved into the church with the Durkees in 1965.

Steve Durkee started making Super 8 movies, and the group began experimenting with him to develop image banks to Stern and Callahan's performances. As Stern explains, "We did electronic music, mostly meditational in nature, and before long we stopped doing the performances as individuals. Gerd Stern stated, "Without our names, we decided to call ourselves 'USCO', the company of Us, because we were anonymous artists." Callahan stated they came up with the name USCO, "Company of US," to create something more inclusive than using their individual names; it was also a way of "bringing people together in an ad-hoc living arrangement." Living not too far from the Hitchcock Estate in Millbrook, New York, they were invited to visit the communal Millbrook group; they then became involved with Timothy Leary, Richard Alpert (later Ram Dass), and Ralph Metzner.

The USCO group collaborated with artists, engineers, poets, and filmmakers. Influenced by media theorist Marshall McLuhan, USCO used stroboscopes, oscilloscopes, projectors, closed-circuit television, computerized control systems, and audiotapes in their "multi-channel media mix" performances. They often reused and repurposed technology from surplus parts. To underline the community character of the project, USCO used the phrase "We are all one". They mixed film, tapes, slides, light, kinetic sculpture, and live actors in audiovisual performances in New York City, the San Francisco Bay Area, and at university campuses across the United States. Judi Stern and Barbara Durkee developed innovative techniques for silk-screening USCO posters.

=== Verbal American Landscape/Contact ===
Callahan stated:

Our work was really drawn from McLuhan. We looked at McLuhan as the theoretician–and we were the practitioners...We had a mission to bring about public awareness of the impact that all this instantaneous communication was having and was going to have–to attempt to be prepared for it and to change it if necessary. Prior to Gerd Stern's move to New York, while still in the San Francisco Bay Area, he began to project slides of words found on street signs, forming a poetry collage later known as Verbal American Landscape. After invited to give a poetry reading at the San Francisco Museum of Art, Stern instead staged a two-night performance in November 1963 titled Contact Is the Only Love, which involved sixty-four performers. The slides were shot by Stewart Brand. Callahan (in his late teens) assisted with audio, using equipment borrowed from the San Francisco Tape Music Center. Stern and Callahan created a four-channel mix of conversation, announcements, and popular music by simultaneously playing, mixing, and switching four pre-recorded tapes and live cut-ups of radio.

Contact Is the Only Love evolved out of Verbal American Landscape. Stern and Callahan built an octagonal kinetic sculpture for the show, seven feet in diameter. It featured flashing neon lights, loudspeakers, amplifiers, and tape loops. In the center were painted signs with words such as "Go," "Merge," and "Enter with Caution."

Stern described the performance:

We had transparent isolation booths onstage in which each of them--there were four people all together--you know, Herb Caen, Allen Ginsberg, et cetera, et cetera--we were able to broadcast and switch the signals from the various booths onto a series of speakers. In the meantime, we were projecting a series of slides which came from the Verbal American Landscape. Those had been chosen by me--I didn't do the photography; Ivan and Stewart Brand did the photography. We borrowed some closed-circuit television equipment, so there were television images. We were able to switch the whole thing. There were people in costume--it was a very elaborate affair.

At the museum, M. C. Richards gave Stern her copy of John Cage's manuscript of McLuhan's Understanding Media, which Stern described as a report that McLuhan had written for the National Association of Educational Broadcasters (NAEB) while still in Canada, and then had turned into Understanding Media with very little, if any, editing. Stern recalled, "I read it, and it was a revelation; I understood immediately that his perceptions were seminal for my development. Particularly things like his statement that what you need to do is pay attention to the effect rather than the content."

Stern and Callahan were then invited to Vancouver, by a University of British Columbia gallery director who had also been at the San Francisco Museum of Art show, to do a performance with a lecture by McLuhan. The gallery director had noted the inclusion of McLuhan's ideas in the San Francisco performance, from a quote by McLuhan in the performance handout.

=== Psychedelic Explorations and Expanded Cinema ===
In early 1965 USCO became interested in replicating the psychedelic experience through sensory overload. USCO collaborated in July 1965 with Leary and Alpert's Castalia Foundation, a precursor to the League for Spiritual Discovery, to reproduce the LSD experience in an "audio-olfactory-visual alteration of consciousness" psychedelic art event in New York City. They reproduced the LSD experience in an event titled Psychedelic Explorations at the Psychedelic Theatre (the New Theatre in New York City). During one part of the event, while Leary lectured about psychedelics, USCO played a recording of Artaud screaming. A 1965 review of the show for The Nation by Howard Junker described USCO's event as an attempt "to stimulate multiple levels of consciousness by audio-visual bombardment."

In November and December 1965, filmmaker Jonas Mekas curated the New Cinema Festival (later referred to as the Expanded Film Festival) at the Filmmakers Cinematheque in New York City. The festival featured two nights of an USCO collaboration with Carolee Schneemann, as well as other emerging psychedelic light show artists. Program Manager John Brockman, who coined the term intermedia, helped create the festival as a series of multimedia productions in which participants combined cinema images and projectors with live actions and music. According to Gerd Stern, USCO was asked to participate because "they thought that our multimedia performances were kind of simulations of psychedelic experiences." Callahan explained USCO "took incandescent lamps out of slide projectors, and replaced them with intense strobe bulbs, so the projected image itself would flash on the screen."

In addition to USCO, participants in Mekas' New Cinema Festival (Expanded Film Festival) included Andy Warhol with a pre-Exploding Plastic Inevitable, Angus Maclise with members of the Velvet Underground, and La Monte Young and Marian Zazeela's Theatre of Eternal Music with John Cale and Tony Conrad. Other participants included well-known and emerging figures such as:

- Roberts Blossom
- Stan Brakhage
- Trisha Brown
- Ken Dewey
- Ed Emshwiller
- Al Hansen
- Dick Higgins
- Ken Jacobs
- Jerry Jofen
- Alfred Leslie
- Claes Oldenburg
- ONCE Group
- Nam June Paik
- Robert Rauschenberg
- Larry Rivers
- Beverly Schmidt
- Jack Smith
- Don Snyder
- Elaine Summers
- Aldo Tambellini
- John Vaccaro
- Stan Vanderbeek
- Robert Whitman

Mekas presented another multimedia event by USCO the following month, for a week in January 1966. Titled Hubbub, the event was promoted in the Village Voice in an ad that described it as "Expanded Cinema! Psychedelic Cinema! Media Mix! Marshall McLuhan! Timothy Leary! Film, oscilloscopes, stroboscopes, computerized, kinetic and live images. A visual feast." Mekas, in his Village Voice column of spring 1966, interviewed Steve Durkee about USCO's use of strobe lights. Mekas asked, "What is the strobe light all about?," and Durkee replied, "Strobe is the digital trip." USCO's strobe environments, which relied on electronic modulation of fluorescent tubes, invoked the more complex emerging technology of the digital computer. Mekas also wrote about USCO in a 1966 review of their Riverside Museum show, comparing their work to the Exploding Plastic Inevitable and stating USCO went after the mystical experience in a more conscious way.

USCO became a client of Nina Graboi's Third Force Lecture Bureau in early 1966. Graboi became director of the League for Spiritual Discovery's New York Center, which she co-founded with Leary, later that year. Back in San Francisco, Stewart Brand co-produced the Trips Festival with Ramon Sender and Ken Kesey in January 1966.

=== The World ===
USCO participated in, and helped design and produce, New York DJ Murray the K's psychedelic multimedia event The World, which took place in an abandoned Long Island airplane hangar and was dubbed the first discothèque. The April 1966 event was negotiated by John Brockman, who had previously included USCO in the Expanded Film Festival. USCO used around twenty to thirty slides with one of the first video projectors to project superimposed images and 16mm film onto the crowd; Callahan built a large-scale programmer to control the slide machines. USCO included experimental films by Jud Yalkut and Stan Vanderbeek, as well as graphics with words such as "Act" "Slit," and "Is." They also utilized closed-circuit television technology, with three cameras projecting the stage and floor on a super sized screen. Music acts that performed included The Young Rascals, The Hollies, Del Shannon, The Isley Brothers, and Mitch Ryder and the Detroit Wheels. The World was featured on the cover of Life magazine in May 1966.

=== Further expansion ===
USCO's leftist politics were expressed in terms of relations rather than direct political action; they thought they were "beyond politics." Judi Stern didn't see a separation, explaining, "Most of our work was involved in two things: Changing consciousness...and changing the world." For example, USCO added to their slide mix sympathetic photographs of people in Vietnam, due to the disturbance USCO felt about the Vietnam War. Brand, on the other hand, thought USCO's work had "zero political elements."

In 1966 USCO exhibited at the Riverside Museum in New York City and the Van Abbemuseum in Eindhoven, Netherlands. Brand lived at the church for two months while helping the group prepare for the Riverside Museum exhibit.

At the end of 1966 Steve and Barbara Durkee left Garnerville, and lived with Richard Alpert (later known as Ram Dass). For a short time period, Steve Durkee lectured with Alpert on "LSD: Illusion or Reality?" before Alpert left the U.S. for study in India.

In 1967 the Durkees formed the Lama Foundation in San Cristobal, New Mexico north of Taos with Jonathan Altman, and assistance from Alpert. They created a spiritual community on land purchased by Altman, with its main structure built with others in 1968 in the shape of a dome. Barbara Durkee stated, "We came to get away from the conservative world that was pretty tight and boxed-in, non-diverse and not very spiritual." At the time, Lama was one of approximately thirty communes in Northern New Mexico.

After the Durkees' departure, the other members of USCO in New York continued to produce and exhibit work under the USCO name through 1968. During the late 1960s, USCO exhibited at the Montreal Museum of Art (1967), Walker Art Center (1967), Brooklyn Museum (1968), and Whitney Museum of American Art (1968).

== Post-USCO (1969 to present) ==
Gerd Stern was offered an Associate in Education faculty position at Harvard University and moved with Callahan to Cambridge, Massachusetts, where they used USCO equipment to begin their own company Intermedia Systems Corporation in cooperation with a group from Harvard Business School. Stern and Callahan co-founded Intermedia Systems Corporation in 1969, the year the company handled some management and administrative details for the Woodstock festival. Intermedia Systems Corporation made pioneering hardware to control audiovisual programming. In the 1970s, Intermedia Systems Corporation produced multimedia art internationally. Callahan worked at Harvard University from 1977 until 1994, at the Carpenter Center for Visual Arts. He and his wife Adrienne co-founded Museum Technology Source in 1990. The company, based in Winchester, Massachusetts initially made electronic devices that allowed museum patrons to use video and interactive exhibits.

In 1969 Stewart Brand connected Steve Durkee with Douglas Engelbart’s Augmentation Research Center (ARC) at Stanford University and the development of early Internet culture. Around the same time, the Durkees helped Ram Dass with Be Here Now, which was published by the Lama Foundation in 1971 and became a best-seller. Its original title was From Bindu to Ojas, with illustrations by Lama community residents.

In 2005 Gerd Stern and Callahan worked together on an USCO retrospective at Anthology Film Archives.

In 2015 the Walker Art Center in Minneapolis, Minnesota included four major USCO works in their exhibit Hippie Modernism: The Struggle Toward Utopia.

In 2015 Seton Hall University featured a solo exhibition of USCO in the Walsh Gallery WhenThen curated by Jeanne Brasile

In 2016, the Garnerville church was listed on the National Register of Historic Places.

In 2019, the National Gallery of Art in Washington, D.C. organized an USCO program, USCO - Films, Performance, and Conversation with 1960s Multimedia Pioneers, curated by Paige Rozanski.
