= Nina Graboi =

New Age spiritual leader

- Nina Graboi circa 1990s
- Born: Gusti Schreyer; December 8, 1918; Vienna, Austria
- Died: December 13, 1999 (aged 81); Santa Cruz, California, U.S.
- Citizenship: American
- Occupations: Theater director, translator, artist, spiritual teacher, author
- Spouse: 1940–66 Michel Graboi
- Children: 2

Nina Graboi (December 8, 1918 – December 13, 1999) was a Holocaust survivor, artist, writer, spiritual seeker, philosopher, and influential figure in the sixties psychedelic movement. After fleeing the Nazis in Europe and spending three months in a detention camp in North Africa, she and her husband came to United States as refugees. As a close friend and colleague of Timothy Leary's and Richard Alpert's (Ram Dass), she was co-founder and director of the League for Spiritual Discovery's New York Center during the psychedelic era. The center was the first LSD-based meditation center in Manhattan. She also worked closely with Jean Houston, Abraham Maslow, Stanley Krippner, and Alan Watts.

== Early life ==
Born Jewish in Vienna, Austria in 1918 as Gusti Schreyer, and brought up in the thriving Jewish community of Leopoldstadt district, she fled the Nazis in the late 1930s and lived/worked as a refugee in London, England. While in Antwerp, Belgium on an extended visit, she married Jewish scarfmaker and Kishinev refugee Michel Graboi, whose father had been killed in the Kishinev pogrom. Many European Jews who sought a safe haven from Nazi persecution, including the Grabois, had difficulty with the United States' restrictive immigration quotas and the complicated, demanding requirements for obtaining visas. In an attempt to immigrate to America after finally obtaining a visa, the Grabois fled to France and set sail on the Wyoming freighter. Along with other Jewish refugees on the ship, the Grabois were detained in Casablanca, Morocco, then controlled by Vichy France, and sent to the Oued Zem detention camp in French Morocco. The implementation of anti-Jewish laws passed by the Vichy regime was not as extreme in Morocco.

After making it to America in 1941 on the steamer Guinee – with the help of family who had previously immigrated to the U.S., the Joint Distribution Committee, and the Hebrew Immigrant Aid Society – Gusti changed her name to Nina. The Grabois settled in New York State and had two children.

Nina Graboi's sister-in-law was artist Greta Loebl.

== Pre-psychedelic background ==
Dissatisfied with her life in Long Island as a society hostess, in the 1950s Graboi plunged into the study of esoteric subjects and became an avid practitioner of meditation, while also running a theater group. As she learned about comparative religion, she became more interested in Buddhism and Hinduism. Her private studies continued through the early 1960s.

After learning about Walter Pahnke's 1962 Good Friday Experiment, in which theology students were given psilocybin as part of psychedelic research at Harvard University under the supervision of Leary and Alpert, Graboi longed to experience what the divinity students had experienced. She realized there was more to these drugs than the media had let people know, and it was the first time she had heard of an experiment with exceptional states of consciousness. In early 1965, Graboi went to a seminar given by a Tibetan Buddhist teacher, and joined a weekly spiritual group led by Virginia Glenn with participants Stanley Krippner, Jean Houston, and Ida Rolf. Glenn helped birth the Human Potential Movement.

In early 1966 Graboi's translation of Jacques Audiberti's anti-war play Les Patients was used in an Off-Broadway production directed by Eugene Lion. With Lion's encouragement Graboi founded The Third Force Lecture Bureau, which promoted and presented speakers in New York City – her clients included Alan Watts, Ira Progoff, USCO, Yoko Ono, Charles Tart, Paul Krassner, and Peter Stafford. Glenn introduced Graboi to Timothy Leary and Larry Bogart at one of Leary's press conferences, a few months after Leary (by this point a former lecturer at Harvard University in Clinical Psychology), had been arrested in December 1965 for possession of marijuana. Bogart was doing public relations for Leary, and through Bogart's suggestion Graboi rented an office across from his at United Nations Plaza. While working there, Bogart introduced Graboi to Richard Alpert (later Ram Dass) and Ralph Metzner.

== Millbrook and the psychedelic counterculture ==
Graboi's breakthrough came in 1966 at age 47 at Millbrook, Timothy Leary's and Richard Alpert's communal estate in upstate New York, after she left her husband. She and Leary had developed a close friendship in 1966 after Graboi gave him her paper Evolution in Search of a New Breed of Man. Graboi frequently spent time at Millbrook with a group gathered around Leary and Alpert to study the mind-expanding effects of LSD. Her first psychedelic trip there was at the Meditation House. Leary announced the Millbrook community had incorporated as a religious organization named The League for Spiritual Discovery in New York State. Although the Millbrook group viewed psychedelics as a primary key to the mystical experience, they continued to search for non-drug ways to reach it.

Graboi also became involved with the Bay Area counterculture. While visiting Alan Watts on his Sausalito houseboat in 1966 with Virginia Glenn, during a week-long LSD conference in San Francisco, Graboi took marijuana in the company of Watts. She and Watts were taken to a party in Marin by Paul Lee. Lee - one of the founding editors of the Psychedelic Review along with Leary - spoke about the party at the conference in a talk titled "Psychedelic Style." The Grateful Dead had thrown the party, with Owsley Stanley handing out his acid to anyone who wanted it. At the time, Lee was also an assistant professor of philosophy at University of California, Santa Cruz.

Graboi and Leary became collaborators in the American psychedelic movement. Graboi co-founded the Center for the League of Spiritual Discovery in a Greenwich Village storefront with Leary in September 1966, and became its director after Leary asked Graboi to head it. The nonprofit organization, influenced by Leary's writings, operated to help and educate people engaged in exploring the potential of psychedelic consciousness. Graboi accepted the position as director to disseminate information about the use and misuse of psychedelics, in order to minimize their ill effects. LSD use became illegal in California in October 1966. Leary, Alpert, and Graboi gave free weekly talks at the center and at other Manhattan locations in 1967. The center became an important part of New York's counterculture. Around the end of 1967/early 1968, the League for Spiritual Discovery was closed down after Leary left Millbrook, and the New York Center for the League of Spiritual Discovery was abandoned shortly after Graboi left her position as director.

In 1968 LSD was added to the list of Schedule 1 substances, which made it illegal to possess, manufacture, or use for any purpose in the United States. In 1969 Graboi moved to Woodstock, a few months before the Woodstock festival, and opened a boutique where she sold her crafts. She founded the Woodstock Transformation Center, and taught New Age-related classes.

Graboi moved to Santa Cruz, California in 1979, where she worked for University of California, Santa Cruz mathematics professor Ralph Abraham. She also gave talks in Santa Cruz and at conferences on the relationship between the psychedelic experience and the spiritual quest. She wrote her autobiography, One Foot in the Future, in 1991. Terence McKenna described it as "an extraordinary tale of humor and hope." Graboi died at age 81 from lung cancer.

Graboi wrote, "We must learn to treasure the unity in our diversity, or we are lost. But it's best to start with Buddhism-the only religion that never caused blood to be shed. Ultimately, I hope, all religious dogma will be replaced by direct, personal experience... The main benefit I derived from the psychedelics is that they taught me that 'I' am not my body but an evolving consciousness, clothed temporarily in a body."
