= Barbara Durkee =

American artist

- Born: April 20, 1935; Los Angeles
- Died: January 7, 2022
- Other names: Asha Greer, Barbara von Briesen
- Website: asha-greer.com

Barbara Durkee, also known as Asha Greer, (1935–2022) was an American artist, visionary founder, and spiritual teacher/leader. She is known for co-founding in 1968 the Lama Foundation, an ongoing intentional Spiritual community north of Taos, NM, and for being a Murshida (senior teacher) in the Ruhaniat order of universal Sufism. She often referred to herself as a "Bufi," following multiple spiritual paths that included universal Sufism and various strains of Buddhism.

She is also known for co-founding the artist collective USCO (Us Company) in New York..

== Artistic Work ==
An example of Barbara Durkee's work with USCO is "Spheres-Time (Tabernacle Painting" (1965) in the National Gallery of Art.

She also did artistic design work and production on the original edition of the Ram Dass book Be Here Now, which was produced by the Lama Foundation.

Also, she created a set of 65 commercially accessible meditation cards, which many of her Sufi students have found useful for inspiration and centering.

Her silk screen studio continues as the Lama Foundation Prayer Flag Shop.

== Family ==
She was born Barbara von Breisen April 20, 1935 in Los Angeles, California. Her parents were Alice Henry and Hans von Briesen. Barbara attended Stanford University and earned a bachelor's degree in International Relations.

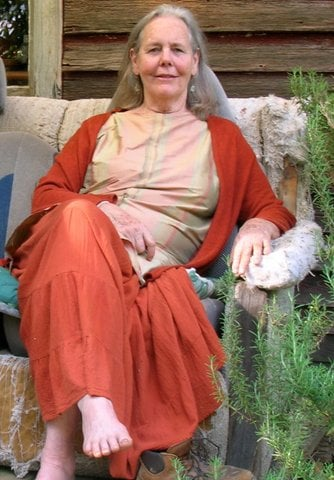
Asha Greer, at home in Batesville, April 20, 2021

After marrying fellow artist Stephen Durkee, the couple decided in 1967 to move to New Mexico with their young daughter Dakota. Their goal was to escape a perceived lack of spiritual atmosphere in the cities, and they dreamed of establishing a spiritual community.

While living for 12 years at Lama Foundation, they had 3 more daughters: Shanti, Aurora, and Savitri Durkee. The youngest, Savitri D, co-leads (with husband "Rev. Billy") a New York-based guerilla theatre community, the Church of Stop Shopping.

In the early 1990's, she changed her name to Asha Greer and separated from her husband, who had converted to Islamic Sufism and as an Islamic Sufi initiate, leader, teacher and author changed his name to Abdullah Nooruddeen Durkee. Also, along with several other leaders in the Sufi Ruhaniat International, Asha at that time relocated to the exurbs of Charlottesville, Virginia. There, she attended the University of Virginia and earned a registered nursing degree.

== Other Work ==
As a Ruhaniat murshida, Asha taught meditation and spiritual transformation and was a senior leader of the Dances of Universal Peace. Together with fellow Ruhaniat leader Hakim Saul-uddin Barodofsky, or on her own, she conducted Sufi and Dance retreats throughout the U.S. and in Mexico and the Middle East.

Asha was a Japanese tea master. She operated a school of the tea ceremony in her home, as Heartwood Tea School. Her teaching emphasized discovering that a sufficiently centered performance of the ceremony eliminates the usual separation between worldly life and the spiritual.

At UVA, Asha was an oncology nurse for 25 years. She also did women's support work at FOCUS. Her experiences in these pursuits led to her co-founding Hospice of the Piedmont.

== Death ==
Murshida Asha Greer died on January 7, 2022, in Virginia.
