= Loebl =

Loebl or Löbl is a surname of Hebrew origin literally meaning "little heart". It consists of the word "heart" (לב, Loeb, Löb) in Hebrew plus Yiddish diminutive suffix "-l". When Jews were required to Germanize their names, "Loeb + l" was converted into "Herz + l", i.e., Herzl

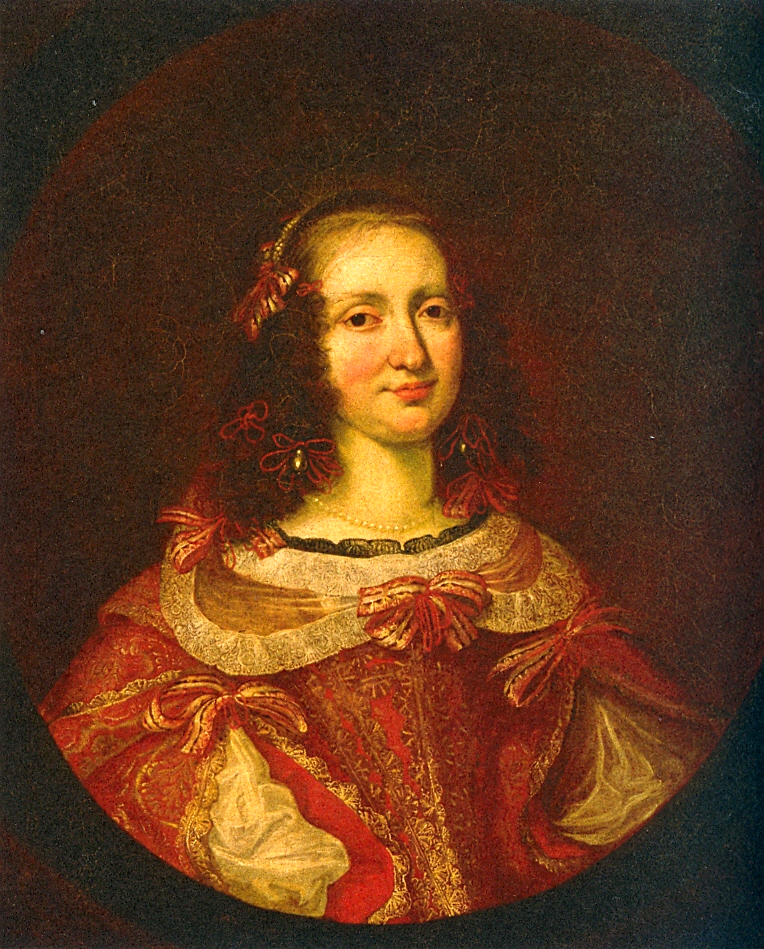
Maria Sofia Löbl was wife of Nikola Zrinski, Ban (Viceroy) of Croatia

The surname may refer to:

- Herbert Loebl (1923–2013), British businessman
- Greta Loebl (1917–2005), born Greta Loebl, Austrian-American, Jewish jewelry designer and painter
- Eugen Loebl (1907–1987), a former Czechoslovak official who survived the Slánský trial
