= New Buffalo (commune) =

Former hippie commune

Coordinates: 36.533°N 105.685°W

New Buffalo was a hippie commune in Arroyo Hondo, New Mexico. It was co-founded by poets Max Finstein and Rick Klein in 1968 and was in operation for numerous years. It served as Dennis Hopper's inspiration for the hippie commune depicted in the movie Easy Rider.

== History ==
New Buffalo was an experiment in self-sufficient living. It was named after the animal to represent the founders’ vision to be a source of sustenance for its people, just like buffalo (or American bison) were to Plains Indians.

Rick Klein purchased the 103-acre commune in 1967 with inheritance money. Its population quickly grew and people began living in tepees on its outskirts. Residents grew food and, at different times, had dairy goats, dairy cows, and chickens. Full self-sufficiency was never achieved and some residents would take on seasonal jobs.

The commune had high turnover, including much of its founding group of about a dozen. Co-founder Max Finstein left after about a year and later started a new commune called The Reality Construction Company. Author Iris Keltz first visited in 1968, witnessing communal living, and felt it had changed by 1969 as communes went mainstream.

=== Easy Rider ===
New Buffalo inspired the hippie commune scene in the movie. Hopper originally intended to film there, but commune members rejected the idea and the scene was filmed in Malibu, California, area instead. A related scene, however, was filmed near the commune at Manby Hot Springs.

=== Books ===
Arthur Kopecky, who lived at the commune for eight years, wrote two books about his life there. Books by Iris Keltz and Lisa Law feature New Buffalo prominently.

=== Notable visitors ===
- Ram Dass
- Dennis Hopper
- Lisa Law (also a resident)
- Timothy Leary

== See also ==
- Arroyo Hondo, Taos County, New Mexico
- Counterculture of the 1960s – Anti-establishment cultural phenomenon
- Drop City – Abandoned rural hippie commune in Colorado, US
- Hog Farm – Intentional community
- Hippie – 1960s subculture
- Intentional community – Planned, socially cohesive, residential community
- Tawapa – Former squatted settlement
