= Lama Foundation =

Commune and retreat in northern New Mexico

Coordinates: 36.6357°N 105.6005°W

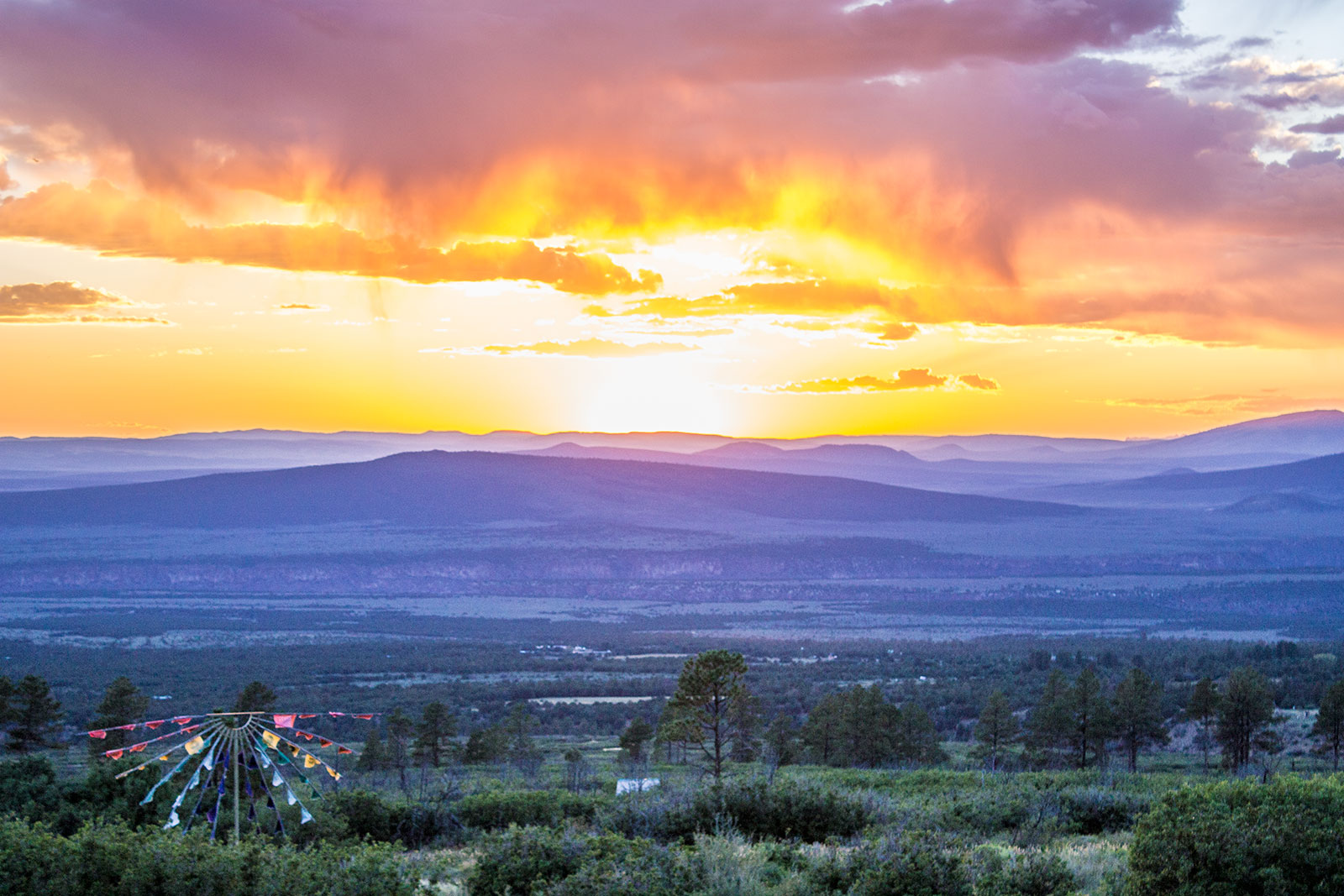
The view from Lama to the west

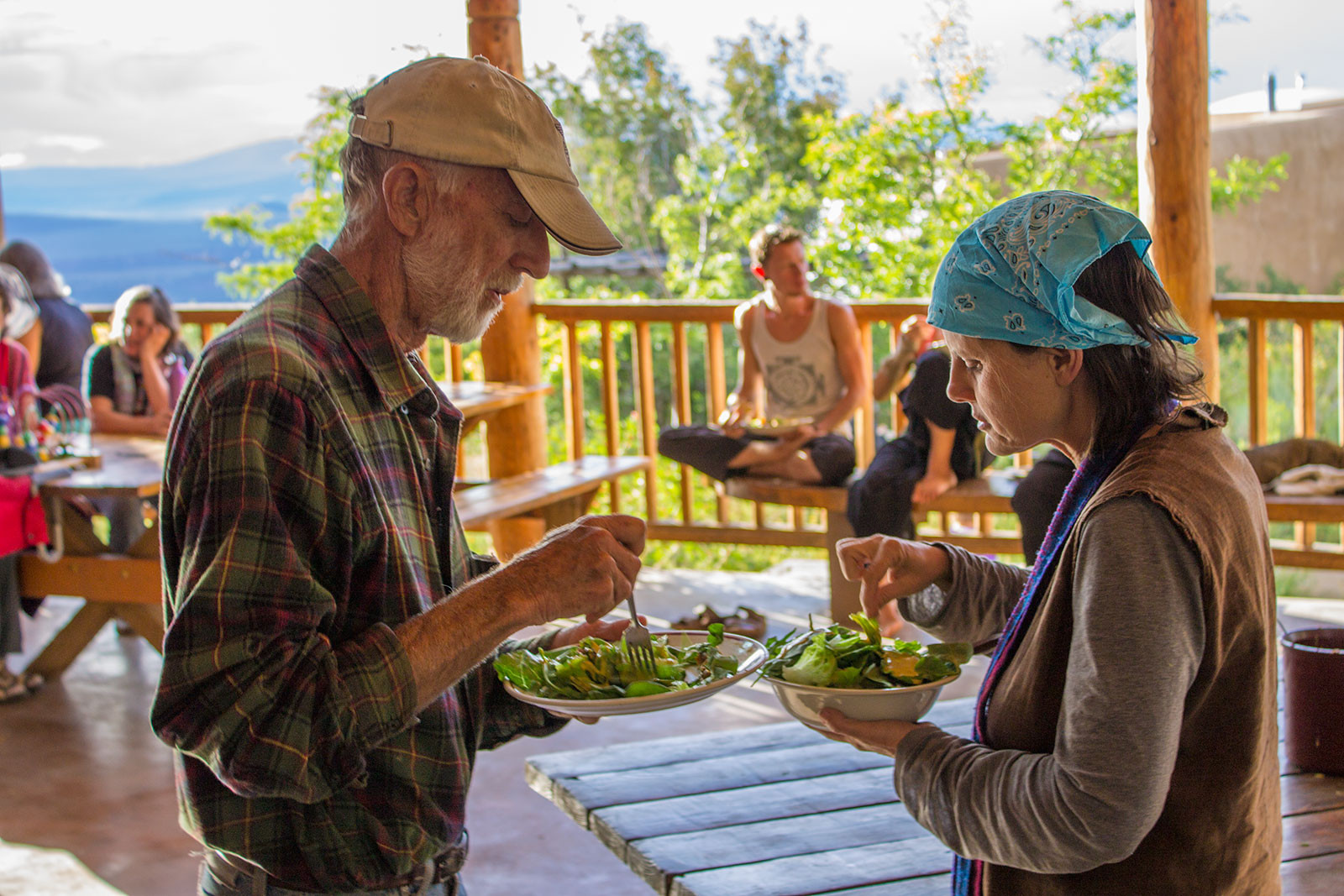
Sharing a meal at Lama

Lama Foundation is a spiritual community founded in 1967, located in the Sangre de Cristo Mountains of northern New Mexico, seventeen miles north of Taos. The original commune was co-founded by Barbara Durkee (now known as Asha Greer or Asha von Briesen), Stephen Durkee (aka Steve Durkee, later known as Nooruddeen Durkee), and Jonathan Altman.

== Mission ==
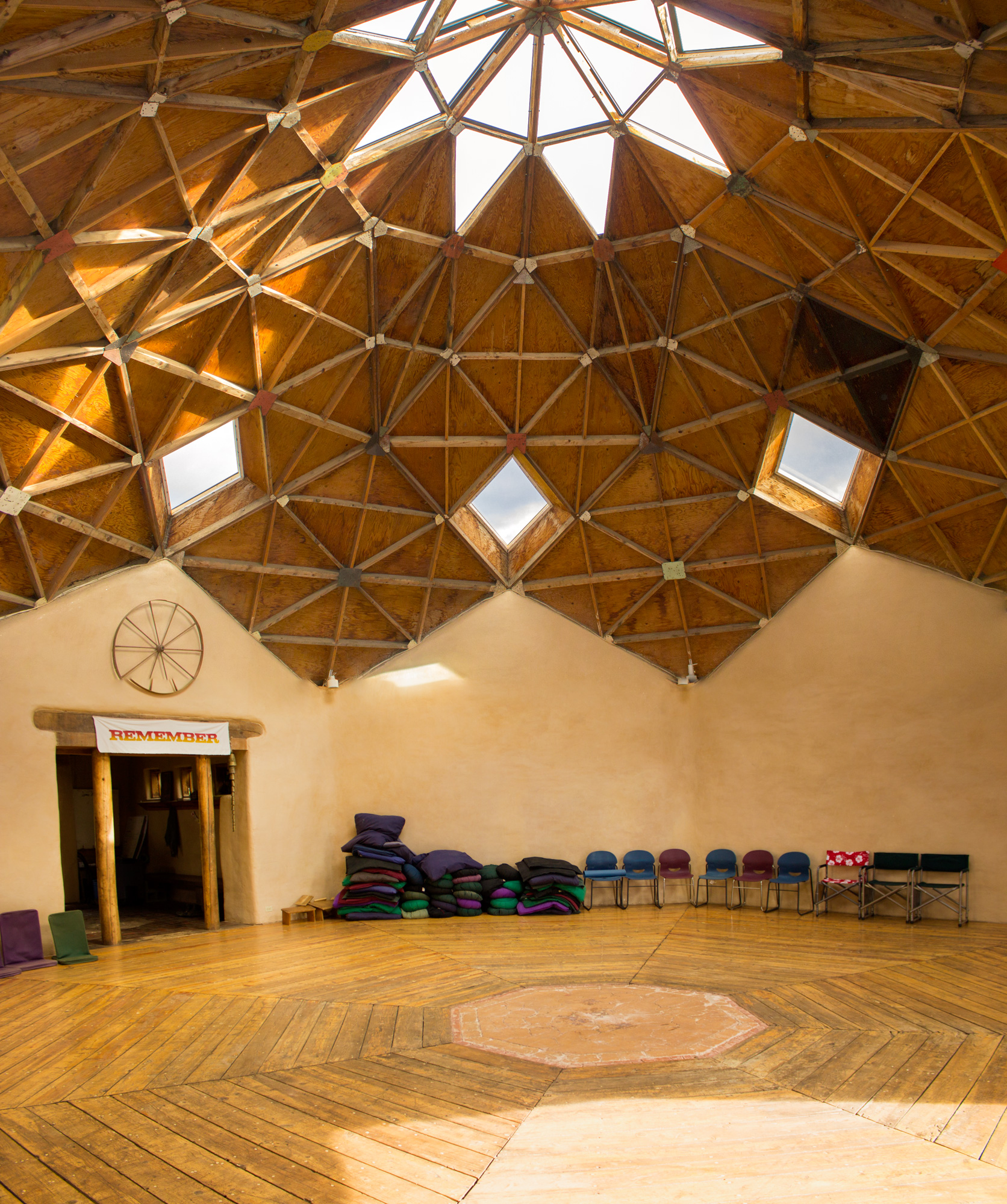
Inside of the Dome at Lama Foundation

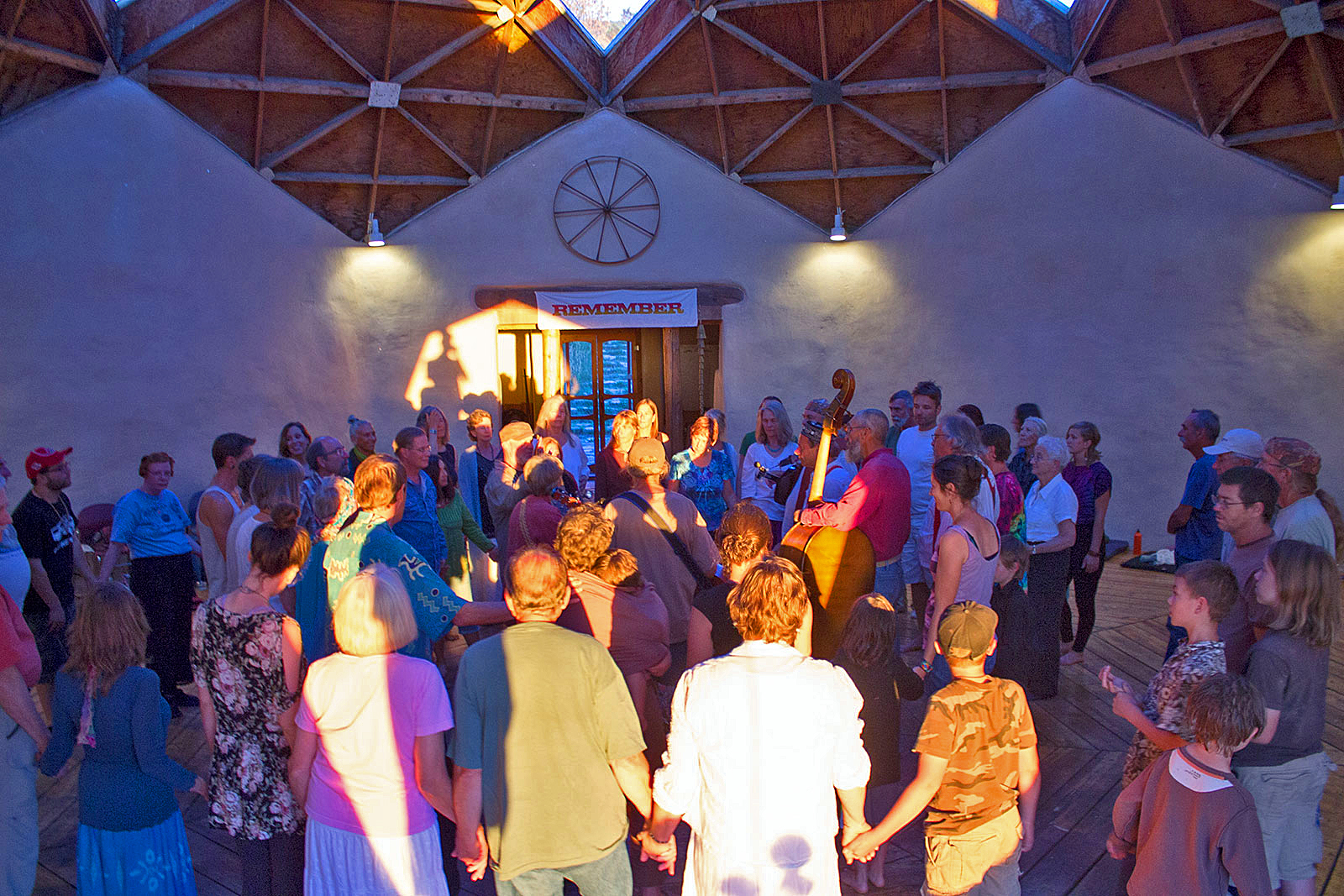
Dances of Universal Peace in the Dome

Lama Foundation's original mission was "dedicated to the awakening of consciousness, spiritual practice with respect for all traditions, service, and stewardship of the land." Now the Lama Board of Trustees is active, ensuring that traditions are "transmitted". Lama engages in two seasons: summer "open" season and winter "closed" season.

First and foremost, Lama is a spiritual community dedicated to the "meeting of the ways." A core practice of its mission is to provide a residence for people of all spiritual and religious (and non-religious) traditions to live together and explore the common, and uncommon, ground of their spiritual practices and identities within the community. This is a year-round exploration. Residents live at Lama anywhere from one to several years. Differing from many spiritually focused communities, there are no permanent residents, directors, or teachers. In addition to leading a semi-monastic life, the residents are responsible for the primary care of the foundation.

In the summer, Lama is also home to a larger group of summer stewards, or interns, who are invited into the community life for shorter periods of time. At this time, Lama welcomes visitors for as little as a day and as long as a few months. Other "Lama Beans" who live nearby often join for day events and other visits. Everyone on the land is invited into the daily practice of meditation, morning "tuning" or meeting, and weekly events like Shabbat, Zikr, Heart Club, and a variety of scheduled and impromptu events. In particular, Lama has held a Shabbat service for over 35 years, which draws people from all over northern New Mexico, including travelers.

Lama is also a retreat center. Summer retreats are offered by a variety of teachers, and this is Lama's primary income source, providing 50% of Lama's annual operating budget. These programs range from meditation retreats, spiritual teachings, youth programs, permaculture certification, and more.

In addition to the spiritual side of Lama, there is a strong emphasis on permaculture and right relationship to the land. Gardens and good land practices help maintain an environment in keeping with the surrounding Carson National Forest. Lama is off-grid, providing all power from solar technology, and all water is sourced from a spring on the land. Buildings are sited thoughtfully and built with natural building techniques. Food waste is composted, and all waste, as much as possible, is kept from landfills. Choices, from what to eat to whether to have gasoline-powered vehicles, are routinely considered from this perspective.

Lama holds visitors' days, Shabbat, and other events for the surrounding community, which includes Taos and much of northern New Mexico. At these gatherings, thousands of meals are served free of charge throughout the course of a summer. Thanksgiving and other events at Lama provide a place for people without family nearby to go for community at times when they need it.

Lama has no affiliation with any religious organization, though it maintains relationships with many. In particular, Lama has had significant relationships with the Taos Pueblo, the Hanuman Temple, Contemplative Outreach, the Church of Conscious Harmony, Ram Dass, Neem Karoli Baba, Murshid Samuel Lewis, Rabbi Zalman Schachter-Shalomi, Father Thomas Keating, St. Benedict's Monastery, the Sufi Ruhaniat International, and many others. Lama has itself become a spiritual home for thousands of individuals, in the neighborhood, across the country, and internationally.

== History ==
The Lama Foundation was founded in 1967 by Barbara Durkee (now known as Asha Greer or Asha von Briesen and Nooruddeen Durkee), Stephen Durkee, and Jonathan Altman. The Durkees had been in the communal media arts collective USCO in Rockland County, New York, before moving to New Mexico. Lama began with Altman's purchase of 100 acres (0.40 km^{2}) of land adjacent to federal forested land, and continues today as a place for people to visit and live. Construction of the first buildings began in 1968. The following year, the foundation was incorporated as an "educational, religious and scientific" organization.

It was one of almost thirty communes (intentional communities) established in the region around that time, and one of the most well-known, along with Morningstar East, Reality Construction Company, the Hog Farm, New Buffalo, and The Family. By 1973, the vast majority of these communities had closed, but the Lama Foundation was able to continue because it had more structure and discipline than most others. The community has gone through several stages, ranging from the search for spiritual enlightenment to a more recent focus on permaculture and natural building.

Ram Dass was a friend of the founders, and he stayed at the Lama Foundation as a guest when he returned to America from India. During his visit, he presented the Durkees with a manuscript he had written, entitled From Bindu to Ojas. The community's residents edited, illustrated, and laid out the text, which ultimately became a huge commercial hit when published under the name Be Here Now. Ram Dass also held seminars at the Foundation. So did other spiritual leaders, such as Samuel L. Lewis, who was buried there after his death in 1971. In 1974 the Lama Foundation published The Yellow Book, the first book of the silent master yogi Baba Hari Dass, a collection of aphorisms in question/answer format about life topics.

Proceeds from the sales of Be Here Now helped to fund the Lama Foundation in subsequent years, as did other publications, craftwork projects such as prayer flags, and a few government grants.

== Architecture ==
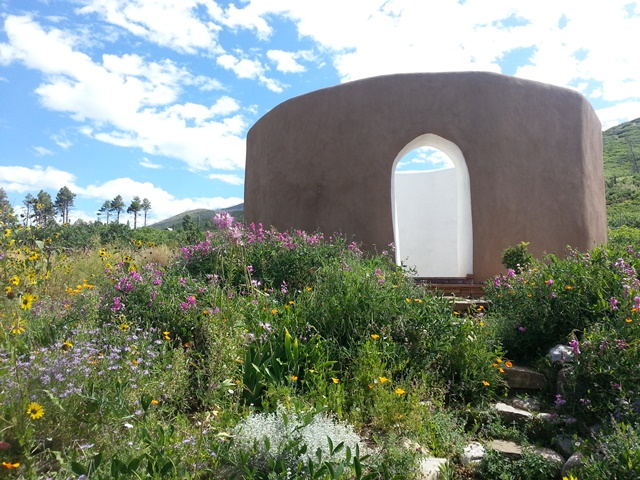
The ISC Sky Temple in summer

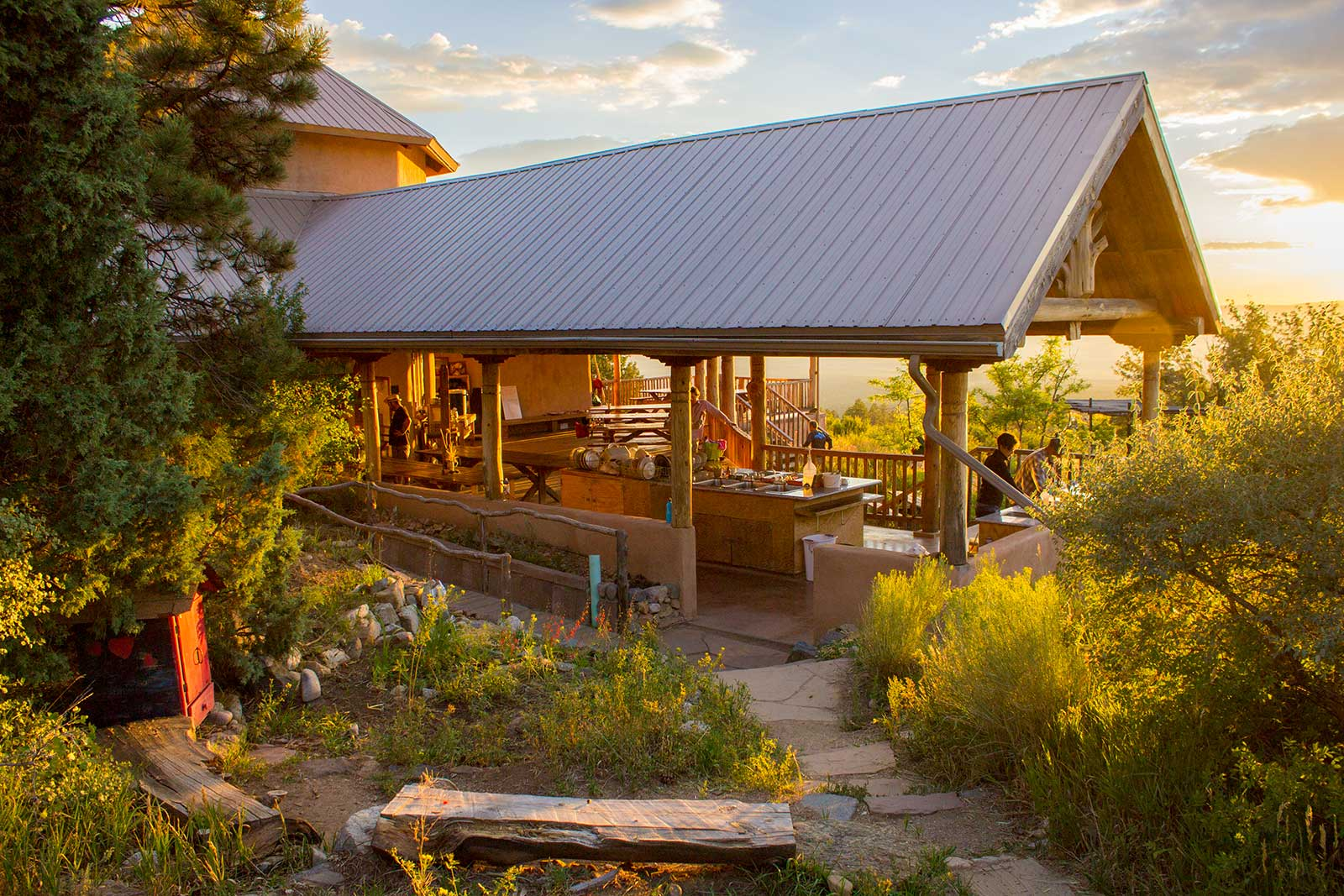
Community Center at sunset

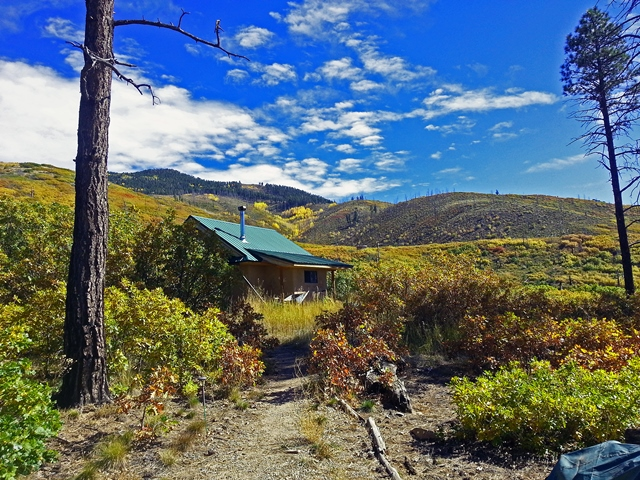
The Teacher's House in the fall

Most of the buildings are straw bale, adobe brick, and straw clay structures and were built by residents of Lama or participants in natural building workshops. Common structures were adobe with vigas and latillas, or a-frames – with names like "Muffin House", "Tower House", and "Orange Room". A massive forest fire in 1996 destroyed approximately 20 of the community's buildings, though the central complex survived.

In 1969, Lama published Steve Baer's Dome Cookbook, and in 1972 published his reprint of Buckminster Fuller's 4D.

During its early days, the Lama Foundation was an early innovator within New Mexico in greenhouse design, constructing a so-called "pit greenhouse" with added heat storage to reflect biosphere principles. It permitted year-round cultivation of the community's crops.

Since 2012, CU Boulder's Environmental Design Program has been designing and building small off-grid cabins on the Foundation to accommodate a wider range of guests as well as increased seasonal visitation capabilities. The cabins serve as a practical design build experience for the students of the University of Colorado. Currently there are three student designed cabins that utilize sustainable architecture and cost effective construction.

== Religious practices ==
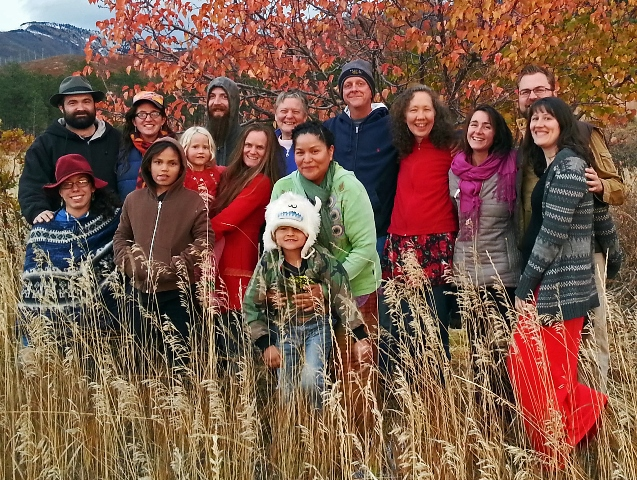
The resident circle in 2015

The Lama Foundation is notable among communal religious movements in that it embraced an eclectic approach to spiritual discovery, rather than depending strictly on the teachings and authority of a single charismatic leader or discipline. In this respect, it was similar to prior movements such as Gerald Heard's Trabuco College. This individual autonomy is also displayed by the relative lack of communality in its living arrangements, compared to other groups founded at the same time.

== Education ==
Roots and Wings Charter School, affiliated with the Questa Independent Schools school district, is in Lama.

== Current status ==
The meals at Lama are primarily vegetarian, they maintain a separate storage and cooking facility for meat products as meat is not allowed to be cooked indoors. The electrical power comes predominantly from solar panels but is supplemented by propane as necessary.

== Sources ==
- Banner, Lois W (1998). Finding Fran: History and Memory in the Lives of Two Women. New York: Columbia University Press. ISBN 0231112165. OCLC 39079202.
- Dass, Baba Hari (1974). The Yellow Book: The Sayings of Baba Hari Dass. San Cristobal, NM: The Lama Foundation.
- Oliver, Anna Cypra (2004). Assembling My Father: A Daughter's Detective Story. Boston: Houghton Mifflin. ISBN 0618341528. OCLC 53919506.
- Reilly, Sean; O'Reilly, James; O'Reilly, Tim (2002). The Road Within: True Stories of Transformation and the Soul. Berkeley, CA: Travelers' Tales. ISBN 1885211848. OCLC 50638546.
- Sadler, Simon (2012). "Diagrams of Countercultural Architecture". Design and Culture. 4 (3): 345–367. doi:10.2752/175470812X13361292229195. S2CID 146915330.
- Stern, Gerd (2001). "Oral History: From Beat Scene Poet to Psychedelic Multimedia Artist in San Francisco and Beyond, 1948-1978". The Bancroft Library.
- Sutton, Robert (2005). Modern American Communes: A Dictionary. Westport, CT: Greenwood Press. ISBN 0313321817. OCLC 56894538.
- Veysey, Laurence R (1978). The Communal Experience: Anarchist and Mystical Communities in Twentieth-Century America. Chicago: University of Chicago Press. ISBN 0226854582. OCLC 4653689.
