= Gerd Stern =

Gerd Jacob Stern (October 12, 1928 – February 17, 2025) was an American poet and artist.

== Early life and education ==
Born Gerd Jacob Stern in the Saar region, then under a League of Nations mandate, he emigrated with his family to New York City in 1935 following the Saar's incorporation into Nazi Germany. His father, Otto Stern, operated a cheese import business.

Stern attended the Bronx High School of Science and City College of New York briefly, initially intending to study zoology. He later spent a short period at Black Mountain College in North Carolina, where he studied poetry and was influenced by Buckminster Fuller and John Cage. It was through Cage that Stern encountered Marshall McLuhan's theories, reading an early manuscript of McLuhan's influential work Understanding Media.

== Career ==
In the late 1940s through the 1960s, Stern divided his time between New York City and California's Bay Area, actively participating in countercultural circles. He met Allen Ginsberg at the Columbia Presbyterian Psychiatric Institute, assisted in the publication of William Burroughs's pseudonymous first novel Junkie at Ace Books, and managed Maya Angelou during her early career as a cabaret performer. He also wrote travel articles for Playboy and contributed to the establishment of Berkeley's listener-supported radio station, KPFA-FM.

In the 1940s, he became friends with poets John Hoffman and Philip Lamantia. He told Ron Martinetti of American Legends website about Lamantia: "We had similar feelings about the world and were both pot smokers. Plus there was the Jewish Italian thing, the natural affinity there is for each other. Philip was a very engaging guy. He didn’t harp on his background, the mythology of his connection to [Andre] Breton. He was not impressed. Others were."

In the early 1960s, Stern co-founded the artists' collective USCO ("US Company") with Michael Callahan and Stephen Durkee. Members of USCO included photographer and weaver Judi Stern (his third wife), filmmaker Jud Yalkut, and Stewart Brand, who later created the Whole Earth Catalog.

By the 1970s, as the popularity of multimedia art declined, Stern established another collective, Intermedia Systems Corporation, and transitioned into academia, teaching at Harvard University and the University of California, Santa Cruz.

In the early 2000s, Stern's work received renewed attention with retrospectives at institutions such as Anthology Film Archives and the Whitney Museum of American Art, and his collaborative media works were exhibited in Europe and the United States.

Late in life, he contributed to cultural projects such as Anne LeBaron's 2024 opera "LSD: Huxley's Last Trip," co-compiled a poetry anthology focused on Jewish holidays, and participated in monthly poetry-science discussions in New York City. Stern also led the family cheese-import business in New Jersey for a period and served as president of the American Cheese Society.

== Personal life ==
Stern was married four times, with each marriage ending in divorce. He had multiple children and grandchildren, although three sons and one grandson predeceased him.
