= You Can Be Anyone This Time Around =

Studio album by Timothy Leary
- Released: April 1970
- Genres: Psychedelic, spoken word
- Length: 30:05

Professional ratings
Review scores
Source	Rating
Allmusic	3/5 stars

You Can Be Anyone This Time Around is an album by Timothy Leary released in April 1970. The disc features three "raps" by Leary backed with psychedelic music. The purpose of the album was to raise funds for Leary's political candidacy for Governor of California.

The album includes musical contributions from Jimi Hendrix, Stephen Stills, John Sebastian, and Buddy Miles recorded during an all-night jam session at the Record Plant.

The title track and "What Do You Turn On When You Turn On" both feature sampling of music by other artists, including The Beatles, The Rolling Stones, and Ravi Shankar. This is one of the earliest known examples of sampling on a commercial record.

== Track listing ==
All tracks written by Timothy Leary.

Side one
No.	Title	Length
1.	"Live And Let Live"	14:16

Side two
No.	Title	Length
1.	"You Can Be Anyone This Time Around"	9:12
2.	"What Do You Turn On When You Turn On"	6:41
Total length:		30:05

== Personnel ==
- Timothy Leary – spoken word, writer
- Jimi Hendrix – bass guitar
- Buddy Miles – drums
- John Sebastian – guitar
- Stephen Stills – guitar
- Intermedia Systems Corporation – production
- Stanley Mouse – cover artwork
- Cindy Nelson – package design
- David Greenberg – liner notes
- Jim Marshall — photography
