= Hitchcock Estate =

New York estate

- Former names: Daheim

General information
- Architectural style: Queen Anne
- Location: 45 Hitchcock Lane, Millbrook, NY
- Coordinates: 41.79179°N 73.68517°W
- Year built: 1912

Technical details
- Floor count: 4
- Grounds: 2,300 acres (9.3 km^{2}))

Design and construction
- Architect: Addison Mizner

The Hitchcock Estate is a historic mansion and surrounding grounds in Millbrook, New York, associated with Timothy Leary and the psychedelic movement. It is often referred to in this context as just Millbrook; it is also sometimes called by its original name, Daheim.

The 2,300-acre (9.3 km^{2}) (or 2,500-acre (10 km^{2})) estate was purchased in stages by assembling five farms, beginning in 1889, by German-born acetylene gas mogul Charles F. Dieterich (1836–1927), a founder of Union Carbide. In 1912 Addison Mizner designed the four-story 38-room mansion which Dieterich named "Daheim" ("At home"). Featuring turrets, verandas, and gardens, the late-Victorian mansion has been described architecturally as Queen Anne style or Bavarian Baroque. The estate also featured a large gatehouse, horse stables, and other outbuildings.

Ownership of the estate passed from Dieterich's heirs to oilman Walter C. Teagle and then to the Hitchcock family. Siblings Billy Hitchcock, Tommy Hitchcock III, and Peggy Mellon Hitchcock, heirs to the Mellon fortune (children of Tommy Hitchcock Jr., grandchildren of oilman William Larimer Mellon Sr., and great-great-grandchildren of Mellon fortune founder Thomas Mellon), who were familiar with Timothy Leary's work and Leary personally, gave the estate over for use by Leary in 1963. Peggy Hitchcock was director of Timothy Leary and Richard Alpert's International Federation for Internal Freedom (IFIF)'s New York branch, and her brother Billy rented the estate to IFIF (later re-named the Castalia Foundation).

Leary and the group he gathered around him lived at the estate and performed research into psychedelics there. The Castalia Foundation also hosted weekend retreats on the estate where people paid to undergo the psychedelic experience without drugs, through meditation, yoga, and group therapy sessions. Leary, Alpert, and Ralph Metzner wrote the 1964 book The Psychedelic Experience at the mansion. People who lived at the estate included James Tambimuttu, Richard Alpert, Arthur Kleps, and Maynard Ferguson, while the numerous visitors and guests included R. D. Laing, Alan Watts, Allen Ginsberg, Charles Mingus, Helen Merrill, Jonas Mekas, and Ivy League academics. Ken Kesey and the Merry Pranksters visited in their bus Furthur but were unable to meet with Leary. Nina Graboi described Millbrook as "a cross between a country club, a madhouse, a research institute, a monastery, and a Fellini movie set. When you entered you were greeted by a sign that asked you to 'kindly check your esteemed ego at the door.'"

During Leary's residence at the mansion (1963–1968) the culture and ambiance there evolved from scholarly research into psychedelics to a more party-oriented atmosphere, exacerbated by an increasing stream of visitors, some youthful and of the hippie persuasion. The mansion was the target of drug raids. Leary and his group were evicted in 1968, and Leary moved to California.

The mansion was later boarded up and fell into disrepair, including structural degradation. But after about two decades of effort it is (as of 2016) habitable although not modernized. It is still owned by the Hitchcock family. In 2003, Hudsonia Institute scientists discovered on the estate a circumneutral bog lake (a spring fed calcareous body of water that usually supports the vegetation of both acidic bogs and calcareous marshes), rare in the area and worthy of preservation.

In April 2024, Peggy Hitchcock, who was considered to be the family's scion, died. In the time following her death, Peggy was also acknowledged to have been the one who persuaded her brothers to let Leary rent a room at the mansion. It was reported that her brother Tommy, and also a half brother Alexander McLaughlin, died in 2023. As of 2024, the estate remained for sale at an asking price of $65 million.

== See also ==
- William Westerfeld House
