= Nooruddeen Durkee =

American Islamic scholar (1938-2020)

Abdullah Nooruddeen Durkee
- Born: Stephen Durkee; 1938; Warwick, New York, United States
- Died: 13 September 2020 (aged 81–82)
- Spouse: Noura Durkee

Philosophical work
- Era: Modern era
- Region: North America
- School: Sufi

Abdullah Nooruddeen Durkee (born Stephen Durkee) was a Muslim scholar, thinker, author, translator, and the Khalifah (successor) for North America of the Shadhdhuli School for Tranquility of Being and the Illumination of Hearts, Green Mountain Branch. Nooruddeen Durkee became a Muslim in his early thirties in Al-Quds, Jerusalem. He was one of the co-founders of Lama Foundation and founder of Dar al-Islam Foundation.

His major contributions were in the area of education, specifically in the realm of teaching, reading, writing, and reciting of Qur'anic Arabic, which grew out of his work in the translation and transliteration of the sacred texts of the Shadhdhuliyyah and finally the Qur'an. One of his main contributions was the development of a transliteration of the Qur'an, which enabled non-Arabic speakers to understand and recite Quranic Arabic. Additionally, he served as a Khateeb and an imam for various Muslim communities on the Eastern coast of the United States.

Nooruddeen was granted an 'ijaza in Islamic Calling (da'wah) by Umar Abdullah of Comoros, an 'ijaza in Islamic Introspection and Observation (muraqabah) by Seyed Ali Ashraf of Dhaka, Jeddahand Cambridge, and an 'ijaza in the Teaching, Propagation of Islam and the Nourishment of the Murids by Muhammad al-Jamal ar-Rif'aiof al-Quds ash-Shareef. In the professional world, he was granted a master's degree [M.Arch] in Islamic Building in 1983 by Dr. Hasan Fathy of the Institute of Appropriate Technology in Kuwait.

He maintained a Zawiya at the Islamic Study Center in Charlottesville, Virginia, which is also the location of The Green Mountain School, the third school Nooruddeen founded. Until his death in 2020, he lived on Green Mountain Farm in Keene, Virginia with his wife Noura Durkee.

== Biography ==
Abdullah Nooruddeen Durkee was born Stephen Durkee in 1938 in Warwick, New York. He grew up with his grandmother, a devout Catholic, and herbalist, in Greenwood Lake, New York. During his childhood, he periodically visited New York City, where his mother taught school, his father was in the hotel business, and his grandfather worked as a ship chandler and cargo consolidator for the North Atlantic convoys.

From 1944 to 1952, he was a student at Corpus Christi, a Catholic grade school in New York City with broad interfaith exposure, after which he studied at religious and secular high schools in New York.

From 1957 to 1960 he studied with Robert Lowe, Professor of the Fine and Applied Arts in the Teachers’ College, at Columbia University.

From 1960 to 1966 he worked as an artist and creator of environments in New York City and San Francisco. His paintings are now in various private collections as well as the Guggenheim and the Museum of Modern Art, New York City. Durkee founded USCO along with Gerd Stern and Michael Callahan and created the first multimedia light shows. He began a lengthy correspondence with Meher Baba. He traveled and exhibited at universities and museums throughout the northeast and had a large exhibition at the Tibetan Museum in New York City. Articles on his work appeared in various publications such as ArtNews and Life Magazine.

From 1967 to 1970, he initiated the Lama Foundation in New Mexico, which was one of the first centers in North America for Spiritual Realization and Interfaith Studies. During this time he served as Coordinator and Director of Programs and established contact with teachers of many traditions, including Kalu Rinpoche and Zalman Schachter-Shalomi. His first exposure to nominal Sufism was through the writings of Hazrat Inayat Khan and in-person interactions with Murshid Samuel Lewis and Pir Vilayat Inayat Khan. Durkee organized, edited, and produced Ram Dass' book Be Here Now, an international best-seller.

In 1970 and 1971, he coordinated the International Work Camps in the Alps conducted by Pir Vilayat Khan. He also traveled in the desert regions of North America and embarked on excursions to the Indian Subcontinent and Middle East, where he first came into contact with Muslims. He edited Pir Vilayat's book Towards the One.

In 1972, he lived on Jabal Zaytun outside of al-Quds ash-Sharif in Jerusalem, where he embraced Islam at the Madrasah of the Masjid al-'Aqsah. During this period he studied Tasawwuf with Muhammad al-Jamal, Na'ib of the Mufti of al-Quds, Hazim Abu-l-Ghazali of Amman, Jordan, and Abu Mutalib ash-Sharif of al-Khalil, all of whom were sheikhs of the Shadhdhuliyyah Order. He also benefitted from the teaching of Noor-i-Muhammad, a Naqshbandi from Bokhara who lived and taught within the city.

From 1973 to 1976, he designed and built the Intensive Studies Center (also known as the Islamic Sufi Center) in the mountains above San Cristobal, New Mexico. This center, which burned to the ground in a forest fire in the 1990s, contained the first mosque in Northern New Mexico. Through the center, many people learned about Islam for the first time from the perspective of Tasawwuf. Many young American people embraced Islam in this setting and went on to stay at the Center where they learned the rudiments of Islam and began to live as Muslims.

From 1976 to 1979, he lived and studied in Makkah al-Mukarramah in the 'Ashrafiyyah area of al-Jiyad and attended the Markaz al-Lugahat-al-Arabiyyah, Kulliyat ash-Shari'ah, what was then Jami'at Malik 'Abdu-l-'Aziz and is now known as Jami'at Ummu-l-Qurra. During this time, he developed the idea of a Muslim school and community in the United States and began raising funds for the project.

From 1980 to 1988, on the first day of the new Hijri 1400, he was the sole signatory on incorporation papers for the Dar al-Islam Foundation in Abiquiu, New Mexico, which he co-founded in 1979. Nooruddeen Durkee served from 1980 to 1988 as President of Dar al-Islam. During his term, the foundation grew from an idea to a physical reality that, at the time of his leaving office, had assets of $7 million USD, was debt-free, and in full operation, which included a mosque, a school, residences, and small businesses. Its purpose was to add a living, artistic, social, and cultural center for Islam in America. It drew visitors from all over the world, particularly, but not exclusively, among Muslim converts in America. The foundation is still operational and remains debt-free with a limited summer teaching program.

During this period, he also studied Islamic Architecture with world-renowned Islamic architect Dr. Hasan Fathy, who made the original drawings of Dal al-Islam. In 1985, he was awarded the degree of Master of Islamic Architecture by the al-Sabbah Institute of Appropriate Technology in Kuwait.

From 1988 to 1993, after a conference on Islamic Education in Cambridge, England, he moved with his family to Alexandria, Egypt. There, he worked with his spiritual teacher, developed a circle of students, and became deeply involved in the Shadhdhuliyyah. He wrote Orison of Shadhdhuliyyah as well as a second volume on the subject, Origins of the Shadhdhuliyyah. He also began the first work on the Tajwidi Qur'an.

During this same period, he also studied the Shadhdhuliyyah Shari'ah Way for Lovers of Qur'an and Sunnah with Ibrahim Muhammad al-Batawi, who was a Professor of Islamic Philosophy for over 25 years at al-Azhar University in Cairo, Egypt.

In 1986, Nooruddeen was appointed by Ibrahim al-Batawi as his Khalifah in the Western Hemisphere. He also studied the science of Muraqabah (inner contemplation) with the Mujaddidi Naqshabandi Shaykh, Dr. Seyed 'Ali Ashraf, professor of Islamic Education at King Abdu-l-Aziz University in Jeddah, Saudi Arabia and later Professor of Education at the Oxford University in the United Kingdom, who granted him an 'Ijaza to teach Muraqabah. In 1983, he was awarded an 'Ijaza in Islamic Calling (da’wa) from Umar Abdullaah, a Ba'Alawi shaykh from Comoros who served as the Ambassador Plenipotentiary to the Kingdom of Saudi Arabia and the Gulf States in the 1980s and 1990s. In 1999, he was granted an 'Ijaza and given 'Idhn to teach by Muhammad al-Jamal, of the High Council of Sufism in Jerusalem In 2004, was granted a Khilafah by Hazrat Quttubuddin Yar Fardi of the Nizamiyya/Chistiyyah in Rahim Yar Khan, Pakistan, after a series of lectures he gave to large gatherings in the spring of that year.

In 1994, he returned to the United States and settled in Charlottesville, Virginia, where he began working full-time on the Tajwidi Qur'an, which was published in 2003. During this time, he founded the Green Mountain School as a conduit for teaching Qur'an and for the publishing of other books and lectures. He also established the an-Noor Foundation, a non-profit 501(c)(3), specifically for the publication of the Tajiwidi Qur'an and for the propagation of traditional moderate Islam.

== Major contributions ==
=== Books ===
Durkee translated the Tajwidi Qur'an from its original Arabic to English and published it as The Transliterated Tajwidi Qur'an in 2003. It is meant to be a guide for non-Arabic speakers to learn the pronunciation of the original text and to understand some of the meanings of the Quran. The transliteration is based on Mesa and Hart's rules and is placed alongside its Arabic script counterpart. The English appears ayat by ayat under the transliteration. Durkee aimed to make the translation contemporary and understandable while maintaining respect for the original text. Additions or ‘bridges’ in the text, necessary for the sake of English reading, are distinguished by brackets and contain no editorial comment. The volume contains extensive notes and charts on tajwid, the rules for reading Qur'an, and a large index.

Noorudeen began this work in 1994 while living in Alexandria, Egypt, as an aid to non-Arabic readers of the Qur'an. After it was completed in 2000, he sent it to a select group of Arabic scholars, speakers, and readers as well as to a representative cross-section of Muslim readers for further review and correction. This latter stage, coupled with careful revisions of form, layout, and design, took 3 more years. It was printed and bound during Ramadan 2003.

Orisons of the Shadhuliyyah (first published in Alexandria, Egypt in 1991) is the translation from Arabic of three books that deal with the origins of the Shadhdhuli School of Sufism. Two of these books are by the late Shaykh of Azhar, ‘Abdu-l-Haleem Mahmud, and the third is by Dr. Abu-l-Wafa Taftazani, the former vice-regent of Cairo University and the Shaykh ul-Mashaykh of the Turuq as-Suffiyyah of Egypt. Sequentially, these books deal with the lives and teachings of ‘Abu-l-Hasan ash-Shadhdhuli, his Khalifah (successor) Abu-l-‘Abbas al-Mursi and one of his two successors, Ibn ‘Ata’ ‘Illah as-Sakandari.

Origins of the School of the Shadhdhuliyyah is a companion edition to the first volume, Orisons of the Shadhdhuliyyah, and was also published in Alexandria, Egypt in 1991. This volume contains the complete collection in Arabic and the English and Roman transliteration of the ‘Ahzab and ’Awrad of the Shaykh. Nooruddeen translated these passages in collaboration with Dr. Ma’ddawi az-Zirr and then edited and prepared it for publishing during his five-year stay (1989–94) in Alexandria.

=== Organizations ===
Dar al-Islam, Abiquiu, New Mexico

Nooruddeen Durkee co-founded Dar al-Islam, a non-profit educational organization, in 1979. Dar al-Islam was meant to facilitate the growth of accurate and authentic knowledge of Islam among the American people with a commitment to build bridges between American Muslims and non-Muslims. Programs focused not just on information but on the contextual and experiential dynamics of living in a multicultural society. In 1975, while studying at the Markaz al-Lughat al-Arabiyyah in Mecca, Saudi Arabia, Durkee met a businessman and industrialist named Sahl Kabbani who was to become his partner in the endeavor of Dar al-Islam. Kabbani had studied engineering in the United States and was anxious to give something to the country that had contributed to his education. The two of them put together the plan for Dar al-Islam, with Kabbani reportedly contributing $125,000 to the foundation. Other money came from the Riyadh Ladies’ Benevolent Association of Saudi Arabia, from the late King Khalid, and from two of his daughters.

Planned to house 150 families, Dar al-Islam was the first Islamic village in the United States in which residents could live a fully Islamic way of life. American Muslims would be able to engage in daily interactions according to their beliefs, and in manifesting their faith, they would bear witness (da'wah) of Islam to others.

The foundation purchased its first 1,000-acre (4.0 km^{2}) site from Alva Simpson, a well-established rancher along the Chama River, for $1,372,000. The land included the 400-acre (1.6 km^{2}) mesa top, plus 600 acres (2.4 km^{2}) below the mesa – a fertile tract along the Chama. A master plan was drawn up for the community, and the Egyptian architect Hassan Fathy was called in to help.

The Lama Foundation

Durkee founded the Lama Foundation in New Mexico in 1967. It began with the purchase of 100 acres (0.40 km^{2}) of land adjacent to federal forested land and continues to be a place for people to visit and live. Construction of the first buildings began in 1968. The following year, the foundation was incorporated as an “educational, religious, and scientific” organization.

It was one of almost thirty communes established in the region around that time, and one of the most well-known, along with Morningstar East, Reality Construction Company, the Hog Farm, New Buffalo, and The Family. By 1973, the vast majority of these communities had closed.

Ram Dass was a friend of the founders, and he stayed at the Lama Foundation as a guest when he returned to America from India. During his visit, he presented the Durkees with a manuscript he had written, titled From Bindu to Ojas. The community's residents edited, illustrated, and laid out the text, which ultimately became a commercial hit when published under the name Be Here Now. Dass and other spiritual leaders, such as Samuel L. Lewis, also held seminars at the Foundation. Lewis was also buried there after his death in 1971.

== Green Mountain School ==
Founded in 1995, The Green Mountain School is the third school Nooruddeen Durkee founded. The major concentration of the school continues to be the teaching of the Qur'an. The school also serves as a local conduit for the dispersing of zakat and sadaqah. It sponsors a weekly ma'idatu-l-rahmah (table of mercy), which serves orphans and widows from the refugee community, local university students and professors, and others among the poor, recently imprisoned, and broken-hearted to eat together, pray together, make dhikr together, and read Qur'an together. The Green Mountain School, in concert with the An-Noor Foundation, continues to run a prison chaplaincy for both men and women in maximum security state prisons.

== Books ==
- Al Qur'an al Karim with transliteration and translation, 2000
- Peace and Love: Four Essays and an Article, avail. as a reprint, 1992-5
- Ya Seen: The Heart of the Qur'an in Arabic, transliteration and translation
- Love of God, a collection of articles from people of varying religious traditions, the chapter to represent the Muslims, entitled The Love of Allah, published New Delhi, 1994
- The School of the Shadhdhuliyyah, Volume One: Orisons [translated with Ma‘ddawi az-Zirr, edited, transliterated with a long introduction], published in 1992 by The School of the Shadhdhuliyyah.
- A Garden in Flames [the Jerusalem mss] [edited and produced] unpublished
- In the Garden [co-edited and co-produced] 1975, Harmony Books, Crown Publishers
- Toward the One [edited and produced] 1974, Harper Torchbooks, Harper and Row
- Seed [edited and produced] 1973, Harmony Books, Crown Publishers
- Be Here Now [edited and produced] 1970–1971, Lama Foundation, Crown Publishers
- Bindu to Ojas [edited and produced] 1969–1970, Lama Foundation

== Select articles ==
- Muslim / Jewish Dialogue, Paragon House 2000 [contains a paper given at the Muslim/Jewish Dialogue Conference, Cordova, Spain, 1999
- Petals of Light from the Muhammadan Rose, Texas Islamic Press, 1998
- Muslim Christian Dialogue - Promise and Problems, Paragon House, 1998
- The Selling of Sufism, International Sufi conference, San Francisco, 1997
- The Love of Allah [revised edition] Published by Noon Heirographers, Nakhujabad
- Reflections of the Possibilities of Perfection, Proceedings of the International Mawlid Conference, Chicago, 1996
- Recital of Qur'an as a Way to Peace
- 'Islam is Salam published in Voices from World Religions, ISPK, Delhi, India, 1993
- Making Peace With the Earth in the Light of Surrender
- Acts of Peace, Inner & Outer
- The Love of Allah, written for inter-religious and intra-religious conferences, have been gathered in a book entitled Peace and Love: Four Essays and an Article, 1995
- Dar al Islam, ‘Mimar: Architecture and Development’, Autumn, 1987
- Islamic Architecture for Schools in ‘Muslim Education Quarterly’, 1986
- Hassan Fathy in America, VIA; Journal of School of Architecture MIT, 1985

== Lectures and conferences ==
- Renewing the Family and building a Culture of World Peace, Washington, DC, 2000. Organised by the Interreligious and International Federation for World Peace
- United Nations Millennium Peace Summit for Religious and Spiritual Leaders, New York 2000. Organised by the United Nations
- Journey to Salaam, A Culture of Peace for the Muslim Community, Washington, 2000. Organised by Muslim Peace Fellowship and Assoc. of Muslim Social Scientists
- Second International Islamic Conference, Chicago 2000, organised by the Nation of Islam, [three talks]
- Mawlid an-Nabi, Columbia South Carolina, June 2000 organised by Islamic Studies and Research Association
- Jewish-Muslim Encounters, Cordoba, Spain August 1999, Organised by the Inter Religious Federation for World Peace
- Sayyidina Muhammad: The Mercy to All the Worlds, June 1999 Columbia, SC organised by Islamic Studies and Research Association
- Unity Conference, Washington DC, September 1998 [three lectures]
- First International Islamic Conference, Chicago, 1998, [two talks]
- The Universal Spirit of the Holy Qur'an and the State of the Ummah, Oct. 1998, Columbia, SC organised by Islamic Studies and Research Institute
- Sufi Symposium, San Francisco, 1997 California, Paper: Truth in Advertising, The Selling of Sufism.
- Sufi Symposium, San Francisco, 1996 California, Paper: Recital of Qur'an as a Spiritual Practice
- Bluefield Meeting on Qur'anic Studies, Sept 96 Paper: Transliteration and Translation of Qur'an.
- International Mawlid an-Nabi [S] Conference, Chicago, Illinois, USA, August 1995
- Paper: Manifestations of the Shadowless Presence

International Federation for World Peace, 1995 Congress, Seoul, Korea, August 1995

- Paper: Possibilities of Perfection considered from Light of Islam
- Problems and Challenges in Islamic and Christian Dialogue, University of Waterloo, Rension College for Religious Studies, Waterloo, Ontario Canada, May 1995
- Paper: Some Personal Thoughts on Muslim Christian Dialogue.
- Islam in Practice in the Modern World
- Unitarian conference center, Charlottesville, VA 1995
- Perspectives on Islamic Sufism, Piedmont Community College, faculty seminar, 1995
- Islamic Architecture; What it Is and What it Isn't Piedmont Community College, faculty seminar, 1995
- Stories from Qur'an Fifteen Ramadan TV shows for the Arab World, Cairo, 1994
- Islam in Focus, Twenty talks on Islam for TV presentation in the Arab World, Cairo, 1993
- Hasan Fathy and Appropriate Architecture, American Cultural Center, Alexandria, 1992
- The Nature & Practice of Islam: Now, talk given in Batesville, Virginia, USA, June 1991
- The Nature of Islam: Outer and Inner, Alexandria, Egypt, 1990
- The Life After This Life, seven 2 hour talks given in Alexandria, Egypt, 1989
- Islam in Practice, Ghost Ranch, New Mexico USA. 1987 held under the auspices of the Presbyterian Synod for Reconciliation between Christians and Muslims.

Participant and speaker

- Inter-Faith Dialogues sponsored by: World Council of Religions: “Spirituality and Practice”, Vancouver, Canada, 1987
- “Making Peace with the Earth”, New York, New York, 1991
- “Peace in Practice”, Paris, 1991
- “Ways to World Peace”, Seoul, Korea, 1992
- Participant and Speaker at Muslim World Intra-Faith Dialogues: "Islam and the Family”, Istanbul, Turkey, 1990
- “Islamic Law”, Istanbul, Turkey, 1988
- “Peace in Islam”, Casablanca, Morocco, 1989
- “Islamic Education”, Casablanca, Morocco, 1988
- National Delegate to the Sixth International Conference on Muslim Education, Cambridge, UK, 1990
- National Delegate to the Fifth International Conference on Muslim Education, Cairo, Egypt, 1988

== See also ==
- Daniel Moore (poet)
- List of Sufis
