= Jud Yalkut =

American artist (1938–2013)

Jud Yalkut (/dʒʌd jælkʌt/;1938–2013) was an experimental film and video maker and intermedia artist.

== Career ==
Yalkut attended McGill University, Montreal, where he studied poetry, before returning to his place of birth, New York, to take up film-making. While at McGill, Yalkut and Leonard Cohen were fraternity brothers.

=== New York ===
In 1965 Yalkut became resident film-maker for USCO ('The Company of Us', a media arts collective). Yalkut created the following films for USCO events in the mid-sixties, some in collaboration with USCO members: Turn, Turn, Turn (USCO did the soundtrack), Ghost Rev, Diffraction Film, and Down By the Riverside.

Yalkut became interested in psychedelics, and produced a short film in 1966 titled D.M.T. The film featured slides by artist Jackie Cassen, choreography/dancing by Mary McKay, and the voice of Ralph Metzner reading from Timothy Leary's book Psychedelic Prayers: And Other Meditations.

In 1966 Yalkut started collaborating with Nam June Paik, a working partnership that would continue into the 1970s. Together, Yalkut and Paik produced hybrid film-video works that combined moving image technologies, electronic manipulations, performance and installation. These works include Videotape Study No. 3 (1967–69), Beatles Electroniques (1966–72) and Cinema Metaphysique (1966–72).

As well as Paik, Yalkut worked with many other New York-based visual and performance artists. For example, in 1966 Yalkut created Moondial Film, an experimental film that documented an "electromedia" happening by Aldo Tambellini. In 1967, Yalkut made a film of the Japanese artist Yayoi Kusama, Kusama’s Self-Obliteration, using multiple dissolves and additional superimpositions. In 1968, Yalkut collaborated with the dancer and choreographer Trisha Brown, contributing a film to the dance, Planes, for projection onto the performance space. The film included found aerial footage of New York City, rockets launching and microscopic imagery.

During his time in New York, Yalkut organized film programs for Charlotte Moorman's New York Avant Garde Festivals. He also taught film-making courses at New York University, School of Visual Arts, and the Millennium Film Workshop.

=== Dayton ===
In 1973, Yalkut left New York and started a film and video program at Wright State University, Dayton, Ohio.

He was one of the founders of Dayton Visual Arts Center. He taught at Sinclair Community College in Dayton and at Xavier University in Cincinnati.

== Personal life ==
Jud Yalkut was born in New York City in 1938. In 1973, he moved to Dayton, Ohio, where he lived until his death at the age of 75 in Cincinnati, Ohio on July 23, 2013.

He was married to Peg Rice.

== Notable exhibitions ==
- Dream Reels: VideoFilms and Environments by Jud Yalkut, Whitney Museum of American Art, New York, 2000.
- Jud Yalkut: Visions and Sur-Realities, University of Dayton, Spring 2013 – a career retrospective.

== Accolades ==
In 1968 Kusama’s Self Obliteration, Yalkut's 1967 collaborative film with Yayoi Kusama, won the Fourth International Experimental Film Competition in Belgium.

Yalkut received six Individual Artist Fellowships and three Artist's Project Grants from the Ohio Arts Council. The Montgomery County Arts and Cultural District honoured him with a Master Individual Artist Fellowship and a Lifetime Achievement Fellowship in 2003.

Many of Yalkut's films have been preserved by Anthology Film Archives through grants from the National Film Preservation Foundation.
