= Peggy Mellon Hitchcock =

American heir and psychedelic patron

- Born: June 29, 1933
- Died: April 9, 2024 (aged 90)
- Other name: Peggy Hitchcock
- Known for: Efforts with psychedelic drugs

Margaret "Peggy" Mellon Hitchcock (June 29, 1933 – April 9, 2024) was an American heiress and psychedelic patron.

== Early life and education ==
Margaret Mellon Hitchcock was born on June 29, 1933, in Manhattan as the third of five children in a privileged family. Her mother, Margaret (Mellon) Hitchcock, was the daughter of William Larimer Mellon, a founder of Gulf Oil, and her father, Thomas Hitchcock Jr. served as a lieutenant colonel in World War II before dying in a training accident in England when she was ten. She was educated at the Brearley School in Manhattan, Miss Porter's School in Farmington, Connecticut, and Bryn Mawr College in Pennsylvania.

== Career ==
Hitchcock was influential in the 1960s counterculture scene, notably through her financial support of a summer program in Mexico organized by Timothy Leary and Richard Alpert, referred to by participants as a "psychedelic summer camp." During the rise of Leary's group at Harvard in 1963, Hitchcock's brothers, Billy and Tommy, acquired a 2,500-acre property in Millbrook, New York, leasing a large mansion at a minimal cost to Leary, who converted it into a center for psychedelic research. Hitchcock divided her time between her Park Avenue residence in Manhattan—later referenced in Charles Mingus's song "Peggy's Blue Skylight"—and the Millbrook property, observing key events and visits from notable figures such as Ken Kesey, the Merry Pranksters, and Allen Ginsberg.

Following the fragmentation of the Millbrook community, Hitchcock continued to shape her diverse legacy. She maintained an intermittent relationship with Leary and subsequently began a partnership with journalist Walter Bowart, relocating with him to Arizona. In Arizona, they founded a Sufi spiritual center in the Chiricahua Mountains and married in 1970. Hitchcock also supported Bowart's publishing company, Omen Press, focusing on metaphysical and spiritual literature. The marriage ended in divorce in 1980.

In 1989, Hitchcock met the Dalai Lama in Santa Monica and subsequently embraced Buddhism, actively supporting Tibetan causes. She contributed to Tibet House in Manhattan and founded Arizona Friends of Tibet, an organization hosting teachings by the Dalai Lama and Robert Thurman, a longtime associate. She also served as chair of the board of AUDIT USA, an organization focused on election transparency.

== Personal life ==
At the time of her death, Hitchcock was survived by her daughter Sophia, another daughter Nuria Bowart, stepsons Wolfe and Wythe Bowart, her brother Billy, her sister Louise Stephaich, and three grandchildren; her brother Tommy and half-brother Alexander Laughlin had predeceased her. Her third marriage, to lawyer Larry Weisman, ended in divorce, while her fourth marriage to doctor and saxophonist Allan Bayer was reportedly a happy union until his death in 2007.
