= Greta Loebl =

Austrian-American jewelry designer and painter (1917–2005)

Greta Loebl Schreyer
- Born: Greta Loebl; July 28, 1917
- Died: October 3, 2005 (aged 88)
- Occupations: Jewelry designer and painter

Greta Loebl Schreyer (July 28, 1917 — October 3, 2005), born Greta Loebl, was an Austrian-American, Jewish jewelry designer and painter. She survived the Holocaust and died in New York City.

== Early life ==
Greta Loebl was born in Vienna, Austria and followed in her father's footsteps at 18 to become a master goldsmith. Due to the Nazi occupation of Austria, she and her future husband Oscar Schreyer left the country in September 1938. While in Paris, France, they met a wealthy American who sponsored their affidavit for immigration to the U.S. They stayed in Paris until their visa applications to the U.S. were approved, and they arrived in the U.S. in March 1939. The couple attempted to get visas for their parents but did not succeed, and their parents were all deported to concentration camps – Greta's parents to Theresienstadt, and Oscar's parents to Izbica (and possibly Treblinka). Greta Schreyer's mother was sent to Auschwitz after her husband's death. Oscar Schreyer's sister Nina Graboi (born Gusti Schreyer) survived the Holocaust, and immigrated to New York City with the help of Oscar and Greta.

== Career ==
Greta Schreyer's jewelry design included lapel pins she created to make a living as a newly-arrived immigrant – they became an immediate fashion hit, and were advertised in Vogue, Harper’s Bazaar, and Mademoiselle magazines. From a goldsmith she evolved into an artist and from 1956, the year of Schreyer's first solo exhibition, until her death, her work was displayed in many solo and group exhibitions in the United States, Austria, and Czechoslovakia.

Her paintings and watercolors included symbols of her flight from peril, her dream-world, and her optimism. One series was of burning synagogues in Poland, reflecting the destruction of Polish Jewry by the Nazis. As of her death, her work was in the permanent collections of Brandeis University Library, The Jewish Museum in New York, Museum Haaretz in Tel Aviv, Israel, and The Albertina and The Oesterreichische Galerie-Belvedere Palace in Vienna, Austria.

== Personal life ==
After Oscar Schreyer's death, Greta married her cousin, economist and Vassar College professor Eugen Loebl. She had two daughters, Leslie and Linda, as well as several grandchildren.
