= Intermedia Systems Corporation =

Intermedia Systems Corporation was an American media technology company, co-founded in Cambridge, Massachusetts, in 1969 by Gerd Stern and Michael Callahan. Stern and Callahan had been members of the media art collective USCO in the 1960s when they had lived in Rockland County, New York. Intermedia Systems Corporation produced multimedia art internationally during the 1970s.

== Intermedia Systems Corporation history ==
Gerd Stern was offered an Associate in Education faculty position at Harvard University by Harvard professor George Litwin, a former colleague of Timothy Leary's. Stern moved with Michael Callahan to Cambridge, Massachusetts, where they used USCO equipment to begin their own company in cooperation with Litwin and other behavioral scientists affiliated with Harvard Business School. Stern and Callahan co-founded Intermedia Systems Corporation in 1969, the year the company handled some management and administrative details for the Woodstock festival. Intermedia Systems Corporation made pioneering hardware to control multi-channel audiovisual programming, and in the 1970s produced multimedia art internationally.

Intermedia Systems Corporation's approach to applied research in the arts was featured in Stewart Kranz’s 1974 anthology, Science and Technology in the Arts. Litwin stated in the book, “We are trying to use mixed media—multimedia technology—to create environments that have particular kinds of psychological effects." Stern explained that the interdisciplinary company conducted experiments, and existed in the space between psychology, business, and art.

In 1974 Stern gave a talk on "the present state of communications systems and some possible directions for evolution," at a conference titled "Educational Communication Centers and the Television Arts." The conference was coordinated by Gerald O'Grady, and held at the State University of New York in Albany. Grady was Director of the Center for Media Study at the State University of New York in Buffalo. In addition to pioneers of public television experiments, other presenters included video artists Steina Vasulka, Woody Vasulka, and Ed Emshwiller, as well as composer Joel Chadabe. There was also a demonstration of one of Experimental Television Center's video synthesizers.

Callahan worked at Harvard University from 1977 until 1994, at the Carpenter Center for Visual Arts. He and his wife Adrienne co-founded Museum Technology Source in 1986. The company, based in Massachusetts, initially made electronic devices that allowed museum patrons to use video and interactive exhibits.
