= Manby Hot Springs =

Thermal springs

- Stagecoach Hot Springs
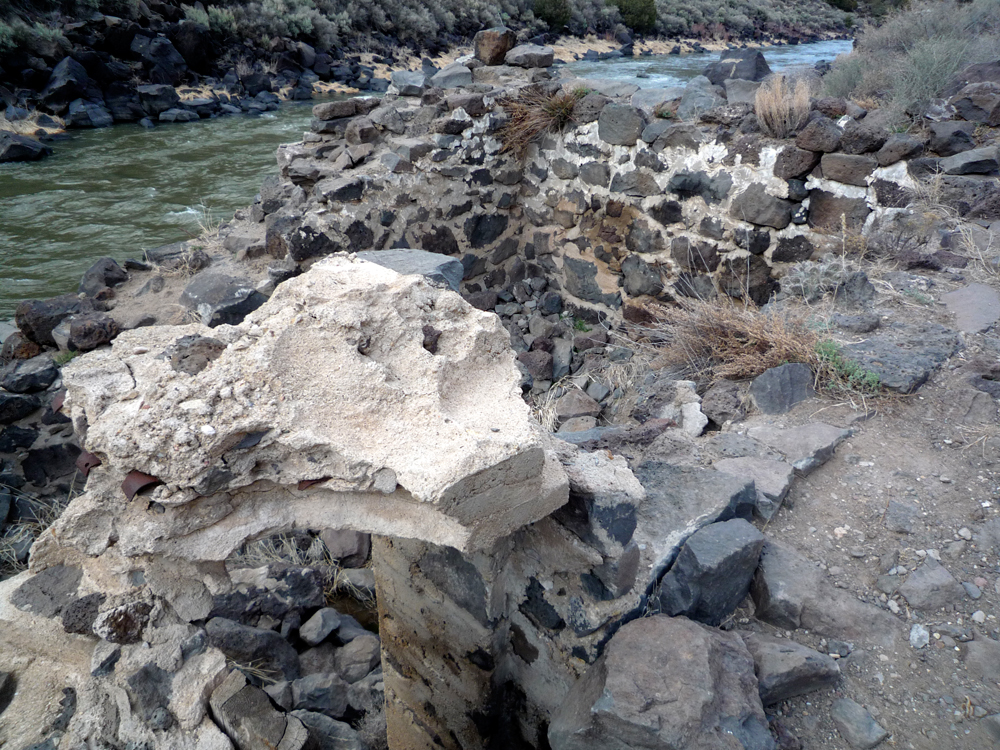
- Manby Hot Spring bathhouse ruins, Rio Grande Gorge
- Interactive map of Manby Hot Springs
- Location: near Arroyo Hondo, New Mexico
- Coordinates: 36°30′48″N 105°43′32″W
- Elevation: 6,500 ft (2,000 m)
- Type: geothermal
- Temperature: 100 °F (38 °C)

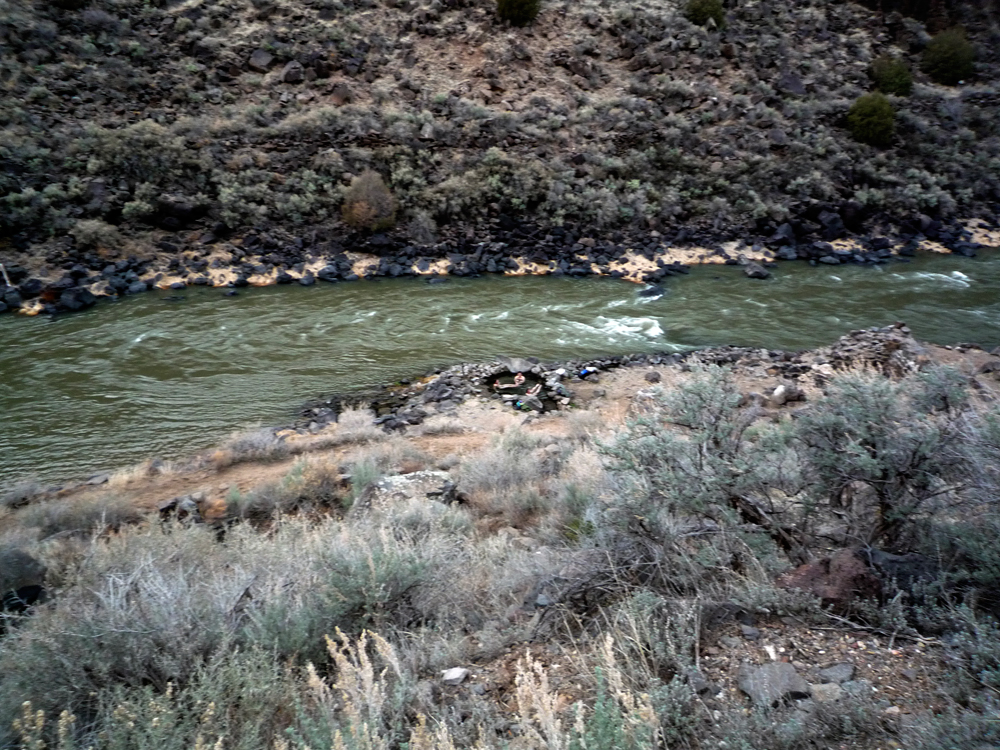
Manby Hot Spring, Rio Grande Gorge

Manby Hot Springs, also known as Stagecoach Hot Springs are thermal springs located near the town of Arroyo Hondo, New Mexico. The springs discharge into three rock pools with sandy bottoms located near the ruins of an old bathhouse and a historical stagecoach stop.

== History ==
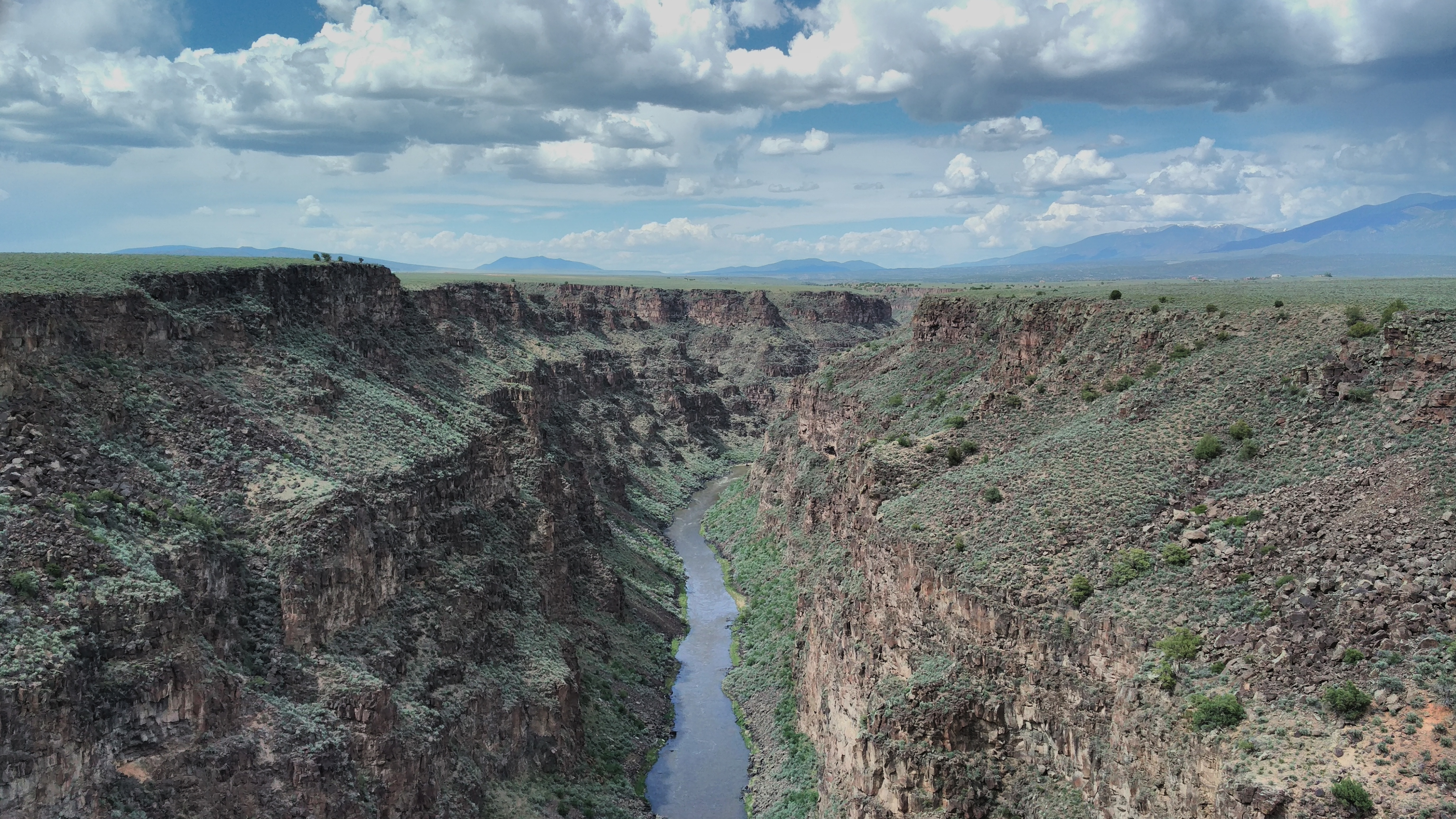
Rio Grande Gorge

The hot springs were used by the Puebloan cultures for hundreds of years prior to the arrival of the Spanish, and knew it by the name Wa-pu-mee meaning "water of long life". The springs later were visited by Spanish explorers in the area, who were searching for the fabled fountain of youth.

In the late 19th century European-Americans began to develop the area. In 1880, the Chili Line (Santa Fe Branch) of the narrow-gauge Denver and Rio Grande Western Railroad began stopping at Taos Junction, and the hot springs became a tourist attraction that was accessible by stagecoach. Shortly thereafter, in the 1890s, two local Taos merchants, Albert Miller and Gerson Gusdorf, built a toll bridge to the springs and charged tourists as well as locals to cross the bridge.

In 1906, British-born traveler Arthur Rochford Manby coerced a claim to the 60,000+ acre Antonio Martínez land grant on which the springs were located. In his biography of Manby, Frank Waters has written that Manby "lied, schemed and stole" to secure the land. Manby was involved in numerous disputes with the locals, and by the early 1900s he went to live out near the springs. In 1922, Manby envisioned a resort, which he planned to name Lost Springs of the Aztec, that would include a luxury hotel with the springs as the centerpiece. All that was built was a rock-walled bathhouse and several cabins. The bathhouse entrance was built one story above the spring which was accessed via a staircase. In 1927 the area flooded and several cabins were destroyed, as well as the bridge over the river. Manby died in 1929 without realizing his full plan for developing a resort. He died a gruesome death, having been found decaptiated in his home in Taos. A local folklore legend is that his ghost roams the hot springs area. Other local legends state that he returned to Europe, and that it was not his body that was found, but rather it was "part of a ruse to avoid his creditors."

== Description ==
Manby Hot Springs are a group of several geothermal springs that bubble into several primitive rock-lined soaking pools with sandy bottoms. The ruins of a former bathhouse and cabins still exist on site, as do the ruins of the old stagecoach stop. The main soaking pool is located at the edge of the river. The temperature of this pool is 98 °F, and is several feet deep. A smaller, but warmer soaking pool is located at the foot of the former stagecoach station. Additional soaking pools are located along the river, but sometimes flood out during rainstorms.

== Location ==
The springs are within the Rio Grande del Norte National Monument located on Bureau of Land Management land in the BLM Rio Grande Wild and Scenic River Recreation Area. There is a private riverside trail, Tune Drive, to the springs. The BLM states that the parking area is also located on private land, which is under a 1980s conservation easement. All routes to the springs are partially on private roads. In 2021, the Taos News reported that the president of the Stagecoach Neighborhood Association stated that "The only legal access is floating the river or walking a fisherman's trail along the river."

The springs are located at 36°30’48”N 105°43’32”W on the east bank of the Rio Grande gorge, approximately 12 miles from Taos.

== Water profile ==
The mineral water emerges from the ground at 100 °F (38 °C).

== See also ==
- List of hot springs in the United States
- List of hot springs worldwide
