= The Psychedelic Experience =

Book by Timothy Leary, Ralph Metzner, and Richard Alpert

- Author: Timothy Leary; Ralph Metzner; Richard Alpert
- Language: English
- Publication date: 1964
- Publication place: United States
- Media type: Print (Hardcover & Paperback)

The Psychedelic Experience: A Manual Based on The Tibetan Book of the Dead (commonly referred to as The Psychedelic Experience) is a 1964 book about using psychedelic drugs that was coauthored by Timothy Leary, Ralph Metzner and Richard Alpert. All three authors had taken part in research investigating the therapeutic potential of psychedelic drugs such as LSD, psilocybin and mescaline in addition to the ability of these substances to sometimes induce religious and mystical states of consciousness. The book is described as a classic of 1960s psychedelic literature.

== Composition and publication ==
The text was started as early as 1962 as part of the Zihuatanejo Project in Zihuatanejo, Mexico. It was published in August 1964.

A reading from the book was recorded by the authors on an LP under the name The Psychedelic Experience in 1966. It was reissued on CD by Folkways Records in 2003.

The book contents Timothy Leary's most comprehensive description of set and setting.

== Purpose ==
The book is dedicated to Aldous Huxley, an early proponent of psychedelics, and includes a short introductory citation from The Doors of Perception, Huxley's 1954 nonfiction work on the subject.

The Tibetan Book of the Dead is a Tibetan Buddhist text that was written as a guide for navigating the process of death, the bardo and rebirth into another form. The text of The Psychedelic Experience discusses the Tibetan Book of the Dead and use the process of death and rebirth presented in it as a metaphor for the experience of ego death or depersonalization that is commonly experienced under the influence of psychedelic drugs. The psychedelic internal "journey" is thus likened to a metaphorical death-rebirth experience, with the text intended as a guide.

It therefore discusses the various phases of ego death that can occur on psychedelics and gives specific instructions on how one should regard them and act during each of these different phases. In addition to containing more general advice for the readers on how to use psychedelics, the book also includes selections of writing presented with the intent for them to be read aloud during events during which users take psychedelics collectively.

== Use in other works ==
Part of this text was used by The Beatles in their 1966 song "Tomorrow Never Knows".
