= William Mellon Hitchcock =

American psychedelic drug advocate

- Hitchcock at age 26 in 1966
- Born: July 17, 1939 (age 87)
- Other name: Billy Hitchcock
- Known for: Hitchcock Estate (Millbrook), efforts with psychedelic drugs

William "Billy" Mellon Hitchcock (b. 1939) is a member of the Mellon family who was involved in the psychedelic drug scene of the 1960s and 1970s.

Hitchcock is the son of Tommy Hitchcock Jr., grandson of William Larimer Mellon Sr., and nephew of Andrew Mellon. His father died in a plane crash when he was a young child. He attended the University of Vienna and University of Texas without graduating.

In his twenties he was working as a stockbroker when he met Timothy Leary (through his sister Peggy Mellon Hitchcock) and began using LSD. In 1963, with his twin brother Tommy, he made the Hitchcock Estate in Millbrook, New York available to Leary and his associates, charging a token rent of $500 per month. In 1967, with the scene around Millbrook under increasing pressure from local police, he evicted Leary and moved to the San Francisco Bay Area. Martin A. Lee writes that he financed Tim Scully and Nick Sand's psychedelic-manufacturing activities (both had earlier passed through Millbrook) and later served as money manager for The Brotherhood of Eternal Love.

In 1969 Hitchcock's wife, Aurora, filed for divorce, stating in an affidavit that he had hid profits from drug sales in a Swiss bank. In 1973 he was indicted for tax evasion. He cooperated with the government and testified against Sand and Scully, who were convicted the following year on charges of manufacturing LSD and evading taxes. In 1975 he married the screenwriter and mystery novelist Jane Stanton; they divorced in 1991.

His sister Peggy Mellon Hitchcock died in 2024.

== Sources ==
- Lee, Martin A., and Bruce Shlain. 1992. Acid Dreams: The Complete Social History of LSD: The CIA, the Sixties, and Beyond. 2nd ed. New York, NY: Grove Press.
