= Ram Dass =

American spiritual teacher (1931–2019)

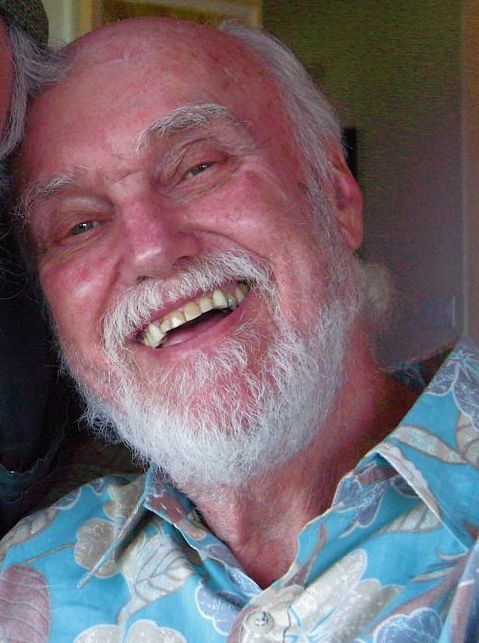
- Ram Dass in 2008
- Born: Richard Alpert; April 6, 1931; Boston, Massachusetts. U.S.
- Died: December 22, 2019 (aged 88); Maui, Hawaii, U.S.
- Education: Tufts University (BA); Wesleyan University (MA); Stanford University (PhD)
- Occupations: Spiritual teacher in the lineage of Neem Karoli Baba, writer

Ram Dass (born Richard Alpert; April 6, 1931 – December 22, 2019), also known as Baba Ram Dass, was an American spiritual teacher, guru of modern yoga, psychologist, and writer. His best-selling 1971 book Be Here Now, which has been described by multiple reviewers as "seminal", helped popularize Eastern spirituality and yoga in the West. He authored or co-authored twelve more books on spirituality over the next four decades, including Grist for the Mill (1977), How Can I Help? (1985), and Polishing the Mirror (2013).

Ram Dass was personally and professionally associated with Timothy Leary at Harvard University in the early 1960s. Then known as Richard Alpert, he conducted research with Leary on the therapeutic effects of psychedelic drugs. In addition, Alpert assisted Harvard Divinity School graduate student Walter Pahnke in his 1962 "Good Friday Experiment" with theology students, the first controlled, double-blind study of drugs and the mystical experience. While not illegal at the time, their research was controversial and led to Alpert's dismissal from Harvard in 1963 (it is commonly thought Leary was dismissed too but in fact his contract had expired).

In 1967, Alpert traveled to India and became a disciple of Hindu guru Neem Karoli Baba, who gave him the name Ram Dass, meaning "Servant of Ram," but usually rendered simply as "Servant of God" for Western audiences. In the following years, he co-founded the charitable organizations Seva Foundation and Hanuman Foundation. From the 1970s to the 1990s, he traveled extensively, giving talks and retreats and holding fundraisers for charitable causes. In 1997, he had a stroke, which left him with paralysis and expressive aphasia characterized as "fluent, anomic-like with hesitations and word finding difficulties at the conversational level with grossly intact auditory comprehension for high level, low-context information". He eventually grew to interpret this event as an act of grace, learning to speak again and continuing to teach and write books. After becoming seriously ill during a trip to India in 2004, he gave up traveling and moved to Maui, Hawaii, where he hosted annual retreats with other spiritual teachers until his death in 2019.

== Early life ==
Ram Dass was born Richard Alpert in 1931. His parents were Gertrude (Levin) and George Alpert, a lawyer in Boston. He considered himself an atheist during his early life. Speaking at Berkeley Community Theater in 1973 he said, "My Jewish trip was primarily political Judaism, I mean I was never Bar Mitzvahed, confirmed, and so on." In a 2006 article in Tufts Magazine he was quoted by Sara Davidson, describing himself as "inured to religion. I didn't have one whiff of God until I took psychedelics." He was also interviewed by Arthur J. Magida at the Omega Institute in Rhinebeck, New York, who published the interview in 2008, quoting Ram Dass as saying "What I mostly remember about my bar mitzvah was that it was an empty ritual. It was flat. Absolutely flat. There was a disappointing hollowness to the moment. There was nothing, nothing, nothing in it for my heart."

=== Education ===
Alpert attended the Williston Northampton School, graduating cum laude in 1948. He earned a Bachelor of Arts degree in psychology from Tufts University in 1952. His father had wanted him to go to medical school, but while at Tufts he decided to study psychology instead. After earning a master's degree in psychology from Wesleyan University in 1954, he was recommended to Stanford University by his mentor at Wesleyan, David McClelland. Alpert wrote his doctoral thesis on "achievement anxiety", receiving his Ph.D. in psychology from Stanford in 1957. Alpert then taught at Stanford for one year, and began psychoanalysis.

=== Harvard professorship ===
McClelland moved to Cambridge, Massachusetts, to teach at Harvard University, and helped Alpert accept a tenure-track position there in 1958 as an assistant clinical psychology professor. Alpert worked with the Social Relations Department, the Psychology Department, the Graduate School of Education, and the Health Service, where he was a therapist. He specialized in human motivation and personality development, and published his first book Identification and Child Rearing.

McClelland did work with his close friend and associate Timothy Leary, a lecturer in clinical psychology at the university, including being co-lecturers on a course on game theory. Alpert and Leary had met through McClelland, who headed the Center for Research in Personality where Alpert and Leary both did research. Alpert was McClelland's deputy in the lab. McClelland asked Alpert to keep an eye on Leary and his "mushroom project" in the winter term of 1961.

In March 1961, Alpert tried synthetic psilocybin, which was his first psychedelic experience. The trip is said to have turned his life around and led to a personal transformation. Alpert experienced ego dissolution during the trip, observing himself first as a Harvard professor but then as other identities and roles throughout his life that he had once assumed but had dissociated from. Eventually, he found himself in a place in which he existed independent of social or physical identity. Alpert found this experience to be deeply freeing and joyous.

==== Harvard projects ====
After returning from a visiting professorship at the University of California, Berkeley, in 1961, Alpert devoted himself to joining Leary in experimentation with and intensive research into the potentially therapeutic effects of hallucinogenic drugs such as psilocybin, LSD-25, and other psychedelic chemicals, through their Harvard Psilocybin Project. Alpert and Leary co-founded the non-profit International Federation for Internal Freedom (IFIF) in 1962 in Cambridge, Massachusetts, in order to carry out studies in the religious use of psychedelic drugs, and were both on the board of directors.

Alpert assisted Harvard Divinity School graduate student Walter Pahnke in his 1962 "Good Friday Experiment" with theology students, the first controlled, double-blind study of drugs and the mystical experience.

==== Dismissal from Harvard ====
Alpert was formally dismissed from Harvard in 1963.

=== Millbrook and psychedelic counterculture (1963–1967) ===
In 1963 Alpert, Leary, and their followers moved to the Hitchcock Estate in Millbrook, New York, after IFIF's New York City branch director and Mellon fortune heiress Peggy Hitchcock arranged for her brother Billy to rent the estate to IFIF. Alpert and Leary immediately set up a communal group with former Harvard Psilocybin Project members at the estate (commonly known as "Millbrook"), and the IFIF was subsequently disbanded and renamed the Castalia Foundation (after the intellectual colony in Hermann Hesse's novel The Glass Bead Game).

The core group at Millbrook, whose journal was the Psychedelic Review, sought to cultivate the divinity within each person. At Millbrook, they experimented with psychedelics and often participated in group LSD sessions, looking for a permanent route to higher consciousness. The Castalia Foundation hosted weekend retreats on the estate where people paid to undergo the psychedelic experience without drugs, through meditation, yoga, and group therapy sessions.

Alpert and Leary co-authored The Psychedelic Experience with Ralph Metzner, based on the Tibetan Book of the Dead, published in 1964. Alpert co-authored LSD with Sidney Cohen and Lawrence Schiller in 1966.

In 1967 Alpert gave talks at the League for Spiritual Discovery's center in Greenwich Village.

== Spiritual search and name change ==
In 1967, Alpert traveled to India where he met American spiritual seeker Bhagavan Das, and later met Neem Karoli Baba.

=== Neem Karoli Baba ===
In 1967, Bhagavan Das guided Alpert throughout India, eventually introducing him to Neem Karoli Baba, whom Alpert called "Maharaj-ji", who became his guru at Kainchi Dham ashram. Alpert was curious about the guru's take on LSD. The day after their first meeting, Neem Karoli Baba asked Alpert to give him the "medicine". Alpert gave him one dose of "white lightning", but he asked for 2 more tabs (915 μg or 9 times the average dose); after trying them, the LSD seemed to have no psychotropic effect on Neem Karoli Baba, but instead told him that the same state could be achieved through meditation and that he could live in that state. After this, Neem Karoli Baba became Richard Alpert's guru, and gave him the name "Ram Dass", which means "servant of God", referring to the incarnation of God as Ram or Lord Rama. Ram Dass called his new guru "Maharaj-ji", and studied with him for the following four years.

=== Be Here Now ===
After Alpert returned to America as Ram Dass, he stayed as a guest at the Lama Foundation in Taos, New Mexico. Ram Dass had helped Steve Durkee (Nooruddeen Durkee) and Barbara Durkee (Asha Greer or Asha von Briesen) co-found the countercultural, spiritual community in 1967, and it had an ashram dedicated to Ram Dass's guru. During Ram Dass's visit, he presented a manuscript he had written, entitled From Bindu to Ojas. The community's residents edited, illustrated, and laid out the text, which ultimately became a best-selling book when published under the name Be Here Now in 1971. The 416-page manual for conscious being was published by the Lama Foundation, as Ram Dass's benefit for the community. Be Here Now contained Ram Dass's account of his spiritual journey, as well as recommended spiritual techniques and quotes. It became a popular guide to New Age spirituality, selling two million copies. The proceeds helped sustain the Lama Foundation for several years, after which they donated the book's copyright and half its proceeds to the Hanuman Foundation in Taos.

Be Here Now is one of the first guides for those not born Hindu to becoming a yogi. For its influence on the hippie movement and subsequent spiritual movements, it has been described as a "countercultural bible" and "seminal" to the era. In addition to introducing its title phrase into common use, Be Here Now has influenced numerous other writers and yoga practitioners, including the Apple Inc. co-founder Steve Jobs, the self-help writer Wayne Dyer, and the poet Lawrence Ferlinghetti.

The first section of the book inspired the lyrics to George Harrison's song "Be Here Now", written in 1971 and released on his 1973 album Living in the Material World.

== Foundations and Living/Dying Project ==
During the 1970s, Ram Dass taught, wrote, and worked with foundations. He founded the Hanuman Foundation, a nonprofit educational and service organization that initiated the Prison-Ashram Project (now known as the Human Kindness Foundation), in 1974. The Hanuman Foundation strives to improve the spiritual well-being of society through education, media and community service programs.

In 1978, Ram Dass co-founded the Seva Foundation with public health leader Larry Brilliant and humanitarian activist Wavy Gravy. The foundation joined with health-care workers to treat the blind in India, Nepal, and developing countries. It has become an international health organization.

In the early 1970s, Ram Dass taught workshops on conscious aging and dying around the United States. Elisabeth Kübler-Ross was one of his students. Ram Dass helped create the Dying Project with its Executive Director Dale Borglum, whom he had met in India. At the time, Borglum was also executive director of the Hanuman Foundation. The Living/Dying Project, based in Marin, California, starting in 1986, was initially named the Dying Center and located in Santa Fe, New Mexico. The Dying Center was the first residential facility in the U.S. where people came to die "consciously".

In 1981, he appeared on an Australian radio documentary about death and near-death experiences that aired on the ABC, And When I Die, Will I Be Dead? It was adapted into a book in 1987.

Ram Dass also served on the faculty of the Metta Institute where he provided training on mindful and compassionate care of the dying.

The Love Serve Remember Foundation was organized to preserve and continue the teachings of Neem Karoli Baba and Ram Dass.

Over the course of his life, since the inception of the Hanuman Foundation, Ram Dass donated his book royalties and profits from teaching to his foundation and other charitable causes. The annual estimate of the earnings he donated ranges from $100,000 to $800,000.

== Later life ==
His guru, Neem Karoli Baba, died on 11 September 1973.

Timothy Leary and Ram Dass, who had grown apart after Ram Dass denounced Leary in a 1974 news conference, reconciled in 1983 at Harvard (at a reunion for the 20th anniversary of their controversial firing from the Harvard faculty), and reunited before Leary's death in May 1996.

Ram Dass explored Judaism seriously for the first time when he was 60 years old. He wrote, "My belief is that I wasn't born into Judaism by accident, and so I needed to find ways to honor that", and "From a Hindu perspective, you are born as what you need to deal with, and if you just try and push it away, whatever it is, it's got you."

In February 1997, Ram Dass had a stroke that left him with expressive aphasia, which he interpreted as an act of grace. He stated, "The stroke was giving me lessons, and I realized that was grace—fierce grace ... Death is the biggest change we'll face, so we need to practice change."

After he almost died from a second stroke during a trip to India in 2004, Ram Dass moved to Maui. In 2013, Ram Dass released a memoir and summary of his teaching, Polishing the Mirror: How to Live from Your Spiritual Heart. In an interview about the book, at age 82, he said that his earlier reflections about facing old age and death now seem naive to him. He said, in part: "Now, I'm in my 80s ... Now, I am aging. I am approaching death. I'm getting closer to the end. ... Now, I really am ready to face the music all around me."

Ram Dass did not leave the Hawaiian Islands until July 2019, when he attended the consecration of a new Hanuman Mandir in Taos, New Mexico, on July 13, 2019, after which he returned to Hawaii and continued to make public appearances and to give talks at small venues; held retreats in Maui; and continued to teach through live webcasts.

Ram Dass died in Maui, on December 22, 2019, at the age of 88.

== Personal life ==
In the 1990s, Ram Dass discussed his bisexuality. He stated, "I've started to talk more about being bisexual, being involved with men as well as women," and added his opinion that for him, his sexuality "isn't gay, and it's not not-gay, and it's not anything—it's just awareness."

At 78, Ram Dass learned that he had fathered a son as a 24-year-old at Stanford, during a brief relationship with history major Karen Saum, and that he was now a grandfather. The fact came to light when his son, Peter Reichard, a 53-year-old banker in North Carolina, took a DNA test after learning about his mother's doubt concerning his parentage.

== Works ==
=== Books ===
- Identification and Child Rearing (with R. Sears and L. Rau) (1962) Stanford University Press
- The Psychedelic Experience: A Manual Based on the Tibetan Book of the Dead (with Timothy Leary and Ralph Metzner) (1964) ISBN 0-8065-1652-6
- LSD (with Sidney Cohen) (1966) ISBN 0-453-00120-3
- Be Here Now or Remember, Be Here Now (1971) ISBN 0-517-54305-2
- Doing Your Own Being (1973) ISBN 978-0854354917
- The Only Dance There Is (1974) ISBN 0-385-08413-7
- Grist for the Mill (with Stephen Levine) (1977) ISBN 0-89087-499-9
- Journey of Awakening: A Meditator's Guidebook (1978) ISBN 0-553-28572-6
- Miracle of Love: Stories about Neem Karoli Baba (1978) ISBN 0-525-47611-3
- How Can I Help? Stories and Reflections on Service (with Paul Gorman) (1985) ISBN 0-394-72947-1
- Compassion in Action: Setting Out on the Path of Service (with Mirabai Bush) (1991) ISBN 0-517-57635-X
- Still Here: Embracing Aging, Changing and Dying (2000) ISBN 1-57322-871-0
- Paths to God: Living The Bhagavad Gita (2004) ISBN 1-4000-5403-6
- Be Love Now (with Rameshwar Das) (2010) ISBN 1-84604-291-7
- Polishing the Mirror: How to Live from Your Spiritual Heart (with Rameshwar Das) (2013) ISBN 1-60407-967-3
- Walking Each Other Home: Conversations on Loving and Dying (with Mirabai Bush) (2018) ISBN 1-68364-200-7
- Being Ram Dass (with Rameshwar Das) (2021) ISBN 9781683646280

=== Recordings ===
- The Psychedelic Experience: A Manual Based on the Tibetan Book of the Dead (with Timothy Leary & Ralph Metzner) (1966) (reissued on CD in 2003 by Folkways)
- Here We All Are, a 3-LP set recorded live in Vancouver, BC in the summer of 1969.
- Love Serve Remember (1973), a six-album set of teachings, data, and spiritual songs (ZBS Foundation) (released in MP3 format, 2008)
- The Evolution of Consciousness (1973), a 3-LP set recorded live in NYC, March 1969 (Noumedia Co - Harbinger Records Ltd.)
- Cosmix (2008), a video enhanced CD of Ram Dass messages mixed with work by Australian DJ and performer Kriece, released on Waveform Records.
- Ram Dass (2019) collaborative album with musician East Forest featuring the final recorded teachings of Ram Dass.
- Colorscapes Volume Two (2021), a Progressive House/Trance compilation album mixed by Praana, Dezza & Matt Fax with audio from Ram Dass.

=== Films ===
- A Change of Heart, a 1994 one-hour documentary directed by Eric Taylor and hosted by Ram Dass and shown on many PBS stations. It examined taking social action as a meditative act.
- Ecstatic States, a 1996 interview on VHS, by Wiseone Edutainment Pty.
- Ram Dass, Fierce Grace, a 2001 biographical documentary directed by Micky Lemle.
- Ram Dass – Love Serve Remember, a 2010 short film directed by V. Owen Bush, included in the Be Here Now Enhanced Edition eBook.
- Dying to Know: Ram Dass & Timothy Leary, a 2014 documentary dual portrait.
- Ram Dass, Going Home, a 2017 documentary portrait of Ram Dass in his later years, directed by Derek Peck.
- Ram Dass, Becoming Nobody, a 2019 documentary portrait of Richard Alpert becoming Ram Dass and Ram Dass becoming nobody. The slogan of the film is: You have to be somebody to become nobody. Directed by Jamie Catto.

== See also ==
- John C. Lilly
