= Be Here Now (book) =

1971 book by Ram Dass

- Author: Ram Dass
- Subject: Spirituality, yoga
- Publisher: Lama Foundation, San Cristobal, New Mexico
- Publication date: 1971
- ISBN: 978-0-517-54305-4
- OCLC: 141386598

Be Here Now, or Remember, Be Here Now, is a 1971 book on spirituality, yoga, and meditation by the American yogi and spiritual teacher Ram Dass (born Richard Alpert). The core book was first printed in 1970 as From Bindu to Ojas and its title since 1971 comes from a statement his guide, Bhagavan Das, made during Ram Dass's journeys in India. The cover features a mandala incorporating the title, a chair, radial lines, and the word "Remember" repeated four times.

Be Here Now has been described by multiple reviewers as "seminal", and helped popularize Eastern spirituality and yoga with the baby boomer generation in the West.

== Summary ==
The book is divided into four sections:

- Journey: The Transformation: Dr. Richard Alpert, Ph.D., into Baba Ram Dass
- From Bindu to Ojas: The Core Book
- Cookbook for a Sacred Life: A Manual for Conscious Being
- Painted Cakes (Do Not Satisfy Hunger): Books

The first section is a short autobiography, describing Alpert's successes as a psychologist, his research with Timothy Leary into psychedelics at Harvard, and his subsequent anxiety when this research did not resolve his spiritual questions. He then describes his first journey to India and his initiation into a Guru-chela relationship with Neem Karoli Baba, and spiritual renaming as "Baba Ram Dass" ("servant of Râm", or "servant of god"). Ram Dass closes the first section of the book with this passage:

Now, though I am a beginner on the path, I have returned to the West for a time to work out karma or unfulfilled commitment. Part of this commitment is to share what I have learned with those of you who are on a similar journey. One can share a message through telling "our-story" as I have just done, or through the teaching methods of yoga, or singing, or making love. Each of us finds his unique vehicle for sharing with others his bit of wisdom. For me, this story is but a vehicle for sharing with you the true message ... the living faith in what is possible. --OM--

The second section, the largest, is a free-form collection of metaphysical, spiritual, and religious reflections accompanied by illustrations. The narrative flow, in the form of a continuous free-verse poem, addresses the reader directly, with Dass's insights gained through different spiritual traditions.

The third section is a manual for starting on a spiritual path, and includes various techniques for yoga, pranayama, and meditation, as well as quotations from respected teachers of many spiritual traditions.

The last section, "Painted Cakes Do Not Satisfy Hunger" (a Zen commentary on liturgy), contains a list of recommended books on religion, spirituality, and consciousness. The book lists are divided into "Books to hang out with", "Books to visit with now & then", and "Books it's useful to have met".

== Publishing history ==
The book has remained in print since its initial publication in 1971, with more than two million copies sold. The work was originally distributed in pamphlet form by the Lama Foundation, then published as a book in 1971. Its original title was From Bindu to Ojas, with illustrations by Lama community residents. In 1971, when Be Here Now was first published by the Lama Foundation in New Mexico, some preliminary copies were sent to India. That original edition underwent several revisions as noted later by Ram Dass in Be Love Now (2010): "When it was read to Maharaj-ji, he told me to change some of the parts about Baba Hari Dass, who had been my sadhana tutor..." Those changes, introduced after "Hari Dass was no longer involved in the intense physical work and management of the Nainital temples", were presented without a critical revision.

In 1977, the Lama Foundation gave the copyright and half the proceeds from the book to the Hanuman Foundation in support of its spiritual and humanitarian projects.

The book is currently published by Three Rivers Press, an imprint of Random House.

== Sequels ==
Ram Dass wrote two sequels to Be Here Now. The first was Still Here: Embracing Aging, Changing, and Dying (2000), and the second was Be Love Now: The Path of the Heart (2010).

== Cultural impact ==
Be Here Now is one of the first guides for those not born Hindu to becoming a yogi. For its influence on the hippie movement and subsequent spiritual movements, it has been described as a "countercultural bible" and "seminal" to the era. In addition to introducing its title phrase into common use, Be Here Now has influenced numerous other writers and yoga practitioners, including the industrialist Steve Jobs, the self-help author Wayne Dyer, and the poet Lawrence Ferlinghetti.

The first section of the book inspired the lyrics to George Harrison's song "Be Here Now", written in 1971 and released on his 1973 album Living in the Material World.
