= Ralph Metzner =

German-American psychologist, psychotherapist, and researcher (1936–2019)

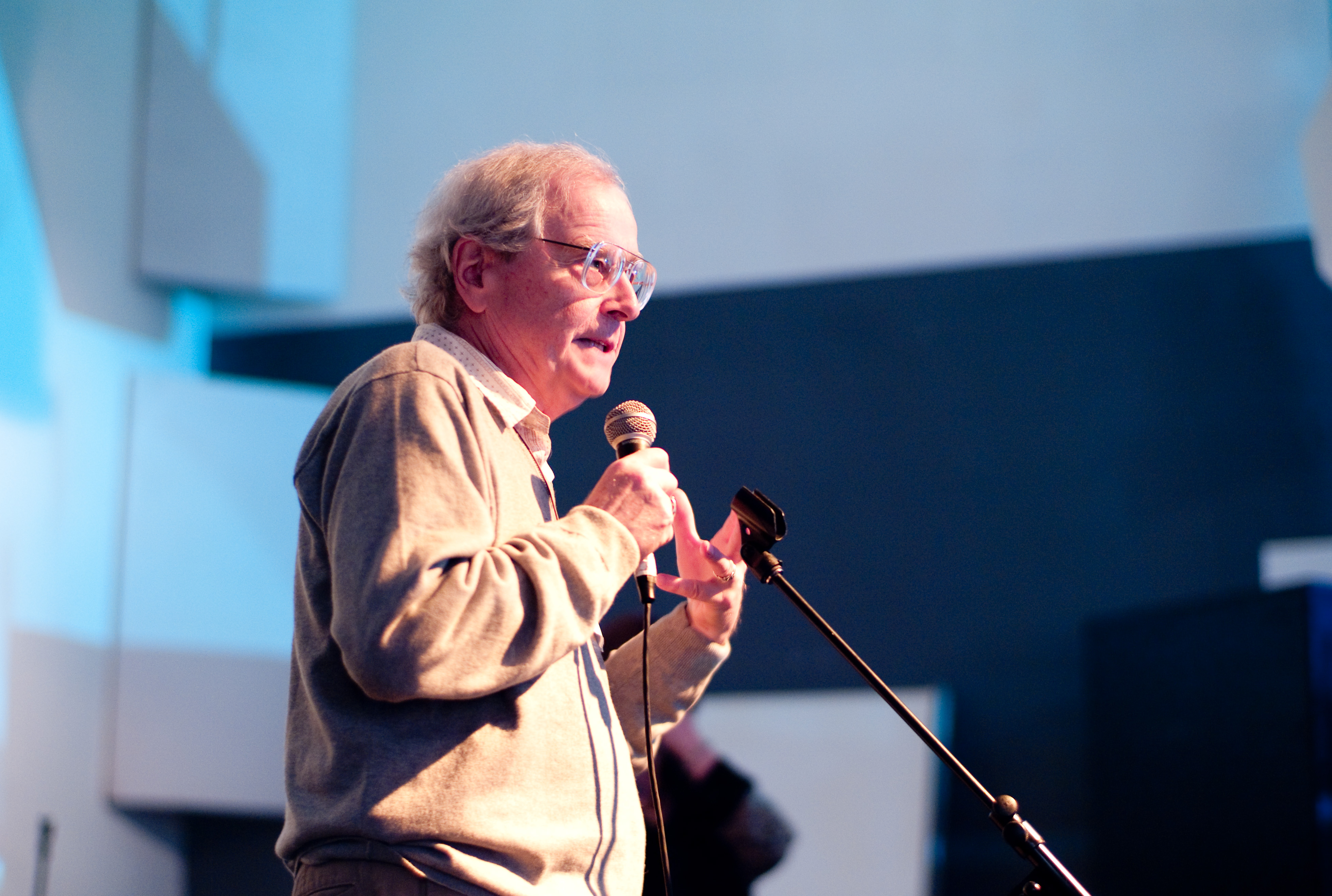
- Born: May 18, 1936; Berlin, Germany
- Died: March 14, 2019; Sonoma, California, U.S.
- Education: Harvard University
- Known for: Work with psychedelics and altered states of consciousness

Ralph Metzner (May 18, 1936 – March 14, 2019) was a German-born American psychologist, writer and researcher, who participated in psychedelic research at Harvard University in the early 1960s with Timothy Leary and Richard Alpert (later named Ram Dass). Metzner was a psychotherapist, and Professor Emeritus of psychology at the California Institute of Integral Studies in San Francisco, where he was formerly the Academic Dean and Academic Vice-president.

== Life and work ==
Metzner was involved in consciousness research, including psychedelics, yoga, meditation and shamanism for over 50 years. He was a co-founder and President of the Green Earth Foundation, a non-profit educational organization devoted to healing and harmonizing the relationship between humans and the Earth. Metzner was featured in the 2006 film Entheogen: Awakening the Divine Within, a documentary about rediscovering an enchanted cosmos in the modern world.

Ralph Metzner at the Sacred Elixirs Conference in San Jose, 2005.

He conducted workshops on consciousness transformation and alchemical divination, both nationally and internationally. He was also a poet and singer-songwriter and produced two CDs with Kit Walker: A spoken word CD (Spirit Soundings, with music by Kit Walker) and one music CD of original songs (Bardo Blues). His books include The Well of Remembrance, The Unfolding Self, Green Psychology, and two edited collections on the science and the phenomenology of Ayahuasca and Teonanácatl, and a collection of reports about MDMA experiences. Metzner provided the foreword for Through the Gateway of the Heart: Accounts of Experiences with MDMA and Other Empathogenic Substances (1986).

He received his Ph.D. in Psychology from Harvard.

Metzner coined the term "empathogen" to describe the unique effects of drugs like MDA and MDMA in 1983.

== Bibliography ==
- Metzner, Ralph (2020). Alchemical Musings (Hardcover ed.). Berkeley, CA: Regent Press. ISBN 978-1587904769.
- Metzner, Ralph (2019). Searching for the Philosophers' Stone (paperback ed.). Rochester, VT: Park Street Press. ISBN 978-1620557761.
- Metzner, Ralph (2017). Overtones and Undercurrents: Spirituality, Reincarnation, and Ancestor Influence in Entheogenic Psychotherapy (paperback ed.). Rochester, VT: Park Street Press. ISBN 978-1620556894.
- Metzner, Ralph (2017). Ecology of Consciousness: The Alchemy of Personal, Collective, and Planetary Transformation (paperback ed.). Oakland, CA: New Harbinger Publications. ISBN 978-1626256194.
- Metzner, Ralph (2015). Allies for Awakening: Guidelines for productive and safe experiences with entheogens (paperback ed.). Berkeley, CA: Green Earth Foundation & Regent Press. ISBN 978-1587903083.
- Metzner, Ralph (2013). The Toad and the Jaguar: A Field Report of Underground Research on a Visionary Medicine: Bufo Alvarius And 5-Methoxy-dimethyltryptamine (paperback ed.). Berkeley, CA: Green Earth Foundation & Regent Press. ISBN 978-1587902543.
- Metzner, Ralph (2010). Birth of a Psychedelic Culture: Conversations about Leary, the Harvard Experiments, Millbrook and the Sixties (paperback ed.). Santa Fe, NM: Synergetic Press. ISBN 978-0-907791-38-6.
- Metzner, Ralph (2009). Mind Space Time Stream (paperback ed.). Berkeley, CA: Green Earth Foundation & Regent Press. ISBN 978-1-58790-172-0.
- Metzner, Ralph (2009). Alchemical Divination (paperback ed.). Berkeley, CA: Green Earth Foundation & Regent Press. ISBN 978-1-58790-162-1.
- Metzner, Ralph (2008). The Roots of War and Domination (paperback ed.). Berkeley, CA: Green Earth Foundation & Regent Press. ISBN 978-1-58790-150-8.
- Metzner, Ralph (2008). The Expansion of Consciousness (paperback ed.). Berkeley, CA: Green Earth Foundation & Regent Press. ISBN 978-1-58790-147-8.
- Sacred Vine of Spirits: Ayahuasca (paperback ed.). Rochester, VT: Park Street Press. 2006. ISBN 1-59477-053-0.
- Sacred Mushroom of Visions: Teonanacatl (paperback ed.). Rochester, VT: Park Street Press. 2005. ISBN 1-59477-044-1.
- Green Psychology – Transforming our Relationship to the Earth (paperback ed.). Rochester, VT: Park Street Press. 1999. ISBN 0-89281-798-4.
- The Unfolding Self: Varieties of Transformative Experience (rev. ed. of Opening to Inner Light ed.). Novato, CA: Origin Press. 1998. ISBN 1-57983-000-5.
- The Well of Remembrance: Rediscovering the Earth Wisdom Myths of Northern Europe. Boston: Shambhala. 1994. ISBN 1-57062-028-8.
- Opening to Inner Light: The Transformation of Human Nature and Consciousness. Los Angeles: J.P. Tarcher. 1986. ISBN 0-87477-354-7.
- (1979). Know Your Type: Maps of Identity (Anchor Press; 1st edition) ISBN 0-385-13162-3
- Maps of Consciousness: I Ching, Tantra, Tarot, Alchemy, Astrology, Actualism (paperback ed.). New York: Collier Books. 1971. ISBN 0-02-077400-1.
- The Ecstatic Adventure. New York: Macmillan. 1968. ISBN 0025844504.
- Leary, Timothy; Ralph Metzner, and Richard Alpert (1992) [1963]. The Psychedelic Experience: A Manual Based on the Tibetan Book of the Dead (paperback ed.). New York: Citadel Press. ISBN 0-8065-1652-6.

== Discography ==
- 1966 – The Psychedelic Experience: A Manual Based on the Tibetan Book of the Dead (with Richard Alpert & Timothy Leary) (reissued on CD in 2003 by Folkways)
- 2006 – Bardo Blues – and Other Songs of Liberation (with Kit Walker) Music CD (Green Earth Foundation)
- 2009 – Cognition Factor (2009)
