= Phasenvoid =

Studio album by Vibravoid
- Released: 2003
- Recorded: 1992–1997
- Genres: Neo-psychedelia, Neo-Kraut Rock
- Length: 23:41
- Labels: Nasoni Records, Stoned Karma Records
- Producer: Christian Koch

Vibravoid chronology
Void Vibration (2002)	Phasenvoid (2003)	Turned on Acid (2003)

Phasenvoid is an album by the Düsseldorf-based, neo-psychedelic rock and Neo-Kraut Rock band Vibravoid. The album documents the band's formative phase. Music critics retrospectively described Vibravoid as a pioneer of the vinyl revival and the inventor of Neo-Kraut Rock.

== Recording and production ==
The material was recorded from 1992 to 1997, and produced using analogue cassette tape machines and self-made multi-track recorders. The equipment included Nordmende Clipper, Fostex X-15 and Tascam Portastudio 424 recorders. Analogue instruments and effects were used to record the tracks.

Instrumentation included conventional electric guitars, including Fender Telecaster and Gibson SG, and vintage electronic organs such as the Vox Super Continental II, Vox Jaguar and Bontempi Top Electronic SF 150. The analogue BOSS DM-1 delay machine was used to produce echo and modulation effects. Also used were a sitar, Tibetan Ghanta (bell), field recordings of a water bucket, wind chimes and sounds produced by a repurposed television set. All of the instruments were played by Christian Koch.

The album's art concept refers to the equipment with which the album was recorded. The cover depicts the analogue phaser, a Lemonstudio Babyphase, that was used on the recordings.

== Release ==
Phasenvoid was first released in 2003 by the Berlin independent label Nasoni Records as a split LP with Sula Bassana. The pressing consisted of 400 copies on black vinyl, and 100 copies on red-and-white marbled vinyl. In 2013, Stoned Karma Records re-released a two-CD album of The Politics of Ecstasy, which included the original Phasenvoid tracks as a bonus.

In 2022, Stoned Karma Records re-issued an expanded and remastered version under the title Phasenvoid 1992–1997 (Vibrations From A Lost Decade) as a two-CD and two-LP set. It included eleven previously unreleased recordings from the same period and an audio interview from Radio Netzkraut in 1997. The two-LP edition has a lenticular cover with an animated op art effect.

== Reception ==
Music publications have reviewed Phasenvoid as a document of the band's early work. Ox-Fanzine described the reissue as a comprehensive overview of Vibravoid's early period. Reviewer Gereon Helmer wrote: "At times, it sounds like Spacemen 3, but also like early Harmonia, Kluster or the first two Kraftwerk albums." In a contemporaneous review of the original 2003 release, Bernd Sievers, writing for Eclipsed, described the album as a "small psychedelic gem". Sievers called Vibravoid's seven tracks "wonderfully otherworldly, instrumental, abstract soundscapes". He noted they are never shrill but subtle, with some tracks underpinned by simple sequencer patterns. He compared the music to a mixture of Tangerine Dream's album Sorcerer and Pink Floyd's A Saucerful of Secrets.

The Italian music magazine Blow Up described the album as a multi-layered mosaic of recordings created with an array of analogue keyboards, guitar effects and electronic drums. Reviewer Roberto Calabrò placed the band's early work in the context of 1990s neo-psychedelia; He compared the album to works by British bands such as Spacemen 3 and Sun Dial. The review also noted the influence of Pink Floyd's early work and the period immediately following Syd Barrett's departure on the album. TimeMazine from Greece also noted the historical value of the recordings and described the track "Jukebox" as "Electro-Kraut" with a raw sound. The reviewer said it evokes a meeting of Kraftwerk and Neu! within a soundscape reminiscent of the industrialised sound of Cologne band Can. The review also noted the recording techniques used at the time, when analogue equipment was not regarded as collectible vintage equipment, but as second-hand goods or scrap.

Claus Wittwer, writing for Ox-Fanzine, reviewed the first reissue of Phasenvoid (included on The Politics Of Ecstasy 2CD) as a distinct musical facet of Vibravoid and said the mainly electronic soundscape reveals "a completely different side of Vibravoid". Wittwer characterized the music as meditative, ambient, chill-out with psychedelic elements. In It's Psychedelic Baby magazine, Andrija Babovic wrote that Vibravoid clears listeners' minds with the modern-sounding, retro-psychedelic tracks "Void Vibrato", "Minddecision", "Bellflight" and "Microvoid". He described "Journey To the Center Of The Sun" as "unique and phenomenal".

In a 2013 review of the reissue The Politics of Ecstasy, the Austrian magazine Slam wrote of Phasenvoid: "One might think that this is an overdose of psychedelic rock music, but the music on offer casts its spell from the very first second and makes saturation with its hypnotic sounds almost impossible". Alfred Crespo, in the Spanish magazine Ruta 66, compared Phasenvoid with Hawkwind, Amon Düül and the psychedelic Krautrock scene, and described the music as timeless.

In German Visions magazine, Jan Schwarzkamp reviewed the two-CD edition as "a great collection of material that gives newcomers an insight into the band's work to date". Claudio Sorge, writing for Rumore, described the two-CD reissue, which includes Phasenvoid, as a hypnotic space-rock journey and "Transpsichedelia". In 2013, Rebekka Mruck wrote in the German magazine Melodie & Rhythmus: "Vibravoid is rightly regarded as playing a leading role in the European psychedelic underground scene".

== Track listing ==
The Phasenvoid side of the original 2003 release contains the following tracks:

1. "Void Vibrato"
2. "Minddecision"
3. "Bellflight"
4. "Microvoid"
5. "Excerpt From A Journey To The Sun"
6. "Meditation Endstation"
7. "Phasenvoid"
