= Daryl Haney =

American screenwriter

- Born: June 21, 1963 (age 62); Charlottesville, Virginia, United States
- Other name: D.R. Haney
- Occupations: Actor, Screenwriter, Novelist, and Essayist
- Years active: 1983-present

Daryl Haney (born June 21, 1963 in Charlottesville, Virginia), also known by the pen names Duke Haney and D. R. Haney, is an American actor, screenwriter, novelist, and essayist.

== Film career ==
Born to a Virginia farming family, Haney relocated to New York City at age eighteen and studied acting with Mira Rostova and Frank Corsaro. He made his film debut in a NYU student short directed by Joseph Minion, who would later write the Golden Globe-nominated Martin Scorsese film After Hours (1985).

Soon after moving to New York, Haney was cast in his first starring role in a feature film, the Canadian thriller Self Defense (1983). A few years later, Haney was hired by Joseph Minion to write and star in the Roger Corman production Daddy's Boys, a period crime drama directed by Minion and made in order to utilize leftover sets from Big Bad Mama 2 (1987). For Haney, this began a six-year association with Corman's Concorde Pictures.

Immediately after completing Daddy's Boys, Haney was asked to write Friday the 13th Part VII: The New Blood for Paramount Pictures. As Haney recalls in Peter M. Bracke's book Crystal Lake Memories: The Complete History of Friday the 13th (2005): "Barbara [Sachs, Associate Producer] was the first person I had contact with. I pitched her a few ideas and she shot them all down. I only had one more. I said, 'I notice that at the end of these movies, there's always a teenage girl who's left to battle Jason by herself. What if this girl had telekinetic powers?' Barbara immediately said, 'Jason vs. Carrie. Huh. That's an interesting idea.' Then we talked once or twice before I had to go back to New York. The next day I had literally just flown in and walked up the stairs of my old apartment, and the phone rang. It was Barbara saying: 'You got the job.'"

Haney relocated to Los Angeles, working often for Roger Corman, who continued his tradition of Edgar Allan Poe adaptations by asking Haney to write a new film version of Masque of the Red Death in 1989, in which Haney appeared as an actor. He also had acting roles in Corman's Lords of the Deep (1989) and The Unborn (1991), and wrote the film Dance with Death (1992) for Corman, which was based on a story by Poison Ivy creators Andy Ruben and his then-wife Katt Shea, and included an early performance by Lisa Kudrow. Around the same time, Haney landed a role in Sketch Artist (1992), which starred Drew Barrymore, Sean Young, and Jeff Fahey. In 1994, he wrote the story for the film Stranger by Night.

After Haney left Concorde, he was approached by British director-producer Harry Bromley Davenport to write the third installment of his Xtro franchise, Xtro 3: Watch the Skies (1995). This began a working relationship that resulted in Life Among the Cannibals (1996), a black comedy that garnered a cult following upon its release. Cannibals stars Kieran Mulroney, Juliet Landau, Mason Adams, Bette Ford, Wings Hauser, and Haney as Troy, a hypersensitive serial killer. The film was well received on the festival circuit, getting a Special Mention at the 1998 Málaga International Week of Fantastic Cinema, and nominated for Best Film at Fantasporto 1999 and a Grand Jury Prize at the Florida Film Festival 1997.

Haney and Bromley-Davenport followed Life Among the Cannibals with Erasable You (1998), another black comedy, this one starring Timothy Busfield, Melora Hardin from NBC's The Office (2005), and veteran actor M. Emmet Walsh. Next was Mockingbird Don't Sing (2001), based on the true story of Genie, a feral child who was confined to her bedroom by her mentally unstable father until California authorities discovered her, mute and uncivilized, at the age of thirteen.

In 2000, Haney temporarily relocated to Belgrade, Serbia, where he had a starring role in the Serbian film Rat uživo and became a recognizable actor in Belgrade. Back in the U.S., Haney appeared as a drug dealer in Jennifer Lynch's Surveillance (2008), which stars Bill Pullman and Julia Ormond. Haney also played a small part in Bromley-Davenport's Frozen Kiss (2008).

== Literary career ==
While living in Belgrade, Haney began work on a novel, Banned for Life, which would take him nine years to complete, and for which he adopted the pen name D. R. Haney. Haney has explained the pen name by saying that he was embarrassed by some of the films on his resume: "I didn’t feel I could put my name on [Banned for Life]. I’d destroyed my name, or so I thought. At the same time, it would’ve killed me to use a pseudonym. How could I use a false name on a work so close to my heart?"

Banned for Life is about the search for a mysteriously vanished punk-rock icon, and the book, published by Vancouver's And/Or Press in May 2009, was praised by underground-music journals such as Maximum RocknRoll, Razorcake, and Big Wheel. The Big Wheel review referred to the book as a "thinly disguised memoir," about which Haney later said, "It’s not. I tried to make it read like one, but despite some biographical overlap, the narrator and I have led very different lives."

Following the publication of Banned for Life, Haney began to contribute essays to Brad Listi's literary website The Nervous Breakdown, quickly becoming one of the site's most popular writers. In October 2010, Subversia, a collection of Haney's essays for The Nervous Breakdown, was published as the inaugural title of the site's imprint, TNB Books.

Death Valley Superstars: Occasionally Fatal Adventures in Filmland, Haney's second collection of essays, was published in December 2018.

== Bibliography ==
- Banned for Life (2009) (ISBN 1-42-762499-2)
- Subversia (2010) (ISBN 978-0-9828598-0-3)
- Death Valley Superstars (2018) (ISBN 978-0-692172391)

== Awards ==
Rhode Island International Film Festival
Year	Nominated work	Category	Result
2001	Mockingbird Don't Sing	Best Screenplay	Won
