= Subversia =

- Author: D. R. Haney
- Language: English
- Subject: childhood, relationships, music, film, celebrity
- Genre: nonfiction, essays, memoir
- Publisher: TNB Books
- Publication date: 9 October 2010
- Publication place: United States of America
- Media type: Print, ebook
- Pages: 240
- ISBN: 978-0-9828598-0-3

Subversia is a collection of autobiographical nonfiction by American novelist D. R. Haney, published in 2010 by TNB Books.

The collection, comprising thirty short essays, none longer than 2500 words, is divided into five sections. "Memoria” is primarily concerned with childhood and adolescence; “Amitcia" ponders friendship and love; “Musica” draws on Haney's participation in the underground music scene; "Fama" looks at the noted and notorious as observed by Haney, a professional actor and screenwriter before he became an author; and “Liber" mostly consists of interviews with Haney about his work as a writer.

Subversia was the inaugural title of TNB Books, the book imprint of The Nervous Breakdown (TNB), an online culture magazine. Haney has been a contributor to TNB since 2009, and the majority of the essays in Subversia were originally published on the website. When interviewed by the National Book Critics Circle, The Nervous Breakdown's Founding Editor, Brad Listi, said of the decision to make Haney his premiere author: “He's a great talent who has lived quite a life, and his fan base on TNB is extremely devoted. The site has given us some pretty unique insight into how much passion his work can generate among readers...”

== Reaction ==
Reviews for Subversia were strong. New York Journal of Books called it “an accounting of real life in perfect focus,” while L.A. Observed pointed to Haney as a “near-master of the final sentence, the one that pulls it all together and adds a dimension to the whole piece..." The San Antonio Current said, “One good tale surfaces in the wake of another, and it’s the juxtaposition of them that resonates,” and for PANK magazine the book was “a joyful read on depressing subjects, and the consistency and precision of the writing makes it work,” adding that Haney “writes in a way that is infectious and gimmick-free…his enthusiasm for people, creativity and the whole world, is bottomless.”
