= The Politics of Ecstasy =

The Politics of Ecstasy may refer to:

- The Politics of Ecstasy (book), a 1968 book by Timothy Leary
- The Politics of Ecstasy (Nevermore album), 1996
- The Politics of Ecstasy (Vibravoid album), 2008
