= Bruce Eisner =

American writer, psychologist, psychedelicist, and activist (born 1948)

- Born: Bruce Jay Ehrlich; February 26, 1948; Brooklyn, New York, US
- Died: January 1, 2013 (aged 64); Las Vegas, Nevada, US
- Occupations: Writer, psychologist, spokesperson
- Writing career
- Language: English
- Period: 1970–2013
- Genre: Psychology

Bruce Jay Ehrlich (February 26, 1948 – January 1, 2013), better known by his pen name Bruce Eisner, was an American writer, psychologist, and counterculture spokesman mostly known for his book Ecstasy: The MDMA Story.

== Biography ==
Eisner was born in Brooklyn, New York. At age 2, he moved with his family to the San Fernando Valley near Los Angeles. His first publication was at age of sixteen, when he won an LA County-wide essay contest. The essay, "Democracy and What It Means to Me" was published in the Congressional Record by Congressman Ed Reinecke.

Eisner attended San Fernando Valley State College (now known as California State University, Northridge) where he was on the Deans List for his first two years of attendance. During his third year, he became an anti-Vietnam War activist and joined the Students for a Democratic Society. At the end of his third year, in 1969, he dropped out of college and moved to Laguna Beach which was then home base for Timothy Leary and the Brotherhood of Eternal Love. In the fall of 1969, Eisner first went to Europe where he lived in the Netherlands and then traveled overland to India.

In January 1970, Eisner returned to Los Angeles where he became a freelance journalist writing feature articles on topics focusing on LSD and the psychedelic consciousness movement for the underground press. He wrote articles for the Los Angeles Free Press edited by Art Kunkin, the L.A. Star, and a variety of other small publications. In 1976, he became a contributing editor for High Times magazine and wrote a series of articles including "LSD Purity" and "Who Turned on Whom" with Peter Stafford. Also in 1976, Eisner traveled to Europe where he met author Michael Hollingshead in England and LSD-discoverer Albert Hofmann in Basel, Switzerland.

In 1977, Eisner moved from Los Angeles to Santa Cruz, California. There he became one of the leaders of a group of psychedelic movement activists. That group known as Linkage brought Albert Hofmann to UC Santa Cruz in 1977 for his first public lecture in the US at a conference called "LSD: A Generation Later." The conference was attended by both counterculture figures such as Timothy Leary, Allen Ginsberg, Ram Dass, Stephen Gaskin, and Ralph Metzner, as well as early psychedelic researchers including Oscar Janiger, William McGlothlin, Stanley Krippner, Claudio Naranjo and Willis Harman.

Eisner received his BA in psychology from the University of California, Santa Cruz in 1979. He moved to Goleta, California for two years and received his MA in psychology from the University of California, Santa Barbara. Eisner worked as a Teaching Assistant at U.C. Santa Barbara. In 1980, he became a contributing writer for Omni magazine.

Eisner returned to Santa Cruz in 1981, and in 1982, moved into a home near Natural Bridges State Beach. He began working on his PhD in psychology from Saybrook Graduate School and Research Center in 1982, but withdrew before completing a dissertation in 1988. In 1989, Eisner started a self-improvement software company called Mindware, which published a catalog of mind tool and personal development software programs called the Mindware Catalog until 1995.

In 1990, Eisner started the Island Group, which produced salons that encouraged discussions surrounding the creation of a "psychedelic culture". The group was named after the 1962 Island by Aldous Huxley. The Island Group conceived and co-organized the 1992 "The Bridge: Linking the Past, Present and Future of Psychedelics" a two-day conference held at Stanford University. Island also conceived and co-organized "Bicycle Day: Celebrating 50 Years of LSD" at the University of California Santa Cruz, in April 1993.

Eisner created the Mind Media Life Enhancement Network in 1996, one of the first websites that provided a portal to other self-improvement and personal development websites.

In 1998, Eisner transformed the Island Group into the Island Foundation—a 501 (c)(3) non-profit organization; however, the Foundation's exempt status was automatically revoked by the IRS after Eisner failed to file taxes for three consecutive years.

In 2003, Eisner moved to Las Vegas, Nevada to be close to his mother, Irene, who died in 2009 at age 82.

== Death ==
Bruce died on New Year's Day 2013 at his home in Las Vegas from a gastrointestinal hemorrhage. He was working on his online book, Future Culture: How to Make New Memes to Change the World, when he died.

== Bibliography ==
=== Books ===
- Ecstasy: The MDMA Story 1989. 1994 revised ed, Ronin Publishing ISBN 0-914171-68-2

=== Articles ===
- LSD Purity. By Bruce Eisner, publication: High Times, 1977.
- Why We Get High. By Bruce Eisner, Original publication: Island Views Newsletter, 1995–1996.
- A Call for a Psychedelic Sanctuary. By Bruce Eisner, Original publication: Island Views Newsletter, 2001.
- MDMA, Personality and Human Nature: The Power to Transform People. By Bruce Eisner.
- LSD and Aldous Huxley’s Island: Setting Sail for a Better Country. By Bruce Eisner published in Gaia News No. 14.

=== Fiction ===
- Lovelights@LearyEisner.com. By Bruce Eisner and Timothy Leary, 1996, published on New World Disorder, 2004.

=== Interviews conducted ===
- Interview with an Alchemist: Bear Owlsey.By Bruce Eisner; Original Publication: Psychedelic Island Views, 1997.
- Modern Alchemy: Modern Alchemy: Interview with Ann and Sasha Shulgin. By Bruce Eisner with Peter Stafford, original publication: Psychedelic Island Views, 1997.
- Psychedelic Culture An Interview with Terence Mckenna. By Bruce Eisner original publication: Psychedelic Island Views, 1998.
- Timothy Leary's Ultimate Trip. By Bruce Eisner original publication: Psychedelic Island Views, 1996.

=== Interviews given ===
- Interview with Bruce Eisner. Original Publication: Cruzio.Com's Hawk Magazine; May 1996.

=== Lecture videos ===
- LSD and Aldous Huxley’s Island: Setting Sail for a Better Country. International Symposium on LSD, Basel, Switzerland. January 2006
- The History and Future of LSD. International Conference on Altered States, Santa Fe, New Mexico, October 2001
