= Void Vibration =

Studio album by Vibravoid
- Released: September 2002
- Recorded: 2001–2002
- Genres: Neo-psychedelic rock, Neo-Kraut Rock
- Length: 42:05
- Labels: Nasoni Records, Krauted Mind Records
- Producer: Vibravoid

Vibravoid chronology
2001 (2000)	Void Vibration (2002)	Phasenvoid (2003)

Void Vibration is the second studio album by Düsseldorf neo-psychedelic and Neo-Kraut rock band Vibravoid. The album was released in September 2002 by Berlin independent record label Nasoni Records. The album was named "CD of the Month" by major German music magazine Eclipsed.

Recording sessions at Potter's Work Studio in Essen (February 1994), with an analogue ACE inline console and side-rack equipment.

== Recording and production ==
The album was initially recorded on analogue tape at the Düsseldorf studio "Das Kleine Analoge" in November and December 2001 with a Fostex G24S 24-track tape recorder (1-inch). However, most of these recordings did not make it onto the album but were released later on Triptamine E.P. Volume 1. The version of the title track Void Vibration from these sessions remains unreleased and is considered lost.

The band re-recorded all tracks except Echovoid and Electrovoid in 2002 at the Institut für Wohlklangforschung in Hanover, assisted by Willi Dammeier on a Telefunken M15A 2-inch 24-track tape recorder and an Amek Angela mixing console. The album was mastered by Michael Schwabe at the Monoposto Studios. The album was produced in Dolby Surround quadraphonic sound. For the track Echovoid, two separate tape echo units were used, a Roland Space Echo and a Dynacord echo unit.

== Style and sound ==
Void Vibration is intended as an analogue counterpoint to the digital revolution in music production emerging in the 1990s. Stylistically, the album combines the experimental electronic influences of the Düsseldorf School with elements of classic flower power psychedelia and Kraut Rock. The overall sound is characterised by the use of analogue vintage effects, tape echo units, synthesizer and sitar sounds. Alongside psychedelic passages are noise-heavy walls of guitar sound that display influences from the early sound of Pink Floyd.

== Historical context of the songs ==
Void Vibration is retrospectively regarded as a document of the German underground of the 1990s and the emerging vinyl revival. Other official releases of alternative versions date the songs during that decade. The track Adjustment was composed as early as 1992 and first recorded on 10 February 1994 at Potter's Work Studio in Essen, using a Fostex B16 reel-to-reel recorder and an ACE Audio Engineering mixing console. The original 1994 recording was first released on the demo tape One Nation Underground in the same year before appearing on the album Turned On Acid in 2003. A new recording of the song was released as a 7-inch single on Nasoni Records in 2001. This version had been recorded at the Düsseldorf studio "Das Kleine Analoge" using a Tascam 8-track tape recorder and was reviewed by contemporary press coverage. The single was released on grey marbled vinyl. Since this particular recording had already been released as a single, the band re-recorded the song in Hanover for the LP version of Void Vibration but included both songs from the 7” single as bonus tracks on the 2002 edition of the CD.

The title track Void Vibration dates back to 1995 and is documented by historical demo tapes, live recordings from the period in which it was created and contemporary radio broadcasts. While the track Vivid Vision dates to 1996, the record credits identify Black And White and Creepy People as new compositions from 2001.

== Release and special editions ==
The CD edition was released in September 2002 on Nasoni Records and distributed by Swamp Room Distribution. The official record release party followed in December 2002 with a Vibravoid concert at the Duncker Club in Berlin. A recording of this show was released as Live At Duncker Berlin 2002 in 2025. The vinyl edition was released in 2003. The CD edition came in a black cover, while the LP was released in a white gatefold sleeve with blind embossing and a custom die-cut to be used for an optical effect. The LP was released in four different editions, including a DMM pressing in Dolby Surround quadraphonic sound on black 180-gram virgin vinyl, a white vinyl version, a regular black vinyl version and a black-and-white picture disc featuring an Op Art motif. This record is visually matched to the transparent inner sleeve printed with another Op Art graphic and being placed underneath the die cut opening. If the record is rotated inside the sleeve, moving Op Art effects are created. Production problems caused by an error during the die-cutting process delayed the regular delivery of the gatefold sleeves until February 2003.

== Reissues ==
In 2007, a remastered CD version was released by Nasoni Records. In 2012, a limited "10th Anniversary Deluxe Edition" was released by Krauted Mind Records as a double LP featuring a kinetic Op Art lenticular sleeve and as a double kinetic Op Art picture disc set in a PVC sleeve. Another limited vinyl edition was released in 2016 for the band's 25th anniversary on red-and-black marbled vinyl and included a construction kit for a cardboard pyramid named by the band the "Psychedelic Power Pyramid".

== Reception ==
The music magazine Visions described the album as an "atmospherically dense album somewhere between psychedelia, art rock and new wave", whose wide song structures are flooded with synthesizer and sitar streams. It also noted parallels to Pink Floyd, New Order and the noisy moments of Monster Magnet.

Ox-Fanzine praised the album as a successful development that surpassed the innovative psychedelic sound of its predecessor.

The magazine Guitar Galore described the album as "a journey through the world of psychedelic sound" and as "truly pure sound".

Music critic Mark Pause noted in Coolibri that the album was a more minimalistic approach and more firmly rooted in psychedelic rock. He also wrote that the record "makes even genre heavyweights such as Monster Magnet look like harmless schoolchildren" and that "Vibravoid is the most innovative Düsseldorf band since Kraftwerk".

== Track listing ==
1. Black And White – 4:39
2. Creepy People – 4:32
3. Adjustment – 3:20
4. Echovoid – 5:28
5. Vivid Vision – 3:34
6. Electrovoid – 0:58
7. Void Vibration – 12:50
8. Silent Screams – 3:22
