= Timothy Leary bibliography =

The following is a list of works by Timothy Leary. The majority of Leary's works were put into the public domain by his estate in 2009.

== Articles ==
- "Turn On / Tune In / Drop Out." East Village Other, vol. 1, no. 12 (June 1966), p. 5.

Dr. Leary introduces and explains his famous psychedelic mantra "turn on, tune in, drop out". Supposedly the first installment of a regular column, but apparently this was the only one.

=== Academic journals ===
- Freedman, MB; Leary, TF; Ossorio, AG; Coffey, HS (1951). "The interpersonal dimension of personality" (PDF). J Pers. 20: 143–61. doi:10.1111/j.1467-6494.1951.tb01518.x. PMID 14918048.
  - Reprinted as a 28-page off-print by Duke University Press. OCLC 881405739.

"The studies on which this paper is based have been sponsored by Permanente Foundation Hospital, Oakland, California, under the codirection of Hubert S. Coffey, Ph.D, and Harvey Powelson, M.D. The current expanded research project is in part supported by the U.S. Public Health Service under the direction of Saxton T. Pope, Jr, M.D. The authors are grateful to Dr. Jean Walker Macfarlane for her editorial contributions to this article." (p. 143).

- Laforge, R; Leary, TF; Naboisek, H; Coffey, HS; Freedman, MB (1954). "The interpersonal dimension of personality: II. An objective study of repression". J Pers. 23: 129–53. doi:10.1111/j.1467-6494.1954.tb01144.x. PMID 13222223..

"The studies on which this paper is based have been sponsored by Kaiser Foundation Hospital, Oakland, California, under the direction of Harvey Powelson, M.D., and were supported in part by Research Grant MH-331 from the National Institute of Mental Health, Public Health Service, under the direction of Hubert S. Coffey, Ph.D., and Saxton T. Pope, Jr., M.D." (p. 129).

- Leary, T; Coffey, HS (1955). "Interpersonal diagnosis: some problems of methodology and validation". J Abnorm Psychol. 50: 110–24. doi:10.1037/h0049357. PMID 13232939..
- "The Cyber-Punk: The Individual as Reality Pilot" (PDF). Mississippi Review. 16 (2/3): 252–265. 1988. JSTOR 20134179.

=== Magazines ===
- "The Seers' Catalog." Omni (January 1987). Cover art.

== Books ==
- The Interpersonal Diagnosis of Personality (1957)
- The Psychedelic Experience: A Manual Based on the Tibetan Book of the Dead, with Ralph Metzner and Richard Alpert) (1964). ISBN 0806516526.
- Leary, Timothy; Metzner, Ralph; Weil, Gunther M., eds. (1965). The Psychedelic Reader: Classic Selections from the Psychedelic Review. University books.

The Board of Editors has selected the especially important articles from the first four issues of the Psychedelic Review and published them under one cover.
Republished in 1993 by Citadel Press.

- Psychedelic Prayers after the Tao Te Ching. Poets Press (1966)
- Start Your Own Religion. Millbrook, New York: Kriya Press (1967)

The original 1967 version was privately published. It is not to be confused with a compilation of Leary's writings compiled, edited, and published posthumously under the same title.

- The Politics of Ecstasy. G. P. Putnam (1968). ISBN 091417133X.

The first eleven chapters were re-published as Politics of Ecstasy in 1990 and the final eleven chapters as Tune In, Turn On, Drop Out in 1999.

- High Priest (1968). ISBN 0914171801.
- Jail Notes (1970). Preface by Allen Ginsberg. Douglas Book Corp.
- Confessions of a Hope Fiend. New York: Bantam Books (1973). ISBN 978-0552680707. OCLC 876688.
- Neurologic (with Joanna Leary) (1973)
- StarSeed (1973)
- Mystery, Magic & Miracle: Religion in a Post-Aquarian Age (with Edward F. Heenan and Jack Fritscher. Prentice-Hall (1973). ISBN 013609032X.
- What Does WoMan Want?: Adventures Along the Schwarzchild Radius (1976)

His only novel, revised and reprinted in 1987 by New Falcon Publications in Tempe, Arizona.

- The Periodic Table of Evolution (1977)
- Exo-Psychology: A Manual on The Use of the Nervous System According to the Instructions of the Manufacturers. Los Angeles: Starseed/Peace Press (1977). ISBN 1561841056.

Republished as Info-Psychology in 1987 by Falcon Press Publications in Tempe, Arizona.

- Neuropolitics: The Sociobiology of Human Metamorphosis (with Robert Anton Wilson and George A. Koopman. Los Angeles: Starseed/Peace Press (1977). ISBN 978-0915238187.

Edited by Daniel Gilbertson and George A. Koopman, designed and illustrated by Cynthia Marsh.
Revised and republished as Neuropolitique in 1988 by Falcon Press Publications.

- The Game of Life. Culver City, Calif.: Peace Press (1979)
- Neurocomics. San Francisco, CA: Last Gasp Eco-Funnies (1979).

A comic book version of The Game of Life (1979).
Script by Timothy Leary, Pete von Sholly and George DiCaprio. Artwork by Pete von Sholly. Cover painting, panel border inking and lettering by Tim Kummero.

- The Intelligence Agents. Culver City, Calif.: Peace Press (1979)

Republished in 1996 by New Falcon Publications in Tempe, Arizona.

- Changing My Mind Among Others. Prentice Hall (1982). ISBN 0131278290.
- Flashbacks. Tarcher (1983). ISBN 0874771773.
- Info-Psychology. Tempe, Ariz.: Falcon Press Publications (1987)

Revision of Exo-Psychology: A Manual on The Use of the Nervous System According to the Instructions of the Manufacturers. Los Angeles: Starseed/Peace Press (1977). ISBN 1561841056.

- Neuropolitique (with Robert Anton Wilson and George A. Koopman. Falcon Press (1988). ISBN 1-56184-012-2.

Revision of Neuropolitics: The Sociobiology of Human Metamorphosis (1977) with new introduction.

- Leary, Timothy; Metzner, Ralph; Weil, Gunther M., eds. (1993). The Psychedelic Reader: Classic Selections from the Psychedelic Review. Citadel Press. ISBN 978-0-8065-1451-2.
- Timothy Leary's Greatest Hits, Volume 1. Monographs, 1980-1990 (with Vicki Marshall and Ron Lawrence). Studio City, CA: KnoWare (1990).

Collector's note: «A seemingly self-produced collection of essays: ringbound sheets produced by a Los Angeles couple's desktop publishing program in 1990. Scarce: there is no indication of how many of these were done, but it is doubtful it had any widespread distribution, rather it seems more akin to the "print-on-demand" phenomenon that has become commonplace now, nearly two decades later. Signed by author.»
It contains ten essays, all of which were later included in the book Chaos and Cyber Culture (1994).

- Chaos and Cyber Culture (with Michael Horowitz and Vicki Marshall). Ronin Publishing (1994). (ISBN 0-914171-77-1)
- Surfing the Conscious Nets: A Graphic Novel (with Robert Williams). Last Gasp (1995). ISBN 0867194103.
- A Letter from Timothy Leary to Aldous Huxley. Leary Archives Press (1996).

Limited-edition publication includes the 1960 letter.

- Concrete & Buckshot: William S. Burroughs Paintings. Leary, Timothy and Benjamin Weissman. 1996. Smart Art Press. (ISBN 1-889195-01-4)
- Design for Dying, with R. U. Sirius. HarperCollins (1997). ISBN 006018700X, 0060928662, 0060182504.
- The Politics of Ecstasy. Foreword by Tom Robbins. Introductions by R. U. Sirius and Timothy Leary. (Berkeley, Calif.: Ronin Publishing (1990).

"Collector's Note: The original edition of The Politics of Ecstasy has been divided into two books. This abbreviated edition carries the original title of Politics of Ecstasy and contains chapters 1 to 11 of the original. The remaining material appears in a companion book entitled Tune In, Turn On, Drop Out containing Chapters 12 to 22 of the original text."

- The Delicious Grace of Moving One's Hand: The Collected Sex Writings. Thunder's Mouth Press (1999). ISBN 1560251816.
- Turn On, Tune In, Drop Out. Ronin Publishing (1999). ISBN 1579510094.

The original edition of The Politics of Ecstasy was divided into two books by Ronin Publishing. The first abbreviated edition carried the original title of Politics of Ecstasy and contained chapters 1 to 11 of the original. The remaining material appeared in this companion book entitled Tune In, Turn On, Drop Out, and contained Chapters 12 to 22 of the original text.

- Change Your Brain. (with Beverly A. Potter). Ronin Publishing (2001)
- Politics of Self-Determination. (with Beverly A. Potter). Ronin Publishing (2001). ISBN 1579510159.
- The Politics of Psychopharmacology. (with Beverly A. Potter). Ronin Publishing (2001). ISBN 1579510566.
- Musings on Human Metamorphoses (with Beverly A. Potter). Ronin Publishing (2003). ISBN 1579510582.
  - Note: "Material in this book was excerpted from Changing My Mind Among Others (1988) by Timothy Leary"
- Evolutionary Agents (with Beverly A. Potter). Ronin Publishing (2004). ISBN 1579510647.

== Book contributions ==
- Foreword to Cosmic Trigger I: The Final Secret of The Illuminati, by Robert Anton Wilson. New York: And/or (1977), pp. ix-xiii.
- Afterword to The Lost Beatles Interviews, by Geoffrey Giuliano, Brenda Giuliano. Plume (1996). ISBN 0452270251.

== Other publications ==
=== Dissertations ===
- The Social Dimensions of Personality: Group Process and Structure (Ph.D. Dissertation). University of California, Berkeley (1950).

=== Journal issues as editor ===
- Journal of Social Issues, vol. 6, no. 1, Community Service and Social Research – Group Psychotherapy in a Church Program (1950).

Issue edited with Hubert Coffey and Mervin Freedman. Published by the Society for the Psychological Study of Social Issues.

== Non-print creative works ==
=== Discography ===
- The Psychedelic Experience: A Manual Based on the Tibetan Book of the Dead (with Richard Alpert & Ralph Metzner) (1966)

Reissued on CD in 2003.

- L.S.D. (1966)
- Turn On, Tune In, Drop Out (The Original Motion Picture Soundtrack). Mercury Records (1967). Full audio.

Ostensibly a "user manual" for a self-guided LSD "trip". While the album did poorly in general release, it has become one of the rarest "memorabilia" items from Leary's work. One track, "All The Girls Are Yours" has been performed repeatedly by others, and was re-recorded in 2004.

- You Can Be Anyone This Time Around (1970)
- Seven Up. Ash Ra Tempel (1972)
- Flashbacks (1983)
- The Inner Frontier (with Robert Anton Wilson) (ACE Tapes, 1988)
- From Psychedelics to Cybernetics (ACE Tapes, 1989)
- The Origins of Dance (with The Grid) (1990)
- Uncommon Quotes: Timothy Leary (Pub Group West, 1990) ISBN 0929856015.
- How to Operate Your Brain (ACE Tapes, 1992)
- Right to Fly (1996)
- Beyond Life With Timothy Leary. Mouth Almighty with Mercury Records (1996)

"Beyond Life with Timothy Leary celebrates the life, death and after-life of Timothy Leary. The spiritual quality of this album, both musically and lyrically, characterizes it as a conceptual album, one that must be experienced from start to finish, in the tradition of a Pink Floyd album. Its ethereal quality makes this album a unique collection of dance-trance masterpieces intermixed with the best of Timothy Leary. The album features the Moody Blues' new version of their classic "Legend of a Mind," a new cut by Al Jourgensen (Ministry), and a tribute from Allen Ginsberg."

- Timothy Leary Live at Starwood. Association for Consciousness Exploration. ISBN 1591570026.

Recorded and released on cassette in 1992, and later released on CD in 2001.

- Timothy Leary: A Cheerleader for Change (ACE Tapes, with Llewellyn Collection, 2001). ISBN 1591570042.

Recorded in 1985.

==== Also appears on ====
- Leary sings in the chorus of John Lennon's 1969 song "Give Peace a Chance".
- Samples of Leary speaking appear on Tune In (Turn On The Acid House) [12" EP]. Psychic TV / Temple Records (UK) (1988)
- Trance-Techno Express: From Detroit to Berlin & Back. Various (1993)
- "The Incredible Lightness of Being Molecular," the opening track on Fifty Years of Sunshine (1993)

A CD that celebrated the invention of LSD. Recorded in Los Angeles by Genesis P-Orridge and Doug Rushkoff on March 14, 1993. Written by Dr. Timothy Leary for the special publication Lysergic Times, edited by Michael Horowitz to commemorate 50 years of LSD, and launched on April 16, 1993 in San Francisco, USA.

- Guest vocalist on "Gila Copter", the opening track of the Revolting Cocks' album Linger Ficken' Good... and Other Barnyard Oddities (1993)
- Ancient Lights and the Blackcore, with Scorn, Seefeel, Yanomami Shamans from the Amazon, and DJ Cheb I. Sabbah (1995)
- Krautrock. Various [Polygram] (1997)
- Sub Rosa Underwood, Vol. 3: A Sampler. Various (1998)
- Intermenstral. Various (2001)

=== Filmography ===
- A full list of appearances (both as himself and in acting roles), direction, and other participation in film and television media by Leary can be found at:

=== Multimedia performances ===
- During late 1966 and early 1967, Leary toured college campuses presenting a multi-media performance called "The Death of the Mind," which attempted to artistically replicate the LSD experience.
- In the early 1990s, Leary created several films in a form of hypnosis-tape he referred to as "Retinal Logic". These included Think for Yourself, How to Operate your Brain, and How to Operate your Brain Show (the final being a Public Access Television version of its namesake). Each video is presented as a lecture and demo of technological delivery method for hypnopædic learning. The videos include a barrage of colors, and early examples of Binural Entrainment

=== Computer games ===
- Relax is a stress reduction system with game elements programmed by Timothy Leary for the Commodore 64. The game includes an audio cassette and a headband with an EMG device that connects to a joystick port. There are three sequences: a psychedelic kaleidoscope, a graph showing the player's relaxation level, and a balloon popping mini-game that keeps track of the player's score. It was released by Synapse Software in 1984.
- Equal parts party game, roleplaying game and social simulation, Timothy Leary's Mind Mirror was released for Commodore 64, Atari XL, Apple II, and MS-DOS computers by Electronic Arts in 1985. The game was a digital reinterpreting of Leary's doctoral thesis. He later stated that he had plans to release an updated version of the program with advanced graphics (including Apple Macintosh and Amiga versions), but that never occurred. Timothy Leary's estate reported that the rights to the game were given back to their original programmers, who in-turn were attempting to update the program for a modern audience. This project evolved into "Mind Mirror 6"
