= Psychedelics Encyclopedia =

- Author: Peter Stafford
- Language: English
- Subject: Psychedelic drugs
- Genre: Non-fiction
- Publisher: And/Or Press (1st edition)
- Publication date: 1977 (1st edition)
- Publication place: Berkeley, California
- Pages: 384 pages (1st edition); 511 pages (3rd edition)
- ISBN: 9780915904211
- OCLC: 3446971
- Website: 1st ed. (1977); 2nd ed. (1983); 3rd ed. (1992)
- Published in three successive editions: 1st (1977), 2nd (1983), and 3rd (1992).

Psychedelics Encyclopedia is a book about psychedelic drugs and other hallucinogens written by Peter Stafford. It was first published in 1977 by And/Or Press, with a second revised edition published in 1983 by J.P. Tarcher and a third expanded edition published in 1992 by Ronin Publishing.

The book has chapters on LSD, mescaline, cannabis, psilocybin, nutmeg and MDA, MDMA, DMT and other short-acting tryptamines, ayahuasca and harmala alkaloids, ibogaine, Amanita mushrooms and soma, and other hallucinogenic drugs such as anticholinergic deliriants and ketamine.

Book reviews have been published, including one by Richard Evans Schultes. The book was once described as a "standard text" in the psychedelic community along with other notable works such as Jonathan Ott's Pharmacotheon and Alexander Shulgin's PiHKAL and TiHKAL.

Subsequent to the publication of the final edition of Psychedelics Encyclopedia, Stafford adapted chapters from the book into two new shorter books, Psychedelics (2003) about LSD and Magic Mushrooms (2003) about psilocybin-containing mushrooms, both likewise published by Ronin Publishing.

== See also ==
- List of psychedelic literature
