= 2001 (Vibravoid album) =

Studio album by Vibravoid
- Released: 2000
- Recorded: 1997–1999
- Studios: Das Kleine Analoge, Düsseldorf
- Genres: Neo-psychedelic rock, neo-kraut rock
- Length: 48:26
- Labels: Triggerfish Music, Nasoni Records, Fall Out Boy Records, Krauted Mind Records, Stoned Karma Records
- Producer: Christian Koch

Vibravoid chronology
2001 (2000)	Void Vibration (2002)

2001 is the debut album by the Düsseldorf-based band Vibravoid. Released in 2000, it is stylistically classified as neo-psychedelic and neo-kraut rock, and is regarded in retrospective critical analysis as pioneers of the vinyl revival in Germany.

== History ==
2001 was recorded between 1997 and 1999 in Düsseldorf Germany entirely on analogue equipment at Das Kleine Analoge Studio. The album features Vom Ritchie (Dr. and The Medics, Die Toten Hosen) on drums. The analogue tapes were mastered by Kurt Dahlke (Pyrolator, Der Plan) at Ata Tak Studio. The album also features New York artist Mary Buck (cover artist for Die Krupps) on one track.

The album was presented on German national TV as part of a feature on the Düsseldorf music scene on VIVA TV in an episode of Wah Wah before its release in the year 1999.

According to the band, the album was initially released independently by the band because no record label was willing to release it. The album was released in 2000 by the band via Triggerfish Records. In 2001, during a period of declining vinyl sales, the album was released through Nasoni Records on blue (playing from inside out) and yellow vinyl (playing from outside in).

The album sleeve showcases vintage effect pedals from the 1970s such as tape delays, fuzz pedals and phaser units as well as vintage "space age" furniture. These effects were used to record the album and helped to create the analog sound. In addition to poster and lyric sheet the album contains a printed transparency with graphic patterns that can be moved over one side of the inner gatefold sleeve to create op art effects. The album was produced in Grundig 4D Stereo sound.

The record release party was held on 17. November 2000 at the Ratinger Hof, which is regarded as the birthplace of German Punk. The album release party was documented as the first new rock concert at Ratinger Hof after a ten-year period dominated by Techno in the 1990s.

In 2005 the album was re-released for the Japanese market on Fall Out Boy Records.

In 2015 the album was re-released as a 4LP boxset featuring live and demo recordings from the early 1990s.

In 2020 the album was planned to be re-released as 2001 (The 30th Anniversary Archive Collection) 3 LP set including the unreleased 1994 album and extra tracks. Due to production (indicated by the copyright dates) the album was delayed until January 2021

== Reception ==
2001 has retrospectively been described as a landmark of the Düsseldorf neo-kraut rock and neo-psychedelia and was also reviewed in the major German magazines such as Techno magazine Rave Line although not being Techno, Visions magazine compared the album to Kraut Rock album Die Grüne Reise by Achim Reichel and Syd Barrett, Eclipsed magazine. and Ox-Fanzine

Later anniversary editions and reissues were reviewed in publications including German RockTimes, British Record Collector magazine said "It’s the convergence of timelines where 60s and 70s psychedelia merge into the contemporary, and it’s just all one delightfully rewarding trip" and music websites such as Prog Archives, TimeMachine Productions described 2001 as "the album that opened the Gates so Psychedelia could enter the 21st Century".

The album also received international reviews in underground press. UK magazine Bad Acid reviewed the album in its 2002 issue. The Greek Gew Gaw fanzine wrote "Although their music seemingly draws on the sixties, they nevertheless give me the impression that they are the band that first played this kind of music".

== Track listing ==
=== Compact Disc edition (2000) ===
The original CD first edition contains 9 tracks:

No.	Title	Length
1.	"Three Minutes For A Free Tibet"	3:00
2.	"(She's Just) 13"	4:36
3.	"Mystery Ship"	3:02
4.	"Inside The Electric Mind"	5:28
5.	"Lovely Lady Deb O'nair"	5:51
6.	"Ballspeaker"	7:27
7.	"Psychodrome"	5:40
8.	"Wokboy"	5:09
9.	"The Tascam Mantra"	6:48
Total length:		48:26

=== First edition (2001) and Japanese Edition (2005) ===
The original vinyl release through Nasoni Records and the Japanese version from 2005 use the following track listing:

No.	Title	Length
1.	"A1 Three Minutes For A Free Tibet"	3:00
2.	"A2 (She's Just) 13"	4:36
3.	"A3 Mystery Ship"	3:02
4.	"A4 Lovely Lady Deb O'nair"	5:51
5.	"A5 Ballspeaker Part 1"	3:40
6.	"B1 Ballspeaker Part 2"	3:47
7.	"B2 Inside The Electric Mind"	5:28
8.	"B3 Psychodrome"	5:40
9.	"B4 Wokboy"	5:09
10.	"B5 The Tascam Mantra"	6:48
