= Listi =

Listi is a surname. Notable people with the surname include:

- Brad Listi, American author and podcast host
- László Listi (1628–1662), Hungarian poet
