= Lords of the Deep =

1989 film

- VHS release cover
- Directed by: Mary Ann Fisher
- Written by: Howard R. Cohen; Daryl Haney
- Produced by: Roger Corman
- Starring: Bradford Dillman; Priscilla Barnes; Daryl Haney; Melody Ryane; Eb Lottimer
- Cinematography: Austin McKinney
- Edited by: Nina Gilberti
- Music by: Jim Berenholtz
- Production company: New Horizons Pictures
- Distributed by: Concorde Pictures
- Release date: April 21, 1989
- Running time: 78 minutes
- Country: United States
- Language: English

Lords of the Deep is a 1989 American science-fiction horror film co-produced by Roger Corman and starring Bradford Dillman and Priscilla Barnes, about an underwater colony being attacked by alien life forms.

It was one of several underwater-themed films released around 1989; similar films distributed during that time included The Abyss, Leviathan, DeepStar Six, The Evil Below, and The Rift.

== Plot ==
Set on board an undersea laboratory in a near-future ocean where the Earth's ozone layer has been depleted and new means of habitation and survival are being explored, biologist Dr. Claire McDowell is working on an unknown specimen when she experiences psychic visions. Meanwhile, a routine crew replacement is inbound in a mini submarine when an undersea quake occurs, knocking out communication with the surface. Contact is lost with the sub and a search sub is sent out to investigate the silence, while Raymond Chadwick, one of the lab's crew, works on exterior repairs in a diving suit. The search sub discovers the relief sub is now derelict and the hatch blown with no sign of the crew and is promptly attacked by large, stingray-like creatures. After repelling one creature with an electrical discharge, the second sub is overpowered by more of the rays and contact is lost again.

Chadwick, who is still working outside the lab, is then attacked and the crew find him half out of the lab's moon pool. When his mask is removed, he is revealed to have been totally transformed into a gelatinous mass. Commander Stuart Dobler orders the mass quarantined, but Claire and medical officer Dr. Barbara Stottelmyre override him and the mass is moved to the lab, where it is discovered to be both identical in composition to the substance Claire was studying, and also to be mutating into a man-sized stingray-like creature.

Dobler decides evacuate the base, leaving the creature for another team to deal with. He sends another member of the crew, Fernandez, to retrieve the abandoned crew shuttle, but he is attacked and seemingly killed in the attempt.

Dobler decides to kill the creature by draining the water and air from its tank and tries to make the crew sign non-disclosure agreements. Claire refuses, claiming “the world has a right to know”, and all but one of the other crew side with her.

The ship’s computer, Trilby, informs them the tank is empty but cannot confirm the creature’s death. On inspection they discover the creature has escaped from the tank and is loose onboard the base. They split up and search for it.

Trilby informs Claire of potential impressions in the R & D room. Seaver goes to investigate, but as soon as he enters is locked in. He is discovered dead shortly after, and Dobler denies an autopsy. Meanwhile, Claire encounters the creature and learns that they have a colony on the seabed which she steals a sub to visit.

Claire’s lover, Jack O’Neill, is discovered unconscious ostensibly after an encounter with the creature. However, it is revealed to be a ruse and he conspires with Dr Stottelmyer to get some answers. He tells her to perform an autopsy on Seaver while he goes to the Computer Annex to look through the classified files.

Claire reaches the colony and finds Chadwick and Fernandez alive and well. Chadwick explains that the creatures abducted him as they needed a way to get onto the base.

Stottelmyre determines that Seaver died from asphyxiation and asks Trilby if there were any drops in the oxygen levels. Trilby responds that the room was sealed and drained of oxygen on the orders of Commander Dobler. However, before the Doctor can tell anyone, Dobler, who was monitoring the whole exchange, has her asphyxiated too.

Meanwhile at the colony, Chadwick explains to Claire that the creatures are benevolent. Their purpose on Earth is to help humanity overcome its own ecological issues, and that they infiltrated the lab to warn them that a massive earthquake is incoming which will destroy it.

Dobler discovers that Claire has gone and goes to confront Jack, who has learnt that the US Navy and Martel Corporation were well aware of the “unidentified life form” on the seabed. Dobler explains that the replacement crew were meant to deal with the aliens, but with them gone he now intends to destroy them. He subdues Jack and orders the one remaining crew member still loyal to him, Engel, to take another sub and find Claire. However, the sub is attacked by the creatures and Dobler loses contact. He then calls his immediate superior at Martel, revealing he had been in contact with them the entire time, and learns he is to be replaced.

Claire returns to the base to try and warn them, and finds Dobler on the brink of madness. She discovers the dead crew and Jack injured, and tries to escape with him. Dobler tries to seal them in a corridor and asphyxiate them. Jack escapes through an air vent into the computer room and shuts down Trilby, while the creature saves Claire.

The pair reach the submarine bay and escape to the colony, while Dobler is killed as the earthquake hits the lab.

Claire receives a final vision in which the aliens reveal that they were once the dominant life form on their own planet but destroyed it through selfishness and greed, forcing them to flee to Earth, and they now wish to prevent the same fate befalling humanity. They reach the colony and reunite with Fernandez, Engel, and Chadwick.

== Cast ==
- Bradford Dillman as Stuart Dobler
- Priscilla Barnes as Dr. Claire McDowell
- Daryl Haney as Jack O'Neill
- Melody Ryane as Dr. Barbara Stottelmyre
- Eb Lottimer as Thomas Seaver
- Greg Sobeck as Stanley Engel
- Richard Young as Raymond Chadwick
- Stephen Davies as Robert Fernandez
- Roger Corman as Corporate executive (uncredited)

== Production ==
The movie was announced in 1982. In 1989 Roger Corman said:

I had a first draft script, didn't like it, and put it on the shelf. About a year ago I brought it back, because I had some new ideas. Weirdly enough, the biggest of the underwater films is being done by my ex-assistants, producer Gale Hurd and Jim Cameron. We'll be out well ahead of them, however.

Director Mary Ann Fisher was a long time employee of Roger Corman. She was in charge of his studio in Venice and worked on such films as Battle Beyond the Stars, Forbidden World, Space Riders and Love Letters.

Filming took place in Los Angeles in November 1988.

Future two-time Academy Award winner Janusz Kamiński served as the director of photography on the second unit crew for about two weeks of the four-week shooting schedule, in what was one of his first movies as a director of photography. According to a crew member who was present during production, Kamiński's footage was simply "too good" and did not match up well with the first-unit footage. Kamiński was taken off the crew before shooting was completed, but his footage was edited into the final film and can be spotted for its mysterious lighting and camera movements, though he is uncredited.

Another double Oscar winner (Aliens & Terminator 2) Robert Skotak, along with his brother Dennis Skotak, created the underwater visual effects for the film. When asked by the same crew member why he chose to work on such a low-budget film, Skotak said: "It's four weeks paid work, and on a Roger Corman movie, you get to work with people on their way up, and on their way down."

== Legacy ==
The film is one of six movies featured in season 12 of Mystery Science Theater 3000.

== Reception ==
Variety called it "meek, unsuspenseful... pic behaves like a sprung spring flopping around. Even at a scant 82 minutes, it has scenes that drop their pacing to an embarrassing degree."

The Daytona Daily News said the film "makes even the cheesiest of the 1950s submarine films look good by comparison.

In Creature Feature, the movie was given one out of five stars, finding it to be an uninspired quickie.

== See also ==
- List of underwater science fiction works

== Notes ==
- Koetting, Christopher T. (2013). Mind warp! : the fantastic true story of Roger Corman's New World Pictures.
