= Banned for Life =

Book by Daryl Haney

- Author: D. R. Haney
- Language: English
- Genre: novel
- Publisher: And/Or Press
- Publication date: 9 May 2009
- Publication place: United States of America
- Media type: Print
- Pages: 416
- ISBN: 978-1-4276-2499-4

Banned for Life is a novel by American writer D. R. Haney, published by And/Or Press in 2009. Primarily set in New York City and Los Angeles, the book is a first-person account of a musician-turned-filmmaker's immersion in the punk-rock scene of the 1980s and his subsequent struggles in Hollywood.

Haney has said it required nine years to complete the novel, which was well received by the underground music press and has been called a "cult favorite" by the New York Journal of Books.

== Plot summary ==
As a restless high school athlete in a small, unnamed town in North Carolina, Jason Maddox, the book's narrator, has a sexual encounter with his popular girlfriend's alcoholic mother. Rumors of the encounter circulate at school, and Jason's girlfriend, distraught when she learns of them, attempts suicide. Jason, himself previously popular, is shunned by his classmates, and after confronting and savagely beating the classmate who started the rumors, Jason is arrested, expelled from school, and all but disowned by his conservative, mortified parents.

Taking a job as a house painter, Jason moves into an apartment complex where he befriends one of his new neighbors, Bernard “Peewee” Mash, an intellectually precocious fifteen-year-old who, like Jason, is a local pariah. Peewee introduces Jason to art, literature, and, most importantly, punk rock. He and Jason are particularly enamored of the Los Angeles punk band Rule of Thumb, which is led by a UC Berkeley-educated poet, Jim Cassady, who is revered by both Jason and Peewee.

Learning that Rule of Thumb will be performing at New York City's CBGB, Jason quits his job in order to drive himself and Peewee to New York. After the show, they speak to Jim Cassady, who advises them to start a band. They immediately make plans to move to New York, where they live on the Lower East Side, center of the New York punk scene. There, Peewee becomes increasingly difficult, at odds with Jason musically and jealous of Jason's sexual prowess. Alternately given to tantrums and sullen silences, Peewee is ousted from the band that he co-founded. He and Jason pursue music separately until, recognizing how much they miss each other, they reconcile and start a new band. Banned from most local venues because of its explosive, destructive shows, the band begins touring the U.S., and in the midst of what will prove to be its final tour, Peewee is killed in a car crash, with Jason narrowly surviving.

Devastated, Jason decides he's finished with music and, using money from an insurance settlement, he produces and directs a film that takes him to Los Angeles, where he falls in love with an aspiring actress who is herself seeking a new life after fleeing the civil wars in her native Yugoslavia. The actress, Irina, is married to a wealthy Englishman who is happily unaware of her affair with Jason and, possibly, others prior. Their stormy romance is addictive to Jason, who begs Irina to leave her husband for him. She repeatedly and emptily assures him she will.

At a party one night, Jason meets another former punk who tells him that Jim Cassady has recently been spotted, homeless and panhandling on the streets of Hollywood. This is the first sighting of Cassady, as far as Jason knows, since Rule of Thumb disbanded in the early 80s. Jason has always been mystified and intrigued by Cassady's disappearance, and he determines to find him, eventually discovering that Cassady is now living in a bleak Los Angeles suburb with his elderly mother. Cassady shares some of his recent songs and poems with Jason, who thinks they're deserving of a wide audience. Except for Cassady's music and the advice he gave Jason and Peewee at CBGB almost twenty years before, Jason might still be miserable in North Carolina, and he means to express his gratitude by helping Cassady gain a new following.

But Cassady is resigned to obscurity, and he grudgingly submits to Jason's efforts on his behalf. Perhaps out of spite, he causes a rupture in Jason's relationship with Irina, and Jason promises to kill him for it, only to reaffirm, in the book's epilogue, how indebted he is to Cassady, who has again changed the course of his life.

== Critical reception ==
Maximum RocknRoll cited the writing of Banned for Life as being “realistic” and “spot on,” with a “damn good” presentation of the punk scene, singling out the book's “nuanced, interesting” characters, who invite the reader to “actually care about what’s going to happen to them.” Razorcake said the book “reaches across the punk divide,” and commended Haney for his “strong voice” and for not “whining about the good old days,” just as Big Wheel praised Haney for incorporating “social and political messages into the book without ever coming off as too preachy," while praising the book itself as an “engaging page turner.”

Beyond the underground music press, the book received favorable Internet notice from such websites as Largehearted Boy, Three Guys One Book, and The Next Best Book Blog, where the reviewer said of it: “Once I started, I knew I was not going to want it to end. It called to me every time I put it down. It begged. It screamed. I savored every moment of it, and I dreaded reading that final sentence."
