= Vibravoid =

German neo-psychedelia band

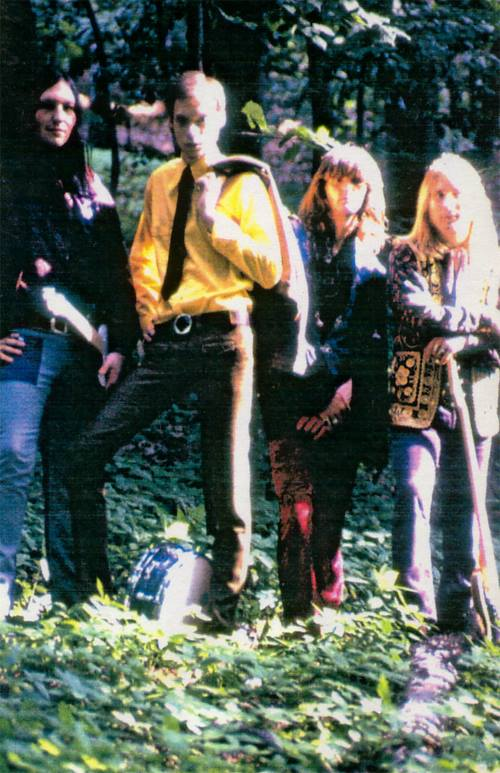
- Vibravoid in early 1990

Background information
- Origin: Düsseldorf, Germany
- Genres: Neo-psychedelia, Kraut Rock, Acid rock, Space rock
- Years active: 1988–present
- Labels: Stoned Karma Records, Tonzonen Records, Sulatron Records, Nasoni Records
- Members: Christian Koch, Frank Matenaar, Dario Treese
- Past members: Thomas Pojonie, Oliver Lück, Lutz Dittmann, Martin Lammert, Marion Spittler, Sven Sensch, Markus Ludwig, Dinko Vekic

Vibravoid is a Neo-psychedelia and Neo-Kraut Rock band from Düsseldorf, Germany, formed in 1988 under the name Lightshow Society Düsseldorf. In music journalism, the group is frequently described as Germany's oldest active neo-psychedelic band credited with coining the term "Neo-Kraut Rock" and noted for predating the modern scene through their early recordings.

== History ==
The band was formed in 1990 by Christian Koch (guitar, vocals), Thomas Pojonie (bass), Oliver Lück (drums), and Lutz Dittmann (organ). Until 1996, the group simultaneously operated under the names Motley Motion and Void Forum. Vibravoid described their musical style as "Neo-Kraut Rock", using the original spelling of the term. Contemporary reception took up this specific genre definition in 2009 and described the niche position of Kraut Rock in Germany compared to other European countries as follows:

"Während es in Großbritannien ganze Kraut Rock-Partys gibt, fristet die Musikrichtung in ihrer deutschen Heimat ein Nischendasein. Die Düsseldorfer Band Vibravoid hat nun alte Can- und Amon Düül-Songs interpretiert und das Ganze mit neuer Coolness aufgeladen."

English translation: "While there are entire Kraut Rock parties in Great Britain, the musical genre leads a niche existence in its German homeland. The Düsseldorf band Vibravoid has now interpreted old Can and Amon Düül songs and charged the whole thing with a new coolness."

— PRINZ magazine, issue 10/09

Ten years before the recent psych rock revival started in 2010, the contemporary music press ranked Vibravoid, along with Liquid Visions and the Mandra Gora Lightshow Society, as "the leading German acid sound triumvirate", certifying that these three formations perfectly embodied contemporary psychedelic rock in all its facets.

The music magazine GoodTimes noted in 2013 that, in the course of the general retro wave in rock music, “an armada of Black Sabbath-Mountain-Grand Funk-Zeppelin clones” was sweeping across the landscape, while the newly flourishing psychedelic scene almost stood out as something of its own. “In Germany, Vibravoid play a key role in this.”

The rock magazine eclipsed stated in “Die Geschichte des Krautrock von 1980 bis heute – das Neokraut” ("The story of Krautrock since 1980 - the Neokraut) that Vibravoid had given psychedelic rock an “enormous upgrade” and listed their album 2001 in the “Top 10 Neo Kraut” as the earliest work.

In their founding year of 1990, the group began experimenting with audio-visual formats. While the founding members were still attending school, they produced the video for the track "Fernsehapparat" in rooms at Düsseldorf's Kikweg school. The piece combines early Neo-Kraut Rock with experimental video art and features light experiments by the Lightshow Society Düsseldorf.

In 1993, Dinko Vekic and later Markus Ludwig joined the band, both having previously been members of the Düsseldorf thrash metal band Assassin.

In 1994, Vibravoid recorded their first album, which remained unreleased until 25 years later. Similarly, the album Phasenvoid, containing recordings from the early 1990s, was released in 2003.

Vibravoid produced their debut album 2001 between 1997 and 1999 using analog equipment. Vom Ritchie (Doctor & the Medics, Die Toten Hosen) played drums and supported the band during live performances in 2000 and 2001. In December 1999, the German music channel VIVA TV produced an episode of Wah Wah series about the Düsseldorf music scene, during which the album 2001 was presented. Since no record label interested in neo-psychedelia and neo-Krautrock could be found at the time, the band self-released the album in 2000. The CD pressing of 2,000 copies sold out and the vinyl edition also went out of print. In 2005, a subsequent vinyl pressing was released specifically for the Japanese market.

A permanent element of Vibravoid is the Lightshow Society Düsseldorf, which provides an analog 1960s-style liquid light show during live performances. In the book Kiss The Sun by Davide Pansolin the band is credited with a significant influence on the development of stoner metal, although the group distances itself musically from the genre.

In 1996, Vibravoid organized an anniversary event in Düsseldorf for the 30th anniversary of London's UFO Club. In 2001, Vibravoid initiated the "Love Is Freedom" festival in Düsseldorf and later in Berlin, which operated as a Psych Fest following the peak era of techno culture. The inaugural edition featured Vibravoid, Mandra Gora Lightshow Society, and Liquid Visions.

On June 24, 2000, bandleader Christian Koch performed as a DJ at Bim Reinert's Creamcheese event as part of Düsseldorf's Nacht der Museen (Long Night of Museums) at the Museum Kunstpalast. Further collaborations with Creamcheese followed. On May 24, 2025, Vibravoid performed at the Creamcheese Mega Happening at the Blue Shell venue in Cologne.

In 2008, the band collaborated with founding member Sky Saxon of The Seeds. The resulting recordings (A Poetry Of Love) were released in 2010 as part of Saxon's final studio work.

In 2009, the band released the Kraut Rock Sensation EP in England, which featured cover versions of Kraftwerk ("Ruckzuck"), Can ("Mother Sky"), and Amon Düül II ("Eye Shaking King"). The tracks were later included on the album Distortions, which featured a 20-minute version of "Mother Sky".

That same year, the album Black Zodiac was released under the pseudonym Astrophobia.

Vibravoid performed at the Atomic Sunshine Festival at London's The Borderline on July 27, 2013. Mick Farren (The Deviants) suffered a heart attack during his performance at this festival and subsequently passed away.

Vibravoid has performed regularly at international festivals, including the Burg Herzberg Festival, Finkenbach Festival, Stoned From The Underground, and the Copenhagen Psych Fest. Several of these appearances have been released as live albums. The album Live at Finkenbach Festival 2015 reached number 2 on the official German vinyl charts.

In 2018, Vibravoid organized the Rheinkraut Festival in Düsseldorf to mark the 50th anniversary of Krautrock. The concert series featured Ax Genrich alongside newer bands, serving as the only comprehensive initiative marking the occasion during the anniversary year. The resulting album, Live at Rheinkraut Festival Düsseldorf 2018, reached the top 10 on the CD sales charts.

In late 2018, Vibravoid began producing the experimental silent film Im Zeichen des Zwilling, which features stylistic influences from the works of Karel Zeman. The film premiered on April 13, 2019, in Düsseldorf, followed by a screening in Wuppertal on May 20, 2023. The accompanying soundtrack was released as a double LP in 2020, featuring a booklet with image sequences from the film.

In September 2025, the band released the album Remove The Ties, which was noted in the international specialist press for its incorporation of the "Düsseldorf Sound".

On September 18, 2026, the studio album A Reason for Now was released via Tonzonen Records. Stylistically, the work combines elements of neo-psychedelic rock and neo-kraut rock with influences from the Düsseldorf school. The standard CD version, as well as the CD edition included as bonus material with the vinyl records, contain the experimental silent film Im Zeichen des Zwilling. In a review for the online music magazine Musikreviews.de, Marco Rauland described the album as a homogeneous combination of electronic elements, fuzz guitars, and repetitive rhythms, while noting the continuity of the formation after more than 35 years of existence. Critic Bernd Sievers, writing for the music magazine Eclipsed, considered Vibravoid a significant representative of neo-psychedelia on the occasion of this release. Furthermore, Andrea Valentini reviewed the album for the Italian music magazine Rumore, awarding it a score of 79/100 and praising its energetic garage rock style and uplifting mood, concluding that it is "better than Prozac".

== Vinyl Revival ==
Vibravoid played a role in the vinyl revival in the early 2000s by focusing on the vinyl medium and optical innovations. This includes, in particular, the use of Op-Art graphics and the introduction of "kinetic vinyl", where visual effects are generated by the rotation of the record. An early example of this approach is their debut album 2001 from 2000/2001. While the market for vinyl records was experiencing a historical low point at that time, the album was released on colored vinyl. Since the production of vinyl records barely played a role anymore, the pressing plant could only offer two different colors at that moment. This occurred counter to the preferences of the small collector scene at the time, which favored classic black vinyl.

== Discography ==
=== Tapes ===
- 1990: Overdue
- 1990: Vibravoid
- 1991: The Pepperland Four
- 1991: Hybrid
- 1991: Babyphase
- 1992: Krautfucktor
- 1992: Vibration From The Cosmic Void
- 1993: Motley Motion
- 1994: One Nation Underground
- 1994: Void Forum
- 1995: Psychodrome
- 1995: Void Vibration
- 1995: Vivid Visions
- 1996: Vibravoid II
- 1996: Quadrophonic Psychedelic Space Age Music
- 1996: A Variation Of The Void Vibration
- 1997: Tascam Recordings
- 1997: Tascam Mantras
- 1998: Another Variation Of The Void Vibration
- 1999: Klopfkäfer
- 1999: Music From The Year 2001

=== Studio ===
- 2000: 2001
- 2002: Void Vibration
- 2003: Phasenvoid (split LP with Sula Bassana)
- 2008: The Politics of Ecstasy
- 2009: Distortions
- 2010: A Poetry of Love (with Sky Saxon)
- 2011: Minddrugs
- 2012: Gravity Zero
- 2013: Delirio Dei Sensi
- 2016: Wake Up Before You Die
- 2017: Mushroom Mantras
- 2018: Vibrations from the Cosmic Void
- 2020: The Decomposition of Noise
- 2021: Zeitgeist Generator
- 2021: The Clocks That Time Forgot
- 2021: A Sparkle in the Twilight
- 2022: Phasenvoid (1992-1997 extended version)
- 2022: The Presidents of the Poison Air
- 2023: Edge Of Tomorrow
- 2024: We Cannot Awake
- 2025: Remove The Ties
- 2026: A Reason For Now

=== Singles and EPs ===
- 2001: Adjustment (7″)
- 2004: Doris Delay (7″)
- 2008: Christmas On Earth (7″)
- 2009: Kraut Rock Sensation EP (7")
- 2010: What Colour Is Pink? EP (7″)
- 2011: You Keep On Falling (7″)
- 2011: The White Ship (Split-EP with Drug Free Youth, 7″)
- 2013: Colour Your Mind EP (7″)
- 2014: Rheinflow (7″)
- 2015: Stepping Stone (7″)
- 2016: In A Gadda Da Vida (7″)
- 2017: Timemazine (Kinetic Op Art 7″)
- 2019: World Of Pain (7″)
- 2022: The Secret In Her Eyes (7″)

=== Live ===
- 2006: Triptamine E.P. Volume 1
- 2007: Triptamine E.P. Volume 2
- 2008: Triptamine E.P. Volume 3 - The Amsterdam Sessions
- 2009: Triptamine E.P. Volume 4 (with Sky Saxon)
- 2009: Triptamine CD
- 2010: Burg Herzberg Festival 2010
- 2011: Burg Herzberg Festival 2011
- 2013: Freak Out Bologna!
- 2014: Mindbenders – The Radio Sessions
- 2015: Loudness For the Masses – Live in Concert 2015
- 2015: Live at Finkenbach Festival 2015
- 2017: A Night at the Museum
- 2017: Triptamine E.P. Volume 5
- 2018: A Psychedelic Testament (with Sky Saxon)
- 2018: Live at Rheinkraut Festival Düsseldorf 2018
- 2019: Intergalactic Acid Freak Out Orgasms
- 2020: Triptamine E.P. Volume 6 - Out of Tune in Rosenheim
- 2021: Triptamine E.P. Volume 7 - Spicetrip
- 2025: Triptamine E.P. Volume 8 - Live At Duncker Berlin 2002

=== DVDs ===
- 2004: Maximum Void Vibration
- 2009: Triptamine

=== others ===
- 2003: Void Forum: Turned on Acid
- 2009: Astrophobia: Black Zodiac
