= And/Or Press =

Book publisher

- Status: defunct (1983)
- Founded: 1974
- Founder: Sebastian Orfali, John Orfali, Carlene Schnabel, Charly Jenkewitz
- Successor: Ronin Publishing
- Country of origin: United States
- Headquarters location: 2310 Haste Street; Berkeley, California 94704
- Key people: Sebastian Orfali, Beverly Potter
- Publication types: Books
- Nonfiction topics: Personal development, Psychedelic drugs, Countercultural lifestyle guides, Consciousness expansion, Spirituality
- Fiction genres: Underground comix

And/Or Press was an independent small press publisher based in the San Francisco Bay Area that operated from 1974 to 1983. The company published books on personal development, guides to the countercultural lifestyle, and consciousness expansion. A number of the company's books were on the psychedelic experience and related subjects. And/Or Press was also one of the first book publishers to embrace underground comix, publishing collections by Bill Griffith, Dave Sheridan, and Fred Schrier.

The company went out of business in 1983 after a hostile takeover; co-founder Joseph Sebastian Orfali and his partner Beverly Potter immediately founded Ronin Publishing, which picked up the mantle And/Or Press had established.

== Overview ==
A number of And/Or Press books on recreational drugs were high-volume sellers in the 1970s, including Mel Frank and Ed Rosenthal's The Indoor Highest Quality Marijuana Grower's Guide, D. Gold's Cannabis Alchemy, Adam Gottlieb's Legal Highs, and Peter Stafford's Psychedelics Encyclopedia. Edward Bauman, et al.'s The Holistic Health Handbook was a national bestseller. (And/Or Press published a number of books affiliated with the Berkeley Holistic Health Center.) The company republished Pitigrilli's 1933 book Cocaine, as well as original works by Ernest Callenbach, Paul Krassner, Dennis McKenna, Jacques Vallée, and Robert Anton Wilson.

== History ==
In 1973, Sebastian Orfali had owned People's Comix, a comic book retailer in San Francisco's North Beach.

In 1974, And/Or Press was founded as a cooperative in San Francisco by brothers Sebastian and John Orfali, Carlene Schnabel, and Charly Jenkewitz.

"And/Or’s first book would be Laughing Gas, a trade paperback issued in 1973, co-edited by David Wallechinsky, son of novelist Irving Wallace"

Among the first books the company published were Griffith and Kinney's Young Lust Reader, Pitigrilli's Cocaine, and W. Golden Mortimer's History of Coca. Most of their catalog was sold through head shops and other non-traditional venues.

By 1976 the company had moved to Berkeley, California. By this time, the company was also acting as a distributor of other publishers' books on affiliated topics. And/Or Press incorporated in 1978. By 1980 the company had six employees and did about $1 million in business per year, mostly in traditional bookstores.

In 1982, And/Or Press joined with three other Bay Area presses to form Network, Inc., a publishing cooperative designed to help small presses compete with larger publishing houses. Orfali became Network, Inc.'s chairman.

After the 1983 takeover of And/Or Press, Orfali and his long-time partner Beverly Potter, PhD, formed Ronin Publishing under a similar mission as its predecessor. Many And/Or Press books were republished by Ronin Publishing. Orfali died in 1997 at age 51.

== And/Or Press, Vancouver ==
In 2009, the name was revived by a Vancouver, British Columbia-based publisher. The new And/Or Press has so far published a novel by Daryl Haney (Banned for Life, 2009) and a guide to the Maya Embedded Language (Jana Germano's Simplifying Maya, 2016).

== Titles published (selected) ==
=== Nonfiction ===
- Cannabis Calendar 1974 through 1982
- Cocaine Calendar 1980 (1979)
- Bauman, Edward, Lorin Piper, and Armand Ian Brint, The Holistic Health Handbook: a Tool for Attaining Wholeness of Body, Mind, and Spirit (1978)
- Bauman, Edward; et. The Holistic Health Lifebook: a Guide to Personal and Planetary Well-Being: a Companion Volume to the Holistic Health Handbook (1981)
- Benares, Camden. Zen Without Zen Masters (1977)
- Berg, Rick. "The Art and Adventure of Traveling Cheaply" (1979)
- Callenbach, Ernest. The Ectopian Encyclopedia for the 80's: A Survival Guide to the Age of Inflation (Feb. 1981)
- Cherniak, Laurence. The Great Books of Hashish (1979)
- Cherniak, Laurence. The Great Books of Cannabis and Other Drugs, or, Researching the Pleasures of the High Society (1979)
- Clarke, Robert Connell. Marijuana Botany: an Advanced Study, the Propagation and Breeding of Distinctive Cannabis (1981)
- Epstein, Jack. Along the Gringo Trail: a Budget Travel Guide (1977)
- Frank, Mel and Ed Rosenthal. The Indoor Highest Quality Marijuana Grower's Guide (1975) — 14 printings
- Frank, Mel and Ed Rosenthal. Marijuana Grower's Guide (1978)
- Geis, Larry and Fabrice Florin; New Dimensions Foundation. Worlds Beyond: the Everlasting Frontier (1978)
- Geis, Larry, Alta P. Kelly, and Aiden A. Kelly. The New Healers: Healing the Whole Person (1980)
- Gold, D. Cannabis Alchemy: The Art of Modern Hashmaking (1979) — 10 printings
- Gold, E. J., Cybele Gold, and Jen-Ann Kirchmeier. Joyous Childbirth: Manual for Conscious Natural Childbirth (1977)
- Gottlieb, Adam, Legal Highs (1978) — 6 printings
- Krompotich. Traveling F.M. Radio Guide (1977)
- Lane, Earle. Electrophotography (1975)
- Lee, David. Cocaine Consumer's Handbook (1976)
- McKenna, Dennis (under the pseudonyms "OT Oss" and "ON Oeric"), Psilocybin: Magic Mushroom Grower's Guide (1976) ISBN 9780915904136.
- Mortimer, W. Golden, M.D. History of Coca: The Divine Plant of the Incas. 576 pp. (1974)
- Orfali, John and Sayre Van Young. Marijuana Datebook 1980 (1979)
- Richardson, Jim and Arik Woods. Sinsemilla: Marijuana Flowers (1976)
- Speeth, Kathleen Riordan. The Gurdjieff Work (1976)
- Stafford, Peter G. Psychedelics Encyclopedia (1977)
- Starks, Michael. Marijuana Potency (1977) ISBN 0-915904-27-6.
- Vallée, Jacques, Messengers of Deception: UFO Contacts and Cults (June 1979) ISBN 0-915904-38-1
- Vallee, Jacques. The Network Revolution: Confessions of a Computer Scientist (1982)
- Wilson, Robert Anton. The Illuminati Papers (1980) ISBN 1-57951-002-7
- Wilson, Robert Anton. Right Where You Are Sitting Now: Further Tales of the Illuminati (1982)
- Yu, F. L. T'ai chi Nude (1975)

=== Fiction ===
- Krassner, Paul (with illustrations by Trina Robbins) Tales of Tongue Fu (1981)
- Pitigrilli (Dino Segre). Cocaine (1974) — reissue of book originally published in 1933 by Greenberg

=== Comics collections ===
- Griffith, Bill; Kinney, Jay, eds. (1974). The Young Lust Reader. ASIN B000ZU1IP6.
- Griffith, Bill (1981). Zippy Stories. ISBN 978-0915904587.
- Griffith, Bill (1982). Zippy: Nation of Pinheads. ISBN 978-0915904716.
- Sheridan, Dave; Schrier, Fred (1974). The Overland Vegetable Stagecoach presents Mind Warp: An Anthology. OCLC 1945160.
