= Peter Stafford =

American journalist

- Born: George Leonard Sanford III; 1941; Oakland, California
- Died: July 20, 2007 (aged 68); Santa Cruz, California
- Education: Reed College
- Alma mater: University of Washington
- Occupation: Writer
- Writing career
- Notable work: Psychedelics Encyclopedia (1977, 1983, 1992)

Peter Stafford (1941 – July 20, 2007) was an American writer and author of the Psychedelics Encyclopedia (1977, 1983, 1992). Stafford is also co-author with Bonnie Golightly of LSD: The Problem-solving Psychedelic, as well as other books on psychedelics.

== Biography ==
Stafford was born in Oakland, California. He attended Reed College and graduated from the University of Washington.

In 1961, while at Reed College, Stafford experimented with the Native American sacred cactus Peyote. He moved to the East Village in New York City in 1964, where he spent the next ten years.

He was the editor of Crawdaddy! magazine from 1969 to 1970. He was a contributor to High Times.

In 1974, Stafford moved to Santa Cruz, California, with the intention of reconnecting with his father, whom he had not seen since early childhood.

Stafford died on July 20, 2007, in Santa Cruz, apparently from a complete heart block and injuries sustained falling from a ladder in his home.

== Selected works ==
- (with B. H. Golightly) LSD: The Problem-solving Psychedelic (1967) — also called LSD In Action (1969)
- Psychedelic Baby Reaches Puberty (1971).
- Psychedelics Encyclopedia (And/Or Press, 1977). ISBN 0-914171-51-8 — second edition in 1983 and then third edition in 1992 by Ronin Publishing ISBN 978-0-914171-51-5
- Magic Mushrooms (Ronin Publishing, 2003) ISBN 978-0914171195
- Psychedelics (Ronin Publishing, 2003). ISBN 0-914171-18-6
