= The Politics of Ecstasy (Vibravoid album) =

Studio album by Vibravoid
- Released: 2008
- Recorded: 2007
- Genres: Neo-Kraut rock, neo-psychedelic rock
- Labels: Nasoni Records, Anazitisi Records, Stoned Karma Records
- Producer: Vibravoid

Vibravoid chronology
Void Vibration (2002)	The Politics of Ecstasy (2008)	Distortions (2009)

The Politics of Ecstasy is the third studio album by the Düsseldorf-based neo-psychedelic rock and Neo-Kraut Rock band Vibravoid. It was first released in 2008 by Nasoni Records. The first vinyl pressing was released on blue glow in the dark vinyl. The album contains original compositions and cover versions of 1960s songs.

== Background and recording ==
The first demo recordings for the album date from 1996. Doris Delay was written by bandleader Doctor Koch and recorded for the first time with ex-thrash metal band Assassin member Markus Ludwig on bass and vocals. Tracks such as Playing with Beuys and Your Mind Is at Ease were written in the early 2000s, documented by older demo tapes and a live recording released as Vibravoid Live at Duncker Berlin 2002.

Some of the early demo recordings are considered subsequently lost. Doris Delay, the first single from the album, was released in 2004 on Nasoni Records with 100 copies on green glow in the dark vinyl as a limited first edition. This release came several years before the following Vinyl revival, when global record sales were at a low point. The phosphorescent vinyl edition was unusual at the time because of the limited availability of the necessary raw materials. The release was featured in a segment about record collectors on the German television news station program N24 Wissen in 2004.

Further studio recordings were made over a period of 5 years but discarded because of sound quality issues and changes in the band's line-up. Some of this material was later released as bonus tracks on various albums. These difficulties led the band to establish its own recording studio to record and produce the album independently. Recording sessions for the version used in the first official release began in 2007. Guest musician Ufo Walter played bass, while Dario Treese, who later became a permanent member of Vibravoid, played Vox Corinthian organ on Incense and Peppermints. Internal disputes with one band member led to years of legal proceedings and the partial re-recording of the material. A court order required some copies of the first edition to carry an additional sticker. These recordings have not been reissued since.

== Concept and content ==
The album's concept draws on the book The Politics of Ecstasy by Dr. Timothy Leary. The title Doris Delay refers to the character in Tom Wolfe's The Electric Kool-Aid Acid Test. The cover versions of Incense and Peppermints by Strawberry Alarm Clock and Oscillations by Silver Apples also reflect the hippie counterculture of the 1960s.

Vibravoid's version of Incense and Peppermints on YouTube in 2009 was among the earliest video uploads of the song to remain continuously available on the platform. It received more than one million views.

The track Your Mind Is at Ease, which runs for over 20 minutes, contains an extended musique concrète passage incorporating altered quotations from several 1960s counterculture feature films, including Psych-Out. The title Playing with Beuys refers to the artist Joseph Beuys and relates to the Düsseldorf Neo-Kraut Rock approach associated with Vibravoid.

== Releases and editions ==
The album was originally released by the Berlin independent label Nasoni Records in 2008. The LP was pressed in a limited run of 400 copies on black vinyl and 100 on phosphorescent vinyl. The CD contains two additional bonus tracks. A first reissue followed in 2012 on the Greek label Anazitisi Records in six different vinyl colours, with a total pressing of 2,000 copies. This edition included the B-side tracks from the Doris Delay single as bonus tracks. In 2013, German Stoned Karma Records released an expanded double CD accompanied by a DVD. This edition contains 15 audio bonus tracks, including the complete album Phasenvoid, live videos and an alternative video version of Your Mind Is at Ease. A 10th anniversary LP edition on random coloured vinyl was released in 2018 also by Stoned Karma Records. The first 200 copies came with a rotating liquid oil lamp.

== Reception ==
In the British music magazine Shindig!, Rich Deakin described the album as having lysergic qualities and extensive electronic experimentation. He called the band's interpretation of Mother Sky a “space rock masterpiece”.

It's Psychedelic Baby Magazine described the release as a "masterpiece" in a review by Klemen Breznikar.

Greek Jazz & Τζαζ magazine praised the album as a "kraut diamond" and noted that it contains the ethos of Pink Floyd and the tone of Gila and Ash Ra Tempel.

O. Z. Badin for French music magazine New Noise, highlighted the extensive contents of the reissue, the historical bonus material from the Phasenvoid era and the re-recording of Can's Mother Sky, which runs for more than 30 minutes.

Jan Schwarzkamp in the German Visions magazine reviewed the album as an extensive collection of material at the intersection of 1960s psychedelia, fuzz rock and cosmic music. He noted that it encompassed both pop-oriented formats and extended freak-outs.

Spanish music magazine Ruta 66 placed the album's musical style in the historical context of the Düsseldorf music scene and Krautrock. The review also drew comparisons with the music of Florian Fricke.

Claudio Sorge, in the Italian music magazine Rumore, referred to Timothy Leary's motto "Turn On, Tune In, Drop Out" and the freak-out approach of 1960s psychedelic music, identifying these as influences that Vibravoid revisited on the album.

Christoph Höhl reviewed the album in Austrian Slam magazine and noted that the album "enchants the listener from the first second, making a saturation with its hypnotic sounds nearly impossible".

The German music magazine Piranha stated in 2018 that the album had become a classic among enthusiasts.

German music magazine Melodie & Rhythmus praised the cover versions and live tracks as evidence of the band's standing in the European underground scene. The review also noted the sound quality achieved through the use of analogue vintage equipment.

In German music magazine Ox-Fanzine, Claus Wittwer described Vibravoid as "still the most influential German psychedelic band" and called the album "a hammer from start to finish".

The German Coolibri magazine praised the album as a "captivating work of art that leads the listener into the psychedelic soundscapes of the 1960s", highlighting the 20-minute track "Your Mind Is at Ease".

Prinz magazine compared the album's style to "a silver retro-rocket like from an Asimov novel navigating unexplored expanses of space.”

== Track listing ==
1. The Politics of Ecstasy – 4:41
2. Doris Delay – 4:13
3. Incense and Peppermints – 2:30
4. Playing with Beuys – 4:00
5. Oscillations – 2:38
6. Your Mind Is at Ease – 22:31
