= Ronin Publishing =

American book publisher

- Predecessor: And/Or Press
- Founded: 1983
- Founder: Sebastian Orfali and Beverly Potter
- Country of origin: United States
- Headquarters location: Berkeley, California
- Distribution: Publishers Group West
- Publication types: Books
- Nonfiction topics: Personal development, Visionary alternatives, Expanded consciousness
- Imprints: Leary Library; Lilly Library
- Official website: http://www.roninpub.com

Ronin Publishing, Inc. is a small press in Berkeley, California, founded in 1983 and incorporated in 1985, which publishes books as tools for personal development, visionary alternatives, and expanded consciousness. The company's tagline is "Life Skills with Attitude!" In a 1996 Publishers Weekly profile, the company describes itself as a "strong player in the hemp and psychedelia market" that has little competition from major publishers.

Ronin's catalog includes the Leary Library, The Lilly Library, The Fringe Series, The Entheo-Spirituality Series, and various books on psychedelia.

The company has been subpoenaed by the Drug Enforcement Administration to provide names and addresses for people having purchased their books on marijuana horticulture. A number of their books are reprints of out-of-print works from the 1960s and 1970s — including a number of titles published by Ronin's predecessor, And/Or Press — on the psychedelic experience and related subjects.

In 2006, Ronin republished the 1963 Discordian religious text Principia Discordia with altered text, altered images, and a new name, so Ronin could copyright the work. This action offended many fans of the original work, whose authors, Greg Hill (Malaclypse the Younger) and Kerry Thornley, had died several years previously. Malaclypse the Younger, et el purposefully put their book, Principle Discordia into the public domain outside of copyright. Beverly Potter then created a derivative of the work, as she did with eleven Timothy Leary and three John C. Lilly works.

== Titles published ==
=== Timothy Leary Library ===
(original date of publication; Ronin edition)

- Start Your Own Religion (1967; 2004)
- High Priest (1968; 1995)
- The Politics of Ecstasy (1968; 1998)
- Psychedelic Prayers (1972; 1997)
- Chaos & CyberCulture (1994) — Leary's last published work before his death
- Turn On Tune In Drop Out (1999) ISBN 1579510094
- Change Your Brain (2000)
- Politics of Self-Determination (2000)
- Your Brain is God (2001)
- Politics of PsychoPharmacology (2001)
- Musings on Human Metamorphoses (2003) ISBN 1579510582
- Evolutionary Agents (2004)
- The Fugitive Philosopher (2007)

=== Other titles (selected) ===
- Baker, Mary (2016). Citizen Ninja. ISBN 978-1579511913.
- Boire, Richard (2002). Sacred Mushrooms and the Law. Ronin. ISBN 978-1579510619.
- Callenbach, Ernest (1993). Living Cheaply With Style: Live Better and Spend Less. ISBN 0-914171-61-5.
- Conwill, William L. (2016). Training Black Spirit. ISBN 978-1579512224.
- Eisner, Bruce (1994) [1989]. Ecstasy: The MDMA Story (rev. ed.). Ronin. ISBN 0-914171-68-2.
- Estren, Mark James (1993). A History of Underground Comics (4th ed.). ISBN 978-0914171645. — original edition published by Straight Arrow Books
- Estren, Mark James (2012). A History of Underground Comics: 20th Anniversary Edition. ISBN 978-157951156-2.
- Estren, Mark James (2013). Prescription Drug Abuse. Ronin. ISBN 978-1579511685.
- Gaskin, Stephen (1999). Amazing Dope Tales. ISBN 1579510108.
- Krassner, Paul (1981). Tales of Tongue Fu. Ronin. ISBN 1579510809.
- Malaclypse the Younger; Omar Khayyam Ravenhurst (2006). Discordia: Hail the Goddess of Chaos and Confusion. Ronin. ISBN 1-57951-029-9.
- Moraes, Francis (2003). The Little Book of Opium. Ronin. ISBN 0914171836.
- Potter, Beverly A. (1980). Overcoming Job Burnout. ISBN 978-1579510749.
- Potter, Beverly A. (1985). The Way of the Ronin. ISBN 978-1579510510.
- Potter, Beverly A. (1996). The Worrywart's Companion. ISBN 978-1579511753.
- Ruck, Carl A. P. (2011). Sacred Mushrooms & the Goddess. ISBN 978-1579510305.
- Ruck, Carl A. P. (2013). Entheogens, Myth & Human Consciousness. ISBN 978-1579511418.
- Stafford, Peter (2003). Psychedelics. ISBN 0-914171-18-6.
- Todd, Larry (1998) [1974]. Dr. Atomic's Marijuana Multiplier. ISBN 1579510035.
