= High Priest (book) =

1968 book by Timothy Leary

- Cover of the first edition
- Author: Timothy Leary
- Language: English
- Subject: Drug culture
- Publisher: New American Library
- Publication date: 1968
- Publication place: United States
- Media type: Print (hardcover and paperback)
- Pages: 384
- ISBN: 0-914171-80-1

High Priest is a 1968 book by American psychologist and writer Timothy Leary, published by New American Library. Written before Leary's incarceration on drug-related charges, it is an autobiographical account of his experiences from 1959 to 1962, a period that roughly coincides with his employment as a lecturer in clinical psychology at Harvard University.

The book is written in the form of 16 "trips", each involving a "guide", among whom are such influential 1960s figures as Aldous Huxley, Allen Ginsberg, Richard Alpert (Ram Dass), Ralph Metzner, Huston Smith, and William S. Burroughs.

In some of his writing in High Priest, Leary adapts lyrics from the Beatles' 1967 album Sgt. Pepper's Lonely Hearts Club Band, which he considered "an instant drug-culture classic". The book includes Leary's account of his first use of psilocybin mushrooms in Cuernevaca, Mexico in 1960, the Concord Prison Experiment that began in 1961, and the Good Friday Experiment of 1962. It also includes detailed reports of his psychedelic experiences while using psilocybin pills, LSD, and DMT.
