= The Nervous Breakdown (magazine) =

US online magazine

- Website type: Online magazine
- Available in: English
- Creator: Brad Listi
- Editor: Jonathan Evison
- Website: thenervousbreakdown.com
- Launched: 2006; 20 years ago
- Current status: Active

The Nervous Breakdown (TNB) is an online culture magazine and literary community, founded in 2006 by Brad Listi, author of the bestselling novel Attention. Deficit. Disorder. TNB is also an independent publisher of fiction and nonfiction, having launched its own imprint called TNB Books in June 2010. The site also has its own monthly book club called The TNB Book Club.

== The Nervous Breakdown’s Literary Experience ==
The Nervous Breakdown has its own live reading series called TNB's Literary Experience, which takes place in cities all over the United States, including New York, Los Angeles, San Francisco, Denver, Chicago, and Seattle.
