= Brad Listi =

American novelist

Brad Listi is an American author and podcast host. His first novel, Attention. Deficit. Disorder., was published by Simon & Schuster in February 2006, and became a Los Angeles Times Bestseller. His second book, Board, co-authored with Justin Benton, is an experimental nonfiction literary collage published by TNB Books, the publishing imprint of the online culture magazine and literary collective The Nervous Breakdown, of which Listi is the founding editor. TNB (2006-2021) had more than 1,000 contributors and featured authors and a monthly book club, the TNB Book Club. Listi's second novel, 'Be Brief And Tell Them Everything,' was released in 2022 by Ig Publishing.

In 2011, Listi launched the podcast "Otherppl with Brad Listi", which features in-depth interviews with contemporary authors. McSweeney's Internet Tendency included the podcast in its October 2011 McSweeney's Recommends column, calling it "funny, pointed, and thought provoking."

Listi lives in Los Angeles with his wife and two children. He has taught creative writing at Santa Monica College.
