= Vinyl revival =

Renewed interest in gramophone records

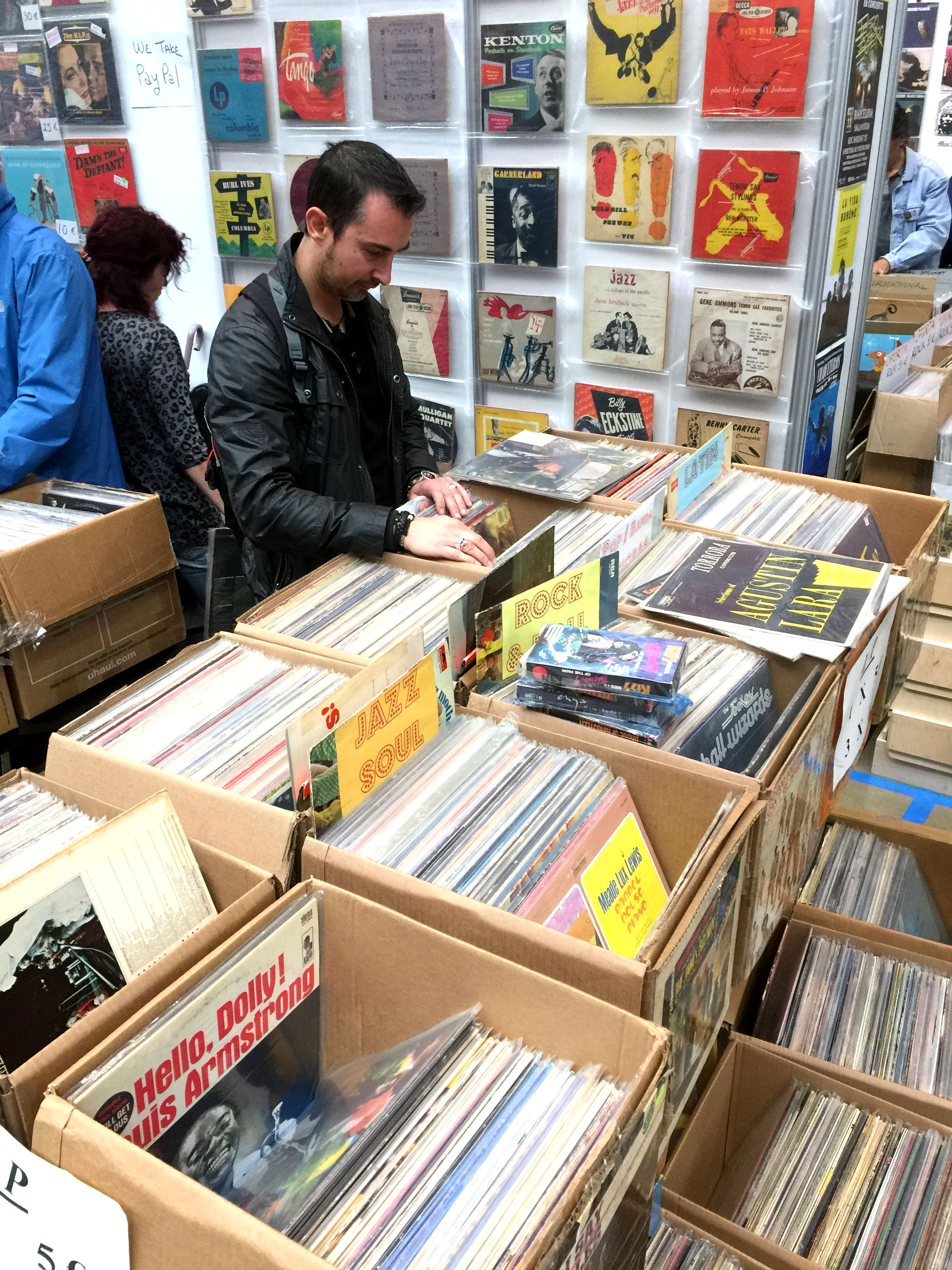
A record store in Barcelona in 2016

The vinyl revival, also known as the vinyl resurgence, is the renewed interest and increased sales of vinyl records, or gramophone records, that has been taking place in the music industry. Beginning in 2007, vinyl records experienced renewed popularity in the West and in East Asia amid steadily increasing sales, renewed interest in the record shop, and the implementation of music charts dedicated solely to vinyl.

The analogue format made of polyvinyl chloride had been the main vehicle for the commercial distribution of pop music from the 1950s until the 1980s when it was largely replaced by the cassette tape and then the compact disc (CD). After the turn of the millennium, CDs were partially replaced by digital downloads and then streaming services. However, in the midst of this, vinyl record sales were increasing and were growing at a quick rate by the early 2010s, eventually reaching levels not seen since the late 1980s in some territories. Despite this, records still make up only a marginal percentage (8% in the US as of 2023) of overall music sales. Alongside these there has also been a swift increase in the sales and manufacturing of new record players/turntables.

The revival peaked in the 2020s, with various publications and record stores crediting Taylor Swift as the main factor. For 2022, the Recording Industry Association of America reported that: "Revenues from vinyl records grew 17% to $1.2 billion – the sixteenth consecutive year of growth – and accounted for 71% of physical format revenues. For the first time since 1987, vinyl albums outsold CDs in units (44 million vs 33 million)." The revival has been relatively muted in certain other countries like Japan and Germany – the world's second and third largest music markets after the U.S. – where CDs continue to outsell records by a significant margin as of 2022.

== History ==
In June 2017, Sony Music announced that by March 2018 it would be producing vinyl records in-house for the first time since ceasing its production in 1989. BBC News reported: "Sony's move comes a few months after it equipped its Tokyo studio with a cutting lathe, used to produce the master discs needed for manufacturing vinyl records." They did, however, note: "Sony is even struggling to find older engineers who know how to make records."

=== In Brazil ===
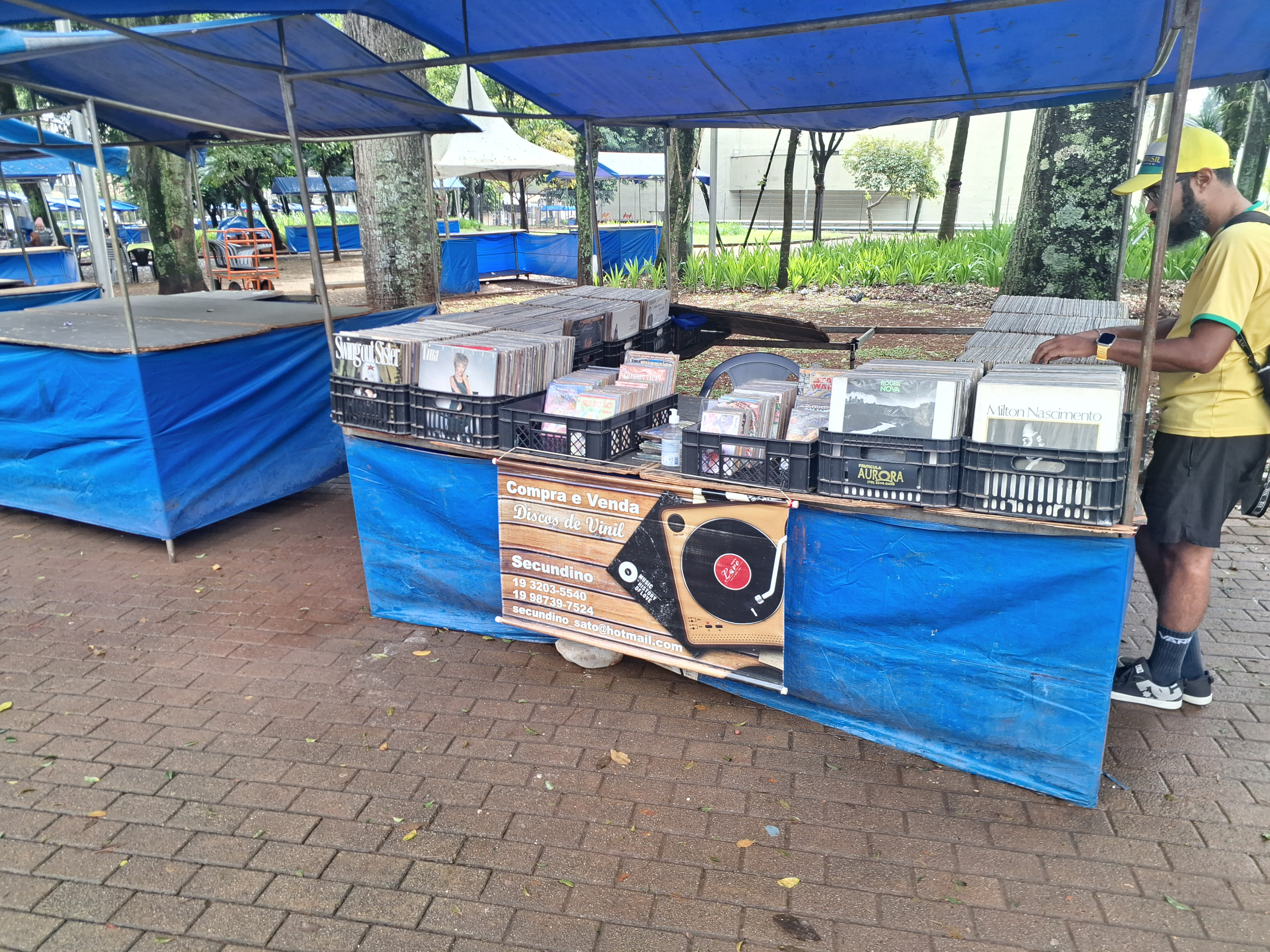
Long play for sale at Praça Imprensa Fluminense, Campinas, São Paulo, 2026

It was reported by Brazilian record companies that in 2023 revenues from vinyl records had shot up by 136%, the highest of any physical formats. Despite physical formats representing a tiny fraction of the Brazilian music industry, the increase in vinyl contributed to physical formats growing to their highest level since 2018.

=== In China ===
In China, which has grown rapidly in recent years to become one of the world's largest music markets, the last vinyl record production plant located in Shanghai stopped in 1998. An experienced audio and video company invested in the creation of a new production plant in Guangzhou in 2015. Since then, the popularity of vinyl records has notably increased, leading to a Chinese equivalent of Record Store Day. Many Chinese had also not experienced the format before due to most of the population living in poverty when vinyl was at its peak in the West.

=== In France ===
Between 2016 and 2021, sales volumes and revenues generated from vinyl records had tripled. In the year 2023, vinyl sales had reached 5.5 million units. Despite it being only half that of CD sales, it matches a similar amount of market revenue due to the higher retail prices of vinyl.

=== In Germany ===
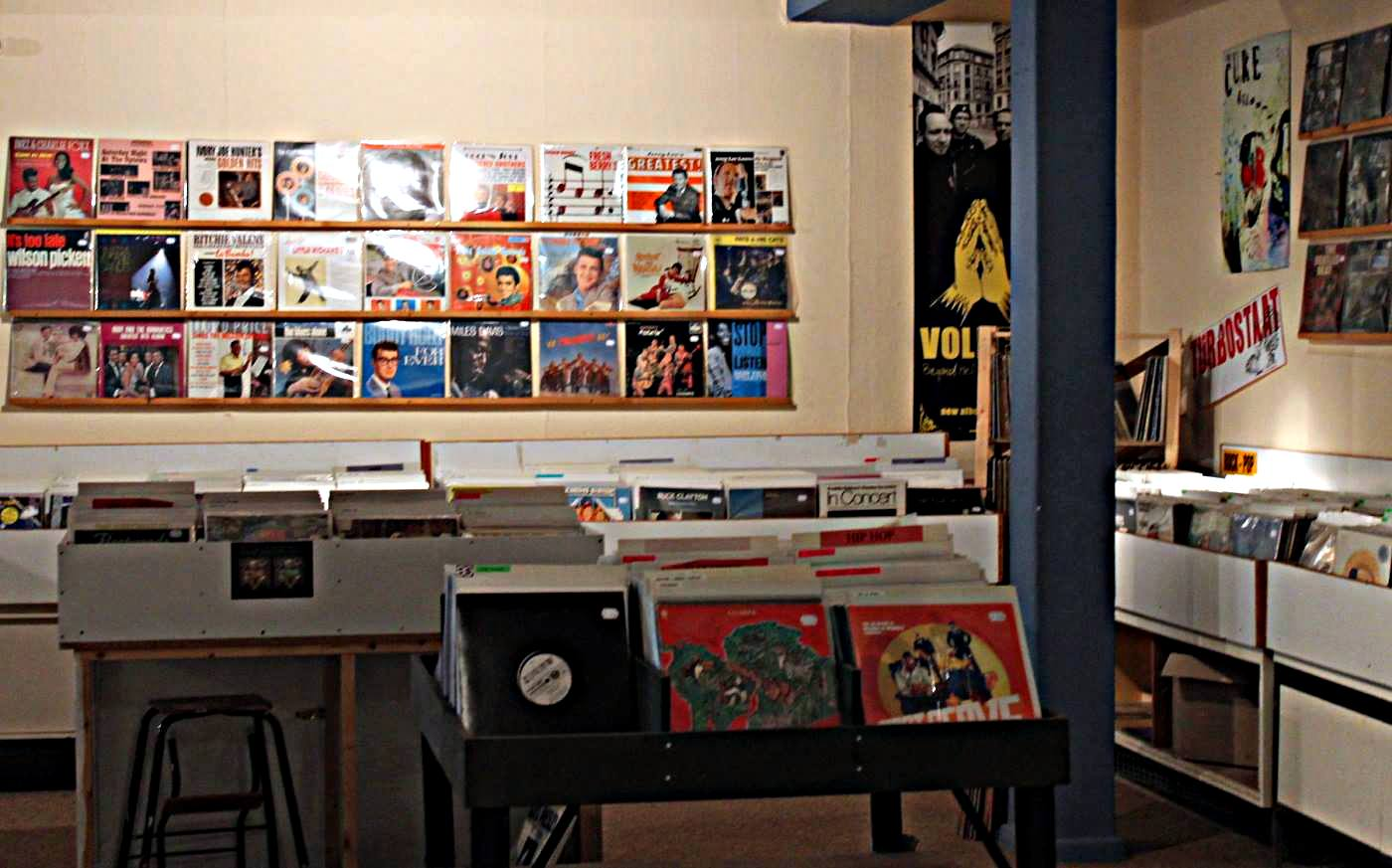
A second-hand record store in Flensburg, Germany (2012)

In Germany a revival of vinyl records already took place in the 1990s in conjunction with the rise of the rave and techno scene. In the mid-1990s, the rave culture had become a mass movement in the country, with raves having tens of thousands of attendees, youth magazines featuring styling tips, and television networks launching music magazines on house and techno music. In this context Der Spiegel in 1998 describes this "renaissance" of the LP format and declares that "LPs are in again". The CD format was regarded as "uncool", while vinyl records could be beatmatched into each other more easily and had more room for album cover art. Record bags were a common fashion accessory at that time. In the early 2000s the mainstream rave movement declined, and by the end of the decade a majority of the so-called "techno record stores" and record store chains that had emerged in the 1990s had disappeared again.

Outside of the electronic scene, the Düsseldorf-based neo-psychedelic band Vibravoid emerged as a persistent proponent of the format. Having released their music almost exclusively on vinyl since their formation in the 1990s, the band is often credited with keeping the collector culture alive through the format's commercial low point with elaborate op-art packaging and multi-colored editions.

Around 2007 another revival of vinyl began, this time also concerning the collection of other genres such as pop music, and increasingly promoted by the music industry.

In 2016, Germany had 476 record stores, with 3.1 million vinyl records being sold. In 2020, sales of vinyl LPs in Germany increased to 4.2 million units sold. Almost three quarters of the 20 most popular records of this year belong to the rock music genre.

=== In Japan ===
Sales of music CDs in Japan began in 1982. By 1986, the compact disc began replacing the gramophone record as the primary means of music distribution in Japan. As opposed to declining CD sales in Western markets, CDs remained a huge market in Japan, with sales of over 100 million each year from 1998 until 2018. Beginning in the early 2000s decade, nostalgia for vinyl records was growing, although CD sales were still strong. Inspired by the Record Store Day event in the United States, Japanese record stores began promoting the revival of gramophone records in 2012. Concurrently, popular musicians including Sakanaction, AKB48, Perfume, and Masaharu Fukuyama began releasing their music for vinyl distribution. In 2014, HMV Record Shop, a proponent in selling vinyl records, opened in Shibuya. Technology brands such as Sony Electronics and Panasonic released revived models of gramophone record players, starting in 2016.

From the mid-2010s decade, vinyl records have enjoyed renewed popularity, with specialized shops opening in Shibuya, Shinjuku, and Ginza. From 2010 to 2020, vinyl sales in Japan increased tenfold, from 105,000 copies to 1,219,000 copies. Although the 2020 figure did not match that of 2000 (when nearly two million vinyl records were sold), it was the best figure since 2004. Popular artists such as Perfume and Back Number have led the way for vinyl revival, and CD sales have declined by 35% from 2008 to 2018.

=== In the United Kingdom ===
Similarly in the United Kingdom, the compact disc surpassed the gramophone record in popularity in the late 1980s. This started a gradual decline in vinyl record sales throughout the 1990s. The popularity of indie rock caused sales of new vinyl records (particularly 7 inch singles) to increase significantly in 2006. Sales of vinyl LP records in the UK increased every year between 2007 and 2014. In December 2011, BBC Radio 6 Music began an occasional Vinyl Revival series in which Peter Paphides met musicians who revealed, and played selections from, their vinyl record collections.

In November 2014, it was reported that over one million vinyl records had been sold in the UK since the beginning of the year. Sales had not reached this level since 1996. The British Phonographic Industry (BPI) predicted that Christmas sales would bring the total for the year to around 1.2 million. However, vinyl sales were still a very small proportion of total music sales. Pink Floyd's The Endless River became the fastest-selling UK vinyl release of 2014 – and the fastest-selling since 1997 – despite selling only 6,000 copies.

In 2016, 3.2 million vinyl records were sold in the UK, the best sale for a quarter of a century. The vinyl revival was among the factors credited with ensuring the survival of physical music retailer HMV following its 2013 collapse into administration, with vinyl sales in 2014 up 170% on the year before and the vinyl offering further strengthened since 2019 under subsequent owner Doug Putman.

As of 2016, the revival continued, with UK vinyl sales exceeding streaming audio revenue for the year.

In January 2017, the BPI's 'Official UK recorded music market report for 2016', using Official Charts Company data, noted: "Though still niche in terms of its size within the overall recorded music market, vinyl enjoyed another stellar year, with over 3.2 million LPs sold – a 53 per cent rise on last year." The BPI also reported: "The biggest-selling vinyl artist was David Bowie, with 5 albums posthumously featuring in the top-30 best-sellers, including his Mercury Prize shortlisted Blackstar, which was 2016's most popular vinyl recording ahead of Amy Winehouse's Back to Black, selling more than double the number of copies of 2015's best seller on vinyl – Adele's 25."

BBC Radio 4's Front Row discussed the increase in coloured vinyl releases in October 2017 in the wake of recent albums in the format by Beck, Liam Gallagher, and St. Vincent. According to the BPI, more than five million vinyl records were sold in 2021 in the UK, an increase of 8% over 2020 and the 14th consecutive increase since 2007. The BPI estimated that almost one in four album purchases that year were on vinyl, the highest proportion since 1990.

In March 2023, the BPI published an analysis of Official Charts data, and claimed that vinyl purchases have increased for a 16th consecutive year in the UK. The vinyl market in 2023 has experienced an 11.7% year-on-year rise to 5.9 million units, up from a 2.9% increase the previous year.

In 2024, BBC reported that, for the first time since 1992, vinyl records have been included in the set of goods used by the UK's Office for National Statistics (ONS) to track prices and calculate the rate of inflation.

=== In the United States ===
In the 1980s, vinyl records declined in popularity. The major label distributors restricted their return policies, which retailers had been relying on to maintain and swap out stocks of relatively unpopular titles.

First, the distributors began charging retailers more for new product if they returned unsold vinyl, and then they stopped providing any credit at all for returns. Retailers, fearing they would be stuck with anything they ordered, only ordered proven, popular titles that they knew would sell, and devoted more shelf space to CDs and cassettes. Record companies also deleted many vinyl titles from production and distribution, further undermining the availability of the format and leading to the closure of pressing plants. This rapid decline in the availability of records accelerated the format's decline in popularity, and is seen by some as a deliberate ploy to make consumers switch to CDs, which were more profitable for the record companies. Between 2003 and 2008, over 3,000 record stores in the country closed their doors. But ever since 2007, the popularity of vinyl records has risen again with annual sales increasing by 85.8% between 2006 and 2007 in the United States, although starting from a low base, and by 89% between 2007 and 2008. In 2009, 3.5 million units sold in the United States, including 3.2 million albums, the highest number since 1998. The largest online retailer of vinyl records in 2014 was Amazon with a 12.3% market share, while the largest physical retailer of vinyl records was Urban Outfitters with an 8.1% market share.

US vinyl sales in units, 1995–2020

In its 'Shipment and Revenue Statistics' report for 2016, the Recording Industry Association of America noted that "Shipments of vinyl albums were up 4% to $430 million, and comprised 26% of total physical shipments at retail value – their highest share since 1985". In 2019, Rolling Stone said that "Vinyl records earned $224.1 million (on 8.6 million units) in the first half of 2019, closing in on the $247.9 million (on 18.6 million units) generated by CD sales. Vinyl revenue grew by 12.8% in the second half of 2018 and 12.9% in the first six months of 2019, while the revenue from CDs barely budged. If these trends hold, records will soon be generating more money than compact discs". Best Buy discontinued CDs in 2019, but as of January 2020 still sells vinyl. Target Corporation and Walmart still sell CDs, but use less shelf space for them and use more space for vinyl records, players, and accessories.

By 2019, vinyl sales continued healthy growth at the expense of other physical media and despite the growing prominence of streaming, presently the cheapest (legal) way to listen to music. In the first half of 2020, vinyl recordings outsold CDs (in terms of revenue) in the US for the first time since the 1980s. In 2020 vinyl recordings accounted only for 5.1% ($619.6m) of total US music revenues and CDs accounted for 4% ($483.3m) of revenues. Digital and streaming formats accounted for the remainder of the $12.2 billion in US music revenues, with paid subscriptions accounting for 57.7% of total revenue at $7.0 billion. Americans across age groups have been contributing to the preservation and revival of vinyl records. According to a 2019 YouGov poll, 31% of the U.S. population is willing to pay for music on vinyl, including 36% of Baby boomers, 33% of Generation X, 28% of Millennials, and 26% of Generation Z.

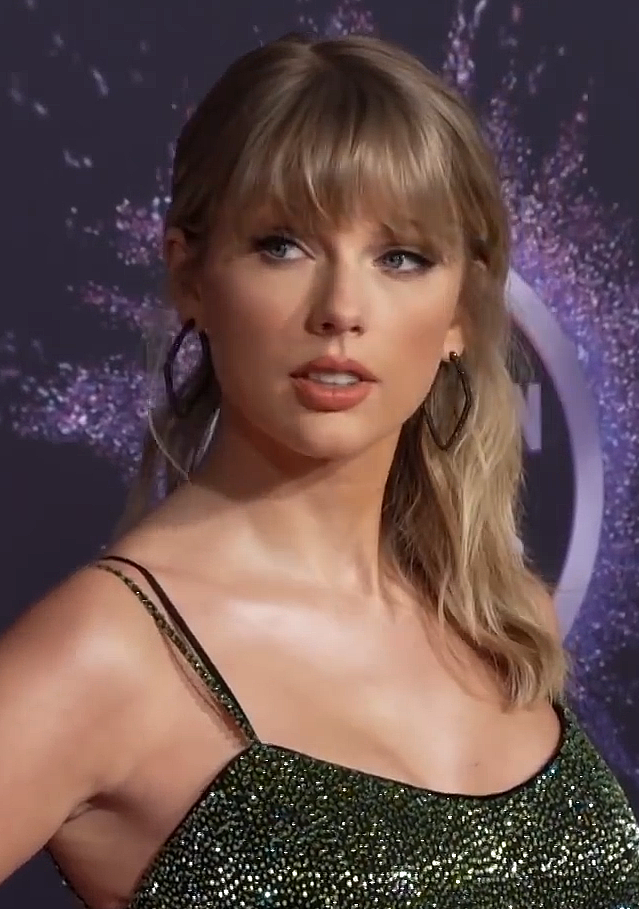
Taylor Swift leads the 21st-century vinyl revival in the Anglosphere.

Taylor Swift had a large impact on the vinyl revival. Her ninth studio album, Evermore (2020), sold 102,000 vinyl LPs in a single week in June 2021, breaking the record for the biggest vinyl sales week for an album since MRC Data began tracking sales in 1991. In 2021, for the first time in the last 30 years, vinyl record sales exceeded CD sales; one of every 3 albums sold in the US was a vinyl LP. Indie retailers sold almost half of all vinyl LPs, while Swift was the format's top-selling artist, accounting for 2.6% of total sales. As per the MRC Data mid-year report for 2021, sales of vinyl records in the US surpassed that of the CDs; 19.2 million vinyl albums were sold in the first six months of 2021, outpacing the 18.9 million CDs sold. This has been attributed to a phenomenon of listeners looking for tangible ways to consume music, especially the fanbases of various musicians. In 2022, Swift's tenth studio album, Midnights sold 575,000 LPs in its first week, totaling 945,000 LPs in the last two months of the year, garnering the largest vinyl sales year for an album in Luminate Data history. Swift sold 1.695 million vinyl LPs across her entire catalog in 2022, with one of every 25 vinyl LPs sold that year in the U.S. being a Swift album—a sum larger than the next two biggest-sellers of vinyl combined: Harry Styles with 719,000 and the Beatles with 553,000.

In 2023, Swift released her rerecording of her 5th studio album, 1989 (Taylor's Version). The album sold 580,000 vinyl the first week of release, Luminate’s biggest vinyl sales week since they began tracking sales in 1991. She was responsible for 1 out of 15 vinyls sold, about 7% of all vinyl sold that year. In March 2023, the RIAA published a revenue report for 2022, in which vinyl accounted for $1.2 billion of physical media sales out of a total of $1.7 billion. This was the first instance of vinyl sales growth outpacing CD sales growth since 1987 as CDs saw an 18% decline in sales year-on-year. Americans bought 49.61 million vinyl records in 2023, which was a 14% increase from the previous years sales. Swift's 2024 album, The Tortured Poets Department sold 859,000 LPs in the album's first week alone, beating the previous set record by herself. The album ended up becoming the best selling album of the year with 1.489 million copies sold. Swift's 2025 album, The Life of a Showgirl, sold 1.334 million LPs during its first week of release, already making it the best selling album of the year. This contributed to the net vinyl industry incomes surpassing the $1 billion mark for the first time since 1983. Vinyl sales climbed 7.9%, to 46.8 million from 43.4 million in 2024, with revenue climbing to $1 billion from $954 million.

== Reasons ==
Records are perceived as more durable, come in significantly larger packaging (allowing more detail in the album art to be visible), and may include bonus items absent from a CD copy of the same album (for example, a poster or clothing article, or exclusive liner notes). These factors can cause a CD to be seen as a poor value even if an LP is more expensive.

CDs are capable of more accurate sound reproduction and are effectively free of noise and sound artifacts, but many listeners find records' imperfections more subjectively pleasant than digital audio. The rise in vinyl demand also correlates with the rise in popularity of streaming services throughout the 2010s, with many listeners choosing to purchase a beloved album on vinyl after discovering it on Spotify or Apple Music. Records are also tactile, physical, collectable items that offer a drastically different listening experience than the ubiquitous streaming services.

In spite of many record sales being modern artists or genres, records may be considered a part of retro style, benefiting from a general cultural interest in the technology and media of the past.

According to Adriaan Neervoort, owner of Wanted Music, in Beckenham, Kent, "Vinyl has a more engaging human sound, it comes beautifully packaged. People want to know more about music and they want to engage with it more."

Another factor of the increased sales of vinyl are that many albums today have multiple physical variants. Vinyl variants range from different colors of the record, alternative album covers, and even bonus tracks not released on streaming. All these drive the desire to collect multiple, if not all, variants. Vinyl variants have always been a practice but have recently become a larger trend within the community. As of mid-2024, the top 10 albums on the Billboard 200 had an average of 7 variants per album. Luminate reports that in 2019, the top 10 albums had an average of 3.3 physical album variants; that number has increased to 8.9 physical versions in 2023. Dua Lipa's 2024 album Radical Optimism had 20 variants. Charli XCX's 2024 album Brat had 20 as well. Meanwhile, Travis Scott's 2023 album Utopia had 31 physical variants.

Holidays like Record Store Day and Singles' Day have also contributed to the vinyl revival. Singles' Day was originally an unofficial Chinese holiday used to celebrate being single, but has recently become an excuse to sell exclusive vinyl singles from multiple big artists. It is celebrated 11/11 to symbolize 1 as a single. Urban Outfitters began celebrating the day in 2020 by releasing 11 7-inch vinyl singles, but the holiday has grown more every year as more record companies and artists are hopping on the trend.

== Sales ==
NOTE: Many citations below include CD sales, not just vinyl sales. This chart should be reviewed and revised for accuracy.

Countries	2007		2008		2009		2010		2011		2012		2013		2014		2015		2016		2017		2018		2019	
Global Trade Value $US (SP&LP)	$55m		$66m		$73m		$89m		$116m		$171m		–		–		$416m		–		–		–		–	
Australia (SP/LP)	10,000	17,996	10,000	19,608	10,000	53,766	13,677	39,644	13,637	44,876	21,623	77,934	10,069	137,658	277,767		374,097		655,301		786,735		–		–	
Germany (SP&LP)	400,000		700,000		1,200,000		635,000 (LPs only)		700,000 (LPs only)		1,000,000		1,400,000		1,800,000		2,100,000		3,100,000		–		–		–	
Finland (SP&LP)	10,301		13,688		15,747		27,515		54,970		47,811		72,480		82,313		–		–		–		–		–	
Hungary (LP)	2,974		2,923		3,763		1,879		8,873		9,819		14,719		24,132		–		–		–		–		–	
Japan (SP&LP)	324,000		212,000		102,000		105,000		210,000		453,000		268,000		401,000		662,000		799,000		1,063,000		1,116,000		1,219,000	
Netherlands (LP)	–		–		51,000		60,400		81,000		115,000		–		300,000±		650,000+		1,000,000+		–		–		–	
Spain (LP)	–		40,000		106,000		97,000		141,000		135,000		–		–		–		–		–		–		–	
Sweden (SP&LP)	11,000		22,000		36,000		70,671		101,484		168,543		200,008		–		–		–		–		–		–	
United Kingdom (SP/LP)	1,843,000	205,000	740,000	209,000	332,000	219,000	219,000	234,000	186,000	337,000	–	389,000	–	780,000	–	–	–	–	–	-	-	3.2 million	–	4.2 million	-	-
United States (LP)	988,000		1,880,000		2,500,000		2,800,000		3,800,000		4,600,000		6,100,000		9,200,000		11,900,000		13,000,000		14,320,000		16,800,000			
Australian single figures for 2007, 2008 and 2009 are estimated.; In reality German figures are considered to be "a lot higher" due to smaller shops and online communities in Germany not using scanner cash registers. One German record pressing company stated that they alone produce 2 million LPs each year.; In reality American figures are considered to be much higher, with one record store owner, in a New York Times article, estimating that Nielson SoundScan only tracks "about 15 percent" of total sales due to bar codes, concluding that sales could now be as high as 20 million.; In New Zealand, independent record stores in Auckland were reporting a five-fold increase in vinyl sales from 2007 to 2011.; In France, the SNEP said that LP sales were 200,000 in 2008, however independent record labels said that overall sales were probably 1 million.; In the United States, 67% of all vinyl album sales in 2012 were sold at independent music stores.; Vinyl revenues were at the lowest point in its history in 2006, with a total trade value of $36 million. The 2011 figure of $116 million, is higher than the 2000 figure of $109 million, but is still less than the 1997, 1998 and 1999 figures which were all between $150–$170 million.

=== Annual bestselling LPs in the United States ===
Year	Album	Artist	Sales
2008	In Rainbows	Radiohead	25,800
2009	Abbey Road	The Beatles	34,800
2010	Abbey Road	The Beatles	35,000
2011	Abbey Road	The Beatles	41,000
2012	Blunderbuss	Jack White	34,000
2013	Random Access Memories	Daft Punk	49,000
2014	Lazaretto	Jack White	87,000
2015	25	Adele	116,000
2016	Blackstar	David Bowie	54,000
2017	Sgt. Pepper's Lonely Hearts Club Band	The Beatles	72,000
2018	Guardians of the Galaxy: Awesome Mix Vol. 1	Various Artists	84,000
2019	Abbey Road	The Beatles	246,000
2020	Fine Line	Harry Styles	232,000
2021	30	Adele	318,000
2022	Midnights	Taylor Swift	945,000
2023	1989 (Taylor's Version)	Taylor Swift	1,014,000
2024	The Tortured Poets Department	Taylor Swift	1,489,000
2025	The Life of a Showgirl	Taylor Swift	1,601,000

=== Total sales in the United States ===
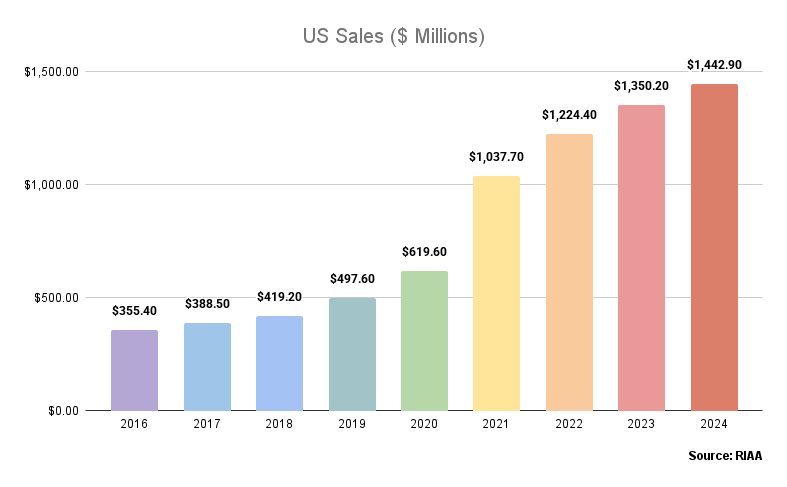
US total vinyl sales (millions $)

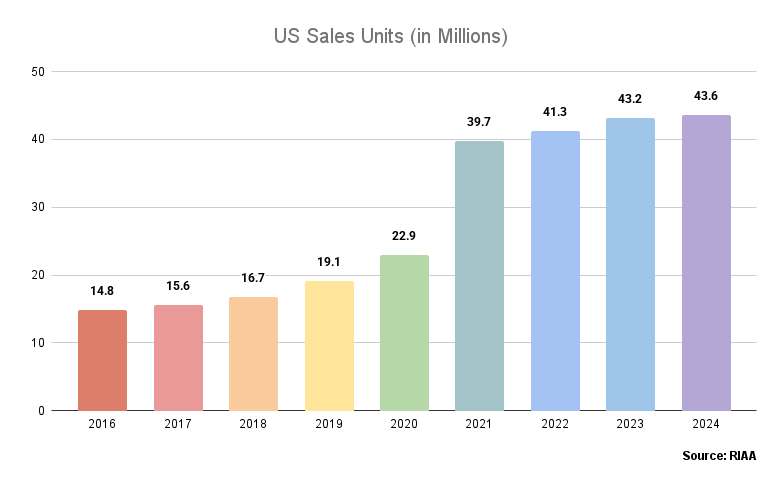
Total US vinyl units sold (millions)

== Record Store Day ==
Most customers prefer to buy vinyl from small, independent record stores with a larger selection than department stores. Record Store Day is an internationally celebrated day observed the third Saturday of April each year. Its purpose, as conceived by independent record store employee Chris Brown, is to celebrate the art of music. The day brings together fans, artists, and thousands of independent record stores across the world.

Record Store Day was officially founded in 2007 and is celebrated globally with hundreds of recording and other artists participating in the day by making special appearances, performances, meet and greets with their fans, the holding of art exhibits, and the issuing of special vinyl and CD releases along with other promotional products to mark the occasion.

In 2013, for the week of Record Store Day in the United Kingdom, 68,936 records were sold (an 86.5% rise from 36,957 in 2012). This can be broken down into 1,249 7" albums, 25,100 12" albums, 27,042 7" singles and 15,545 12" singles. From 29 December 2017 to 28 June 2018 there was a 19.2% increase in vinyl sales compared to the same period the previous year. Vinyl sales hold over 18% of physical record sales in the United States, a 7% increase from previous years.

== UK Official Record Store Chart ==
The Official Record Store Chart is a weekly music chart based on physical sales of albums in almost 100 independent record stores in the United Kingdom. It is compiled by the Official Charts Company (OCC), and each week's number one is first announced on Sunday evenings on the OCC's official website.

The chart's launch was first announced by the OCC on 17 April 2012 – at the time, British record stores were selling 4.5 million albums per year, and were contributing towards 95 per cent of the country's total vinyl sales.

== Nomenclature debate ==
Arising within the renewed popularity of vinyl records, there is a small debate over the issue of how they should properly be referred to in English. While many refer to them as "records" or "LPs", sometimes they are referred to as "vinyl", an informal term derived from its material composition. The disagreement arises over how the word "vinyl" is used. Those who remember the vinyl records' original popularity in the 1980s and before, use the term "vinyl" in context such as "I have that album on vinyl", and also when using it as a mass noun, e.g. "I have a huge collection of vinyl". Those whose experience with records is only during the more recent revival, have developed a different way of using the word, referring to vinyl records in the plural as "vinyls", as well as using the indefinite article "a", such as saying "I need to go buy a vinyl". Arguments are made based on the rules of language, and whether "vinyls" could be a proper way of referring to records in the plural. On the "vinyls" side, a key argument is whether vinyl is a "mass noun": "These nouns — such as cheese, beer and wine — refer to stuff that comes in variable but conceptually undifferentiated quantities that are measured rather than counted."

== See also ==
- Analog revival
- Album era
- Conservation and restoration of vinyl discs
- CX (noise reduction)
- UC (noise reduction)
