= Entheogen =

Psychoactive substance that induces spiritual experiences

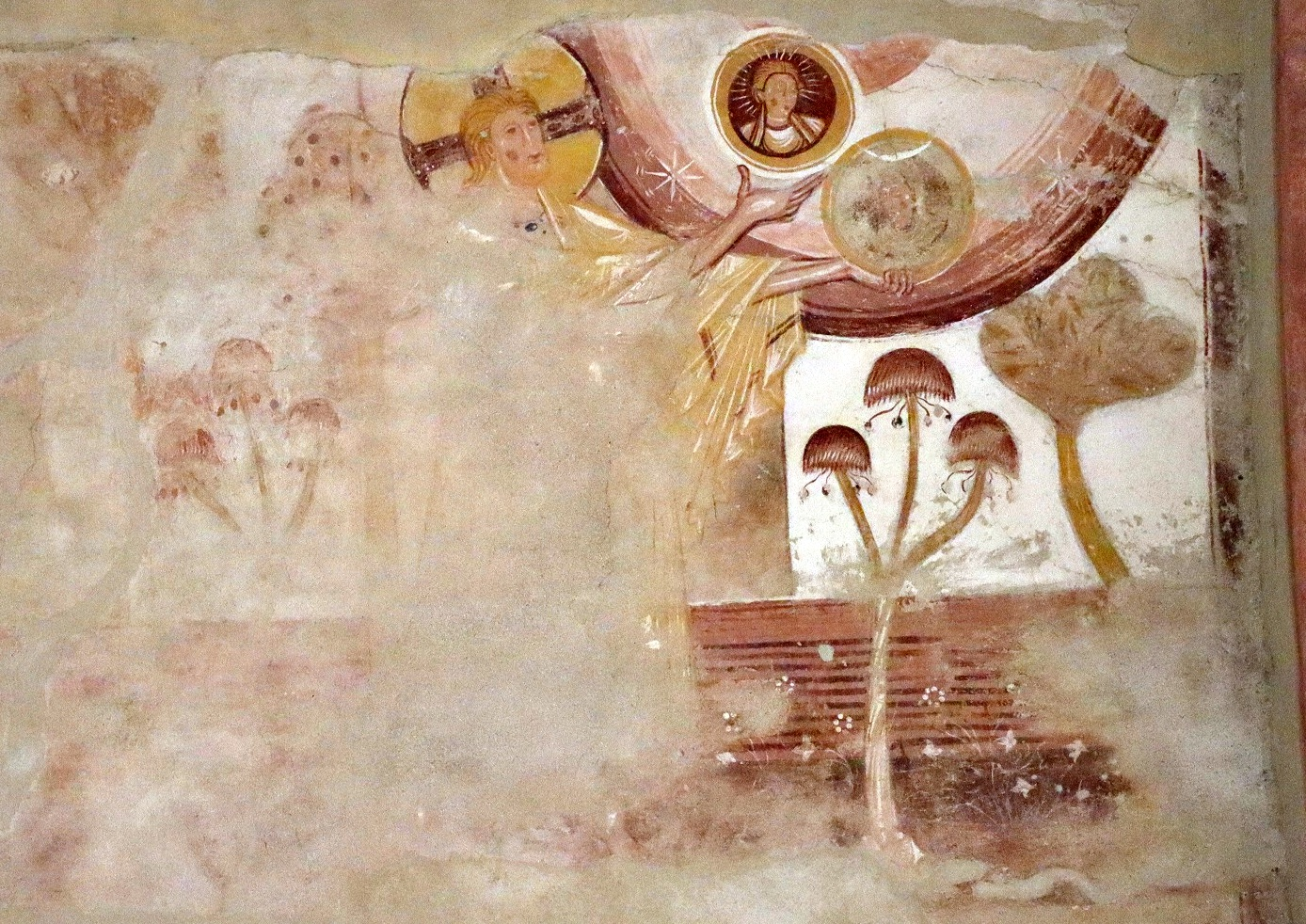
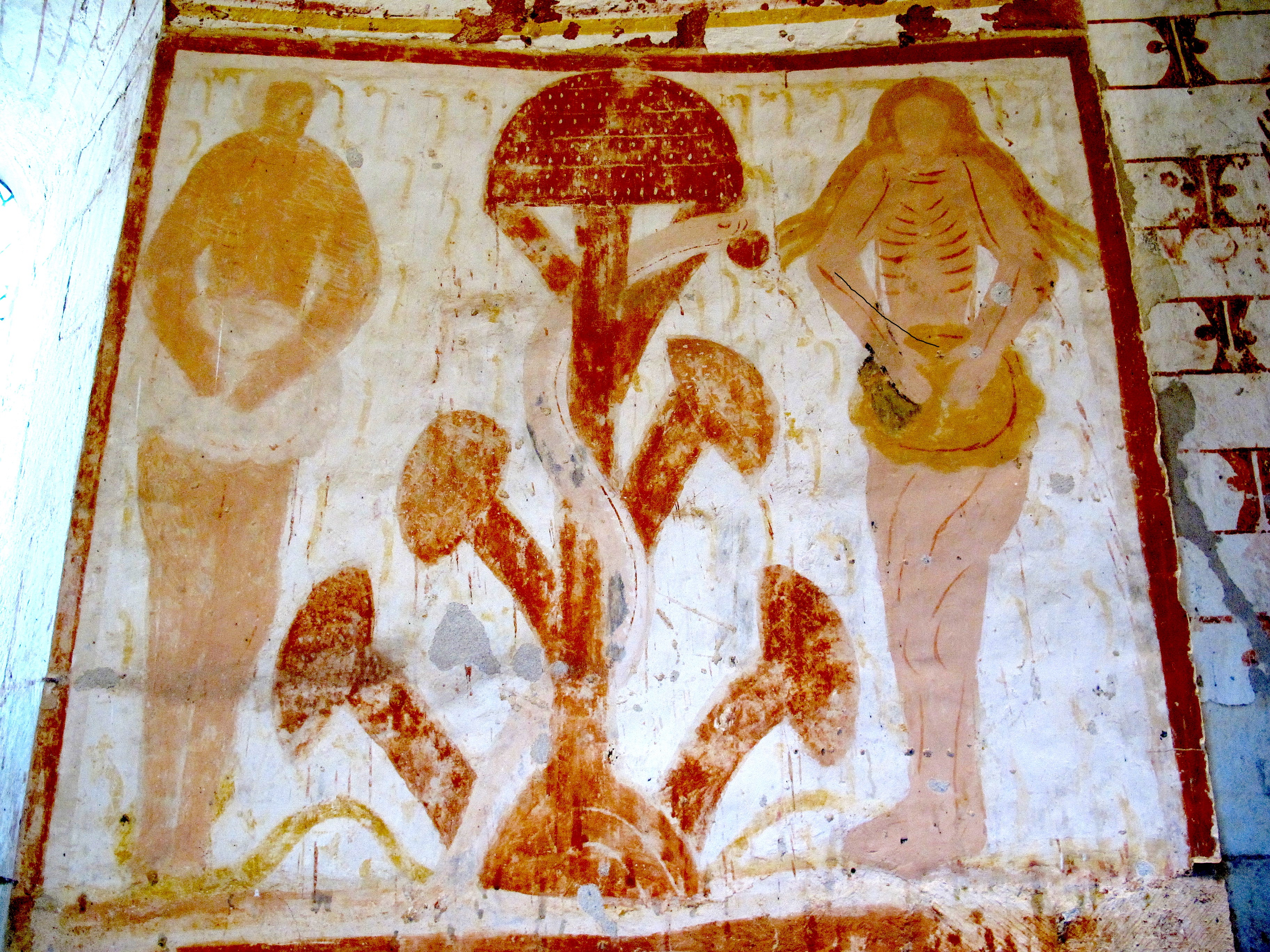
12th-century frescoes depicting alleged entheogenic mushrooms in Christian art

Entheogens are psychoactive substances used in spiritual, religious, recreational, therapeutic, and experimental contexts to induce altered states of consciousness. While the term itself emphasizes ritual and sacred applications, the same substances are also frequently employed recreationally—sometimes in ways that diverge from or disregard traditional protocols. Hallucinogens such as the psilocybin found in so-called "magic" mushrooms have been used in sacred contexts since ancient times. Derived from a term meaning "generating the divine from within", entheogens are, in religious and shamanic contexts, intentionally employed in the attempt to facilitate experiences of transcendence, healing, divination, and mystical insight.

Entheogens have been used in religious rituals in the belief they aid personal spiritual development. Anthropological study has established that entheogens are used for religious, magical, shamanic, or spiritual purposes in many parts of the world. Civilizations such as the Maya and Aztecs used Psilocybe mushrooms, peyote buttons, and morning glory seeds in ceremonies meant to connect with deities and perform healing. They have traditionally been used to supplement diverse practices, such as transcendence, including healing, divination, meditation, yoga, sensory deprivation, asceticism, prayer, trance, rituals, chanting, imitation of sounds, hymns like peyote songs, drumming, and ecstatic dance.

In ancient Eurasian and Mediterranean societies, scholars hypothesized the sacramental use of entheogens in mystery religions, such as the Eleusinian Mysteries of ancient Greece. According to The Road to Eleusis, psychoactive kykeon brews may have been central to these rites, aimed at inducing visionary states and mystical insight. These interpretations emphasize entheogens as central to religious practices in antiquity.

In recent decades, entheogens have experienced a resurgence in academic and clinical research, particularly in psychiatry and psychotherapy. Preliminary clinical research indicates that substances such as psilocybin and MDMA may be useful in treating mental health conditions like depression, post-traumatic stress disorder, and anxiety, especially in end-of-life care. These developments reflect a broader reevaluation of entheogens not only as sacred tools but also as potentially transformative therapeutic agents.

The psychedelic experience is often compared to non-ordinary forms of consciousness such as those experienced in meditation, near-death experiences, and mystical experiences. Ego dissolution is often described as a key feature of the psychedelic state often resulting in perceived personal insight spiritual awakening, or a reorientation of values. Though evidence is often fragmentary, ongoing research in fields like archaeology, anthropology, psychology, and religious studies continues to shed light on the widespread historical and contemporary role of entheogens in human culture.

== Terminology and etymology ==
The term entheogen, largely attributable to Jonathan Ott, R. Gordon Wasson, and Carl A.P. Ruck, was coined in the late 20^{th} century as a more neutral and respectful alternative to terms like 'hallucinogen' or 'psychedelic'. The word is derived from the Greek words ἐν (en, "within"), θεός (theos, "god"), and γεννάω (gennao, "to generate"), meaning "generating the divine within." This term emphasizes the spiritual and religious contexts in which these substances have traditionally been used, distinguishing them from purely recreational or pharmacological classifications. The Greeks used it as praise for poets and other artists. Genesthai means "to come into being". Together, the term entheogen refers to a substance that "generates the divine within," typically producing feelings of inspiration, religious ecstasy, or spiritual insight.

The term hallucinogen was deemed inappropriate owing to its etymological relationship to words relating to delirium and insanity. The term psychedelic was also seen as problematic, owing to the similarity in sound to words about psychosis and also because it had become irreversibly associated with various connotations of the 1960s pop culture. In modern usage, entheogen may be used synonymously with these terms, or it may be chosen to contrast with recreational use of the same drugs. The meanings of the term entheogen was formally defined:

In a strict sense, only those vision-producing drugs that can be shown to have figured in shamanic or religious rites would be designated entheogens, but in a looser sense, the term could also be applied to other drugs, both natural and artificial, that induce alterations of consciousness similar to those documented for ritual ingestion of traditional entheogens.

— Ruck et al., 1979, Journal of Psychedelic Drugs

In 2004, David E. Nichols wrote the following:

Many different names have been proposed over the years for this drug class. The famous German toxicologist Louis Lewin used the name phantastica earlier in this century, and as we shall see later, such a descriptor is not so farfetched. The most popular names – hallucinogen, psychotomimetic, and psychedelic ("mind manifesting") – have often been used interchangeably. Hallucinogen is now, however, the most common designation in the scientific literature, although it is an inaccurate descriptor of the actual effects of these drugs. In the lay press, the term psychedelic is still the most popular and has held sway for nearly four decades. Most recently, there has been a movement in nonscientific circles to recognize the ability of these substances to provoke mystical experiences and evoke feelings of spiritual significance. Thus, the term entheogen, derived from the Greek word entheos, which means "god within," was introduced by Ruck et al. and has seen increasing use. This term suggests that these substances reveal or allow a connection to the "divine within." Although it seems unlikely that this name will ever be accepted in formal scientific circles, its use has dramatically increased in popular media and internet sites. Indeed, in much of the counterculture that uses these substances, entheogen has replaced psychedelic as the name of choice, and we may expect to see this trend continue.

== Historical and cultural use ==
Entheogens have been used in various cultures worldwide, primarily in religious or healing ceremonies. R. Gordon Wasson and Giorgio Samorini have proposed several examples of the cultural use of entheogens that are found in the archaeological record. Hemp seeds discovered by archaeologists at Pazyryk suggest early ceremonial practices by the Scythians occurred during the 5th to 2nd century BCE, confirming previous historical reports by Herodotus. As detailed in Ott's Pharmacotheon (1993/1996), substances such as ayahuasca in South America, psilocybin mushrooms in Mesoamerica, and peyote in North America have long-standing traditional uses for spiritual communication, healing, and ritual.

These traditional uses often involve carefully controlled ceremonial contexts that emphasize the sacred and transformative nature of the entheogenic experience. For example, the Native American Church incorporates peyote in its religious ceremonies, while indigenous Amazonian cultures use ayahuasca in shamanic rituals.

Most of the well-known modern examples of entheogens, such as Ayahuasca, peyote, psilocybin mushrooms, and morning glories are from the native cultures of the Americas. However, it has also been suggested that entheogens played an important role in ancient Indo-European culture, for example by inclusion in the ritual preparations of the Soma, the "pressed juice" that is the subject of Book 9 of the Rigveda. Soma was ritually prepared and drunk by priests and initiates and elicited a paean in the Rigveda that embodies the nature of an entheogen:

Splendid by Law! declaring Law, truth speaking, truthful in thy works, Enouncing faith, King Soma!... O [Soma] Pavāmana (mind clarifying), place me in that deathless, undecaying world wherein the light of heaven is set, and everlasting lustre shines.... Make me immortal in that realm where happiness and transports, where joy and felicities combine...

The kykeon that preceded initiation into the Eleusinian Mysteries is another entheogen, which was investigated (before the word was coined) by Carl Kerényi, in Eleusis: Archetypal Image of Mother and Daughter. Other entheogens in the Ancient Near East and the Aegean include the opium poppy, datura, and the unidentified "lotus" (likely the sacred blue lily) eaten by the Lotus-Eaters in the Odyssey and Narcissus.

According to Ruck, Eyan, and Staples, the familiar shamanic entheogen that the Indo-Europeans brought knowledge of was Amanita muscaria. It could not be cultivated; thus it had to be found, which suited it to a nomadic lifestyle. When they reached the world of the Caucasus and the Aegean, the Indo-Europeans encountered wine, the entheogen of Dionysus, who brought it with him from his birthplace in the mythical Nysa, when he returned to claim his Olympian birthright. The Indo-European proto-Greeks "recognized it as the entheogen of Zeus, and their own traditions of shamanism, the Amanita and the 'pressed juice' of Soma – but better, since no longer unpredictable and wild, the way it was found among the Hyperboreans: as befit their own assimilation of agrarian modes of life, the entheogen was now cultivable." Robert Graves, in his foreword to The Greek Myths, hypothesises that the ambrosia of various pre-Hellenic tribes was Amanita muscaria (which, based on the morphological similarity of the words amanita, amrita and ambrosia, is entirely plausible) and perhaps psilocybin mushrooms of the genus Panaeolus. Amanita muscaria was regarded as divine food, according to Ruck and Staples, not something to be indulged in, sampled lightly, or profaned. It was seen as the food of the gods, their ambrosia, and as mediating between the two realms. It is said that Tantalus's crime was inviting commoners to share his ambrosia.

== By region ==
=== Africa ===
The best-known entheogen-using culture of Africa is the Bwitists, who used a preparation of the root bark of Tabernanthe iboga. Although the ancient Egyptians may have been using the sacred blue lily plant in some of their religious rituals or just symbolically, it has been suggested that Egyptian religion once revolved around the ritualistic ingestion of the far more psychoactive Psilocybe cubensis mushroom, and that the Egyptian White Crown, Triple Crown, and Atef Crown were evidently designed to represent pin-stages of this mushroom. There is also evidence for the use of psilocybin mushrooms in Ivory Coast. Numerous other plants used in shamanic ritual in Africa, such as Silene capensis sacred to the Xhosa, are yet to be investigated by western science. A recent revitalization has occurred in the study of southern African psychoactives and entheogens (Mitchell and Hudson 2004; Sobiecki 2002, 2008, 2012).

Among the amaXhosa, the artificial drug 2C-B is used as entheogen by traditional healers or amagqirha over their traditional plants; they refer to the chemical as Ubulawu Nomathotholo, which roughly translates to "Medicine of the Singing Ancestors".

==== East Africa ====
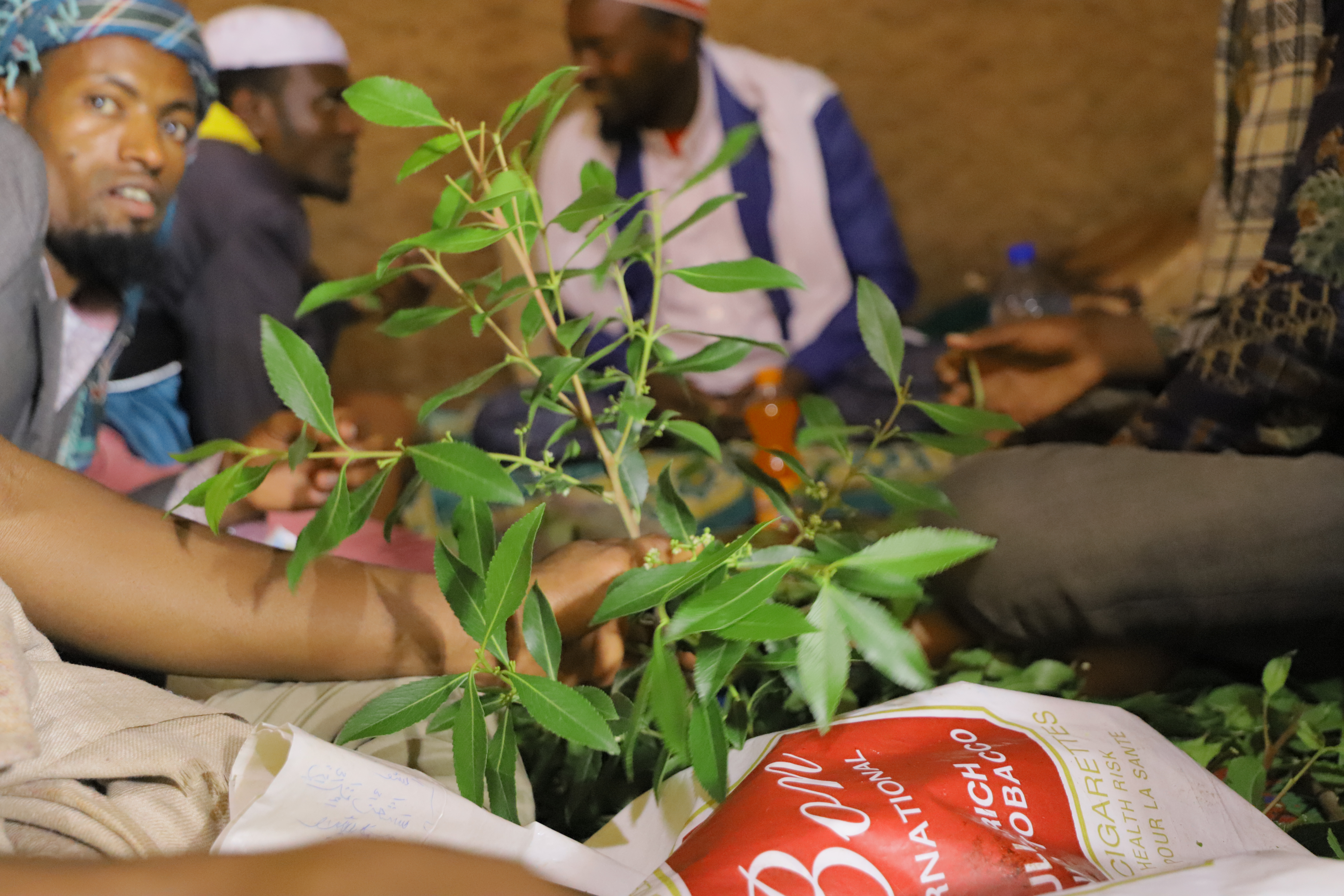
Khat leaves of Harar

For centuries, religious leaders have consumed the khat leaves to stay awake during long nights of prayer.

=== Americas ===
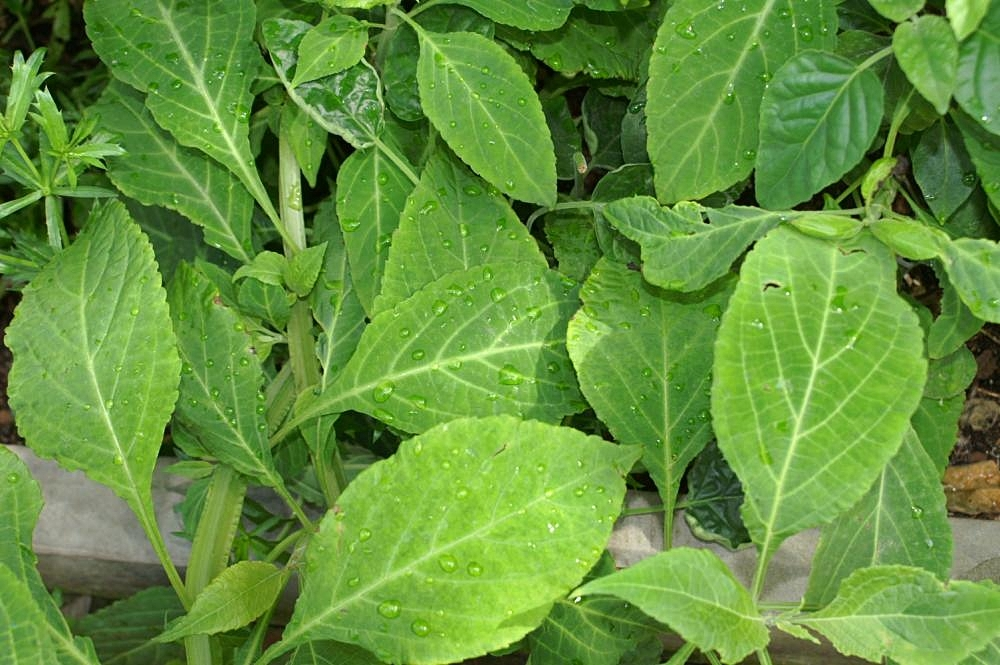
Salvia divinorum

Entheogens have played a pivotal role in the spiritual practices of most American cultures for millennia. The first American entheogen to be subject to scientific analysis was the peyote cactus (Lophophora williamsii). One of the founders of modern ethno-botany, Richard Evans Schultes of Harvard University documented the ritual use of peyote cactus among the Kiowa, who live in what became Oklahoma. While it was used traditionally by many cultures of what is now Mexico, in the 19th century its use spread throughout North America, replacing the toxic mescal bean (Calia secundiflora). Other well-known entheogens used by Mexican cultures include the alcoholic Aztec sacrament pulque, ritual tobacco (known as 'picietl' to the Aztecs, and 'sikar' to the Maya (from where the word 'cigar' derives)), psilocybin mushrooms, morning glories (Ipomoea tricolor and Ipomoea corymbosa), and Salvia divinorum.

Datura wrightii is sacred to some Native Americans and has been used in ceremonies and rites of passage by Chumash, Tongva, and others. Among the Chumash, when a boy was 8 years old, his mother would give him a preparation of momoy to drink. This supposed spiritual challenge should help the boy develop the spiritual wellbeing that is required to become a man. Not all of the boys undergoing this ritual survived. Momoy was also used to enhance spiritual wellbeing among adults. For instance, during a frightening situation, such as when seeing a coyote walk like a man, a leaf of momoy was sucked to help keep the soul in the body.

The mescal bean Sophora secundiflora was used by the shamanic hunter-gatherer cultures of the Great Plains region. Other plants with ritual significance in North American shamanism are the hallucinogenic seeds of the Texas buckeye and jimsonweed (Datura stramonium). Paleoethnobotanical evidence for these plants from archaeological sites shows they were used in ancient times thousands of years ago.

==== South America ====
Entheogenic plants in South America have deep roots in Indigenous traditions, often serving as tools for healing, divination, cosmological instruction, and social cohesion. The region hosts some of the most diverse and culturally embedded uses of psychoactive flora known worldwide.

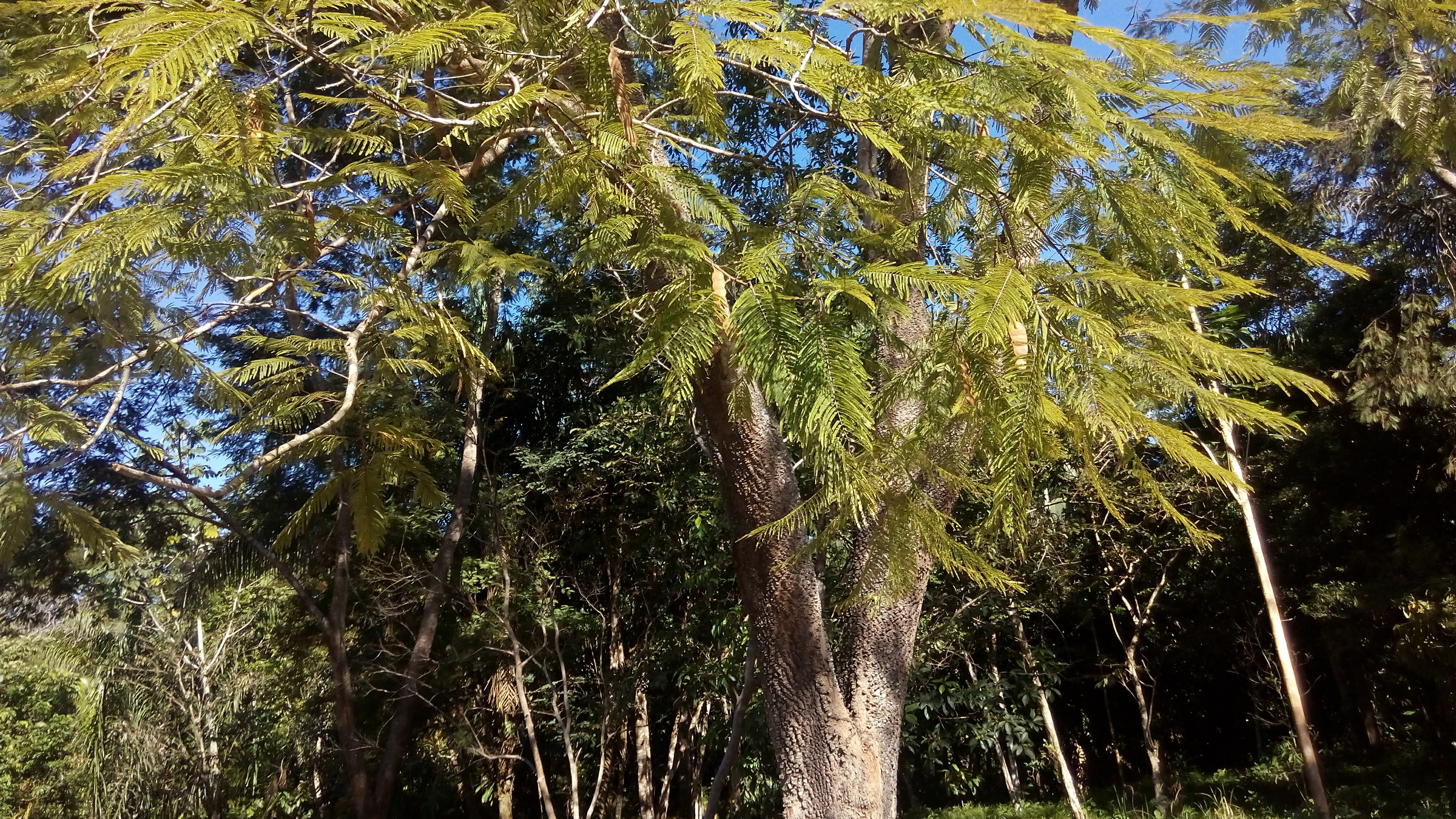
Anadenanthera peregrina

For thousands of years, the genus Anadenanthera, particularly A. peregrina (yopo or cohoba) and A. colubrina (willka, vilca, cebil), has been central to ritual practice across the continent. Its seeds are traditionally processed into powdered snuff tablets and used by Native American groups such as the Yanomami, Sikuani, and Piapoco. Among the Piaroa (hüottüja) of the Upper Orinoco, A. peregrina is known as Ñuá and used via nasal inhalation. In Andean areas, A. colubrina—known by names like willka, vilca, or cebil—is used in smokes or ritual beverages such as "llampu," documented among the Wichí, Wari and Ayacucho communities. Archaeological evidence from a precolonial site in eastern Puerto Rico dated to approximately A.D. 1150–1250 indicates that Anadenanthera peregrina was also used in the Caribbean, where its seeds were processed into cohoba snuff.

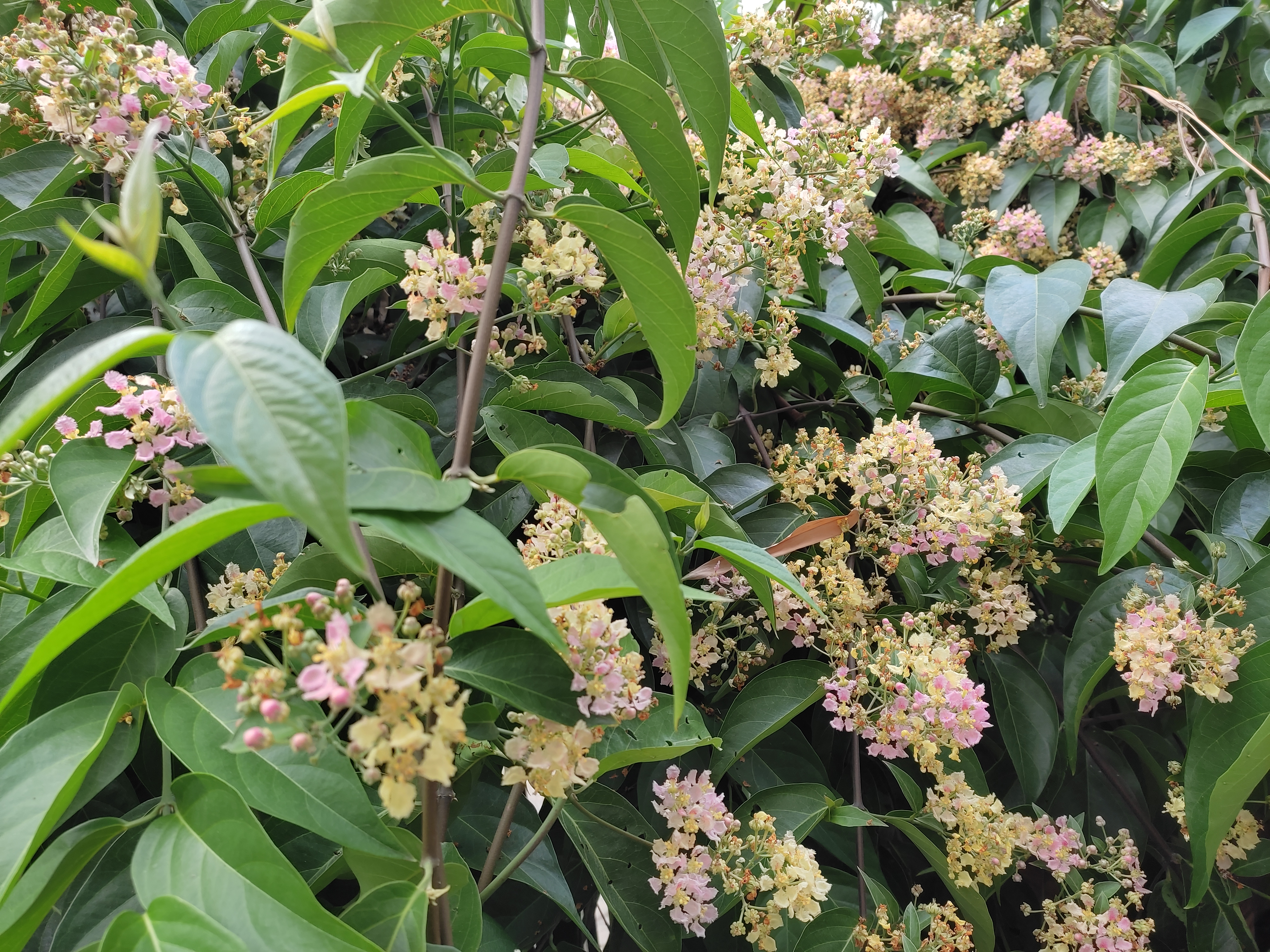
Banisteriopsis caapi flower

The vine Banisteriopsis caapi, often combined with plants like Psychotria viridis or Diplopterys cabrerana, forms a visionary decoction known regionally as ayahuasca, yagé, natem, oni, orunampa, or kamarampi—among over 40 indigenous names across Colombia, Ecuador, Peru, Bolivia, and Brazil. User groups include the Shipibo-Conibo, Siona, Inga, Kofan, Asháninka, and Shuar peoples. Its ceremonial use supports healing, divination, dream‑work, and communal harmony, guided by singing icaros and led by experienced practitioners called ayahuasqueros or taitas.

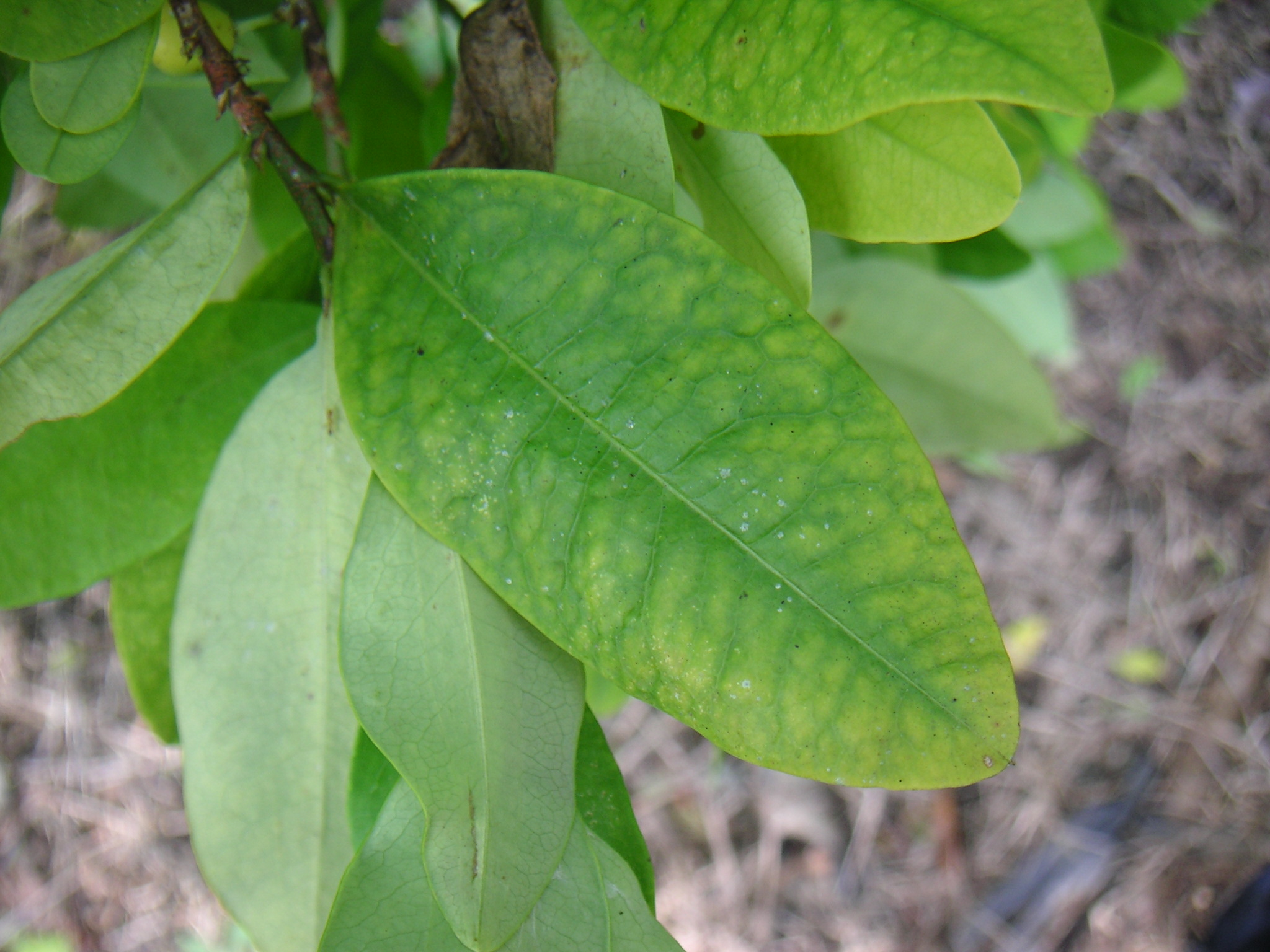
Coca leaves

The coca leaf (Erythroxylum coca) holds deep medicinal, ritual, and cultural significance for indigenous peoples across the Andean and Amazonian regions. Traditionally, coca is chewed or prepared as mambe, a fine powder made by roasting and mixing coca leaves with alkaline ash (often from Cecropia or yarumo trees), which is traditionally combined with ambil, a sticky paste made of tobacco. Among groups such as the Uitoto, Muinane, and Andoque, mambe is consumed during ceremonial gatherings to support dialogue, memory, and spiritual clarity. The plant is regarded as a sacred ally that fosters connection and communication rather than intoxication.

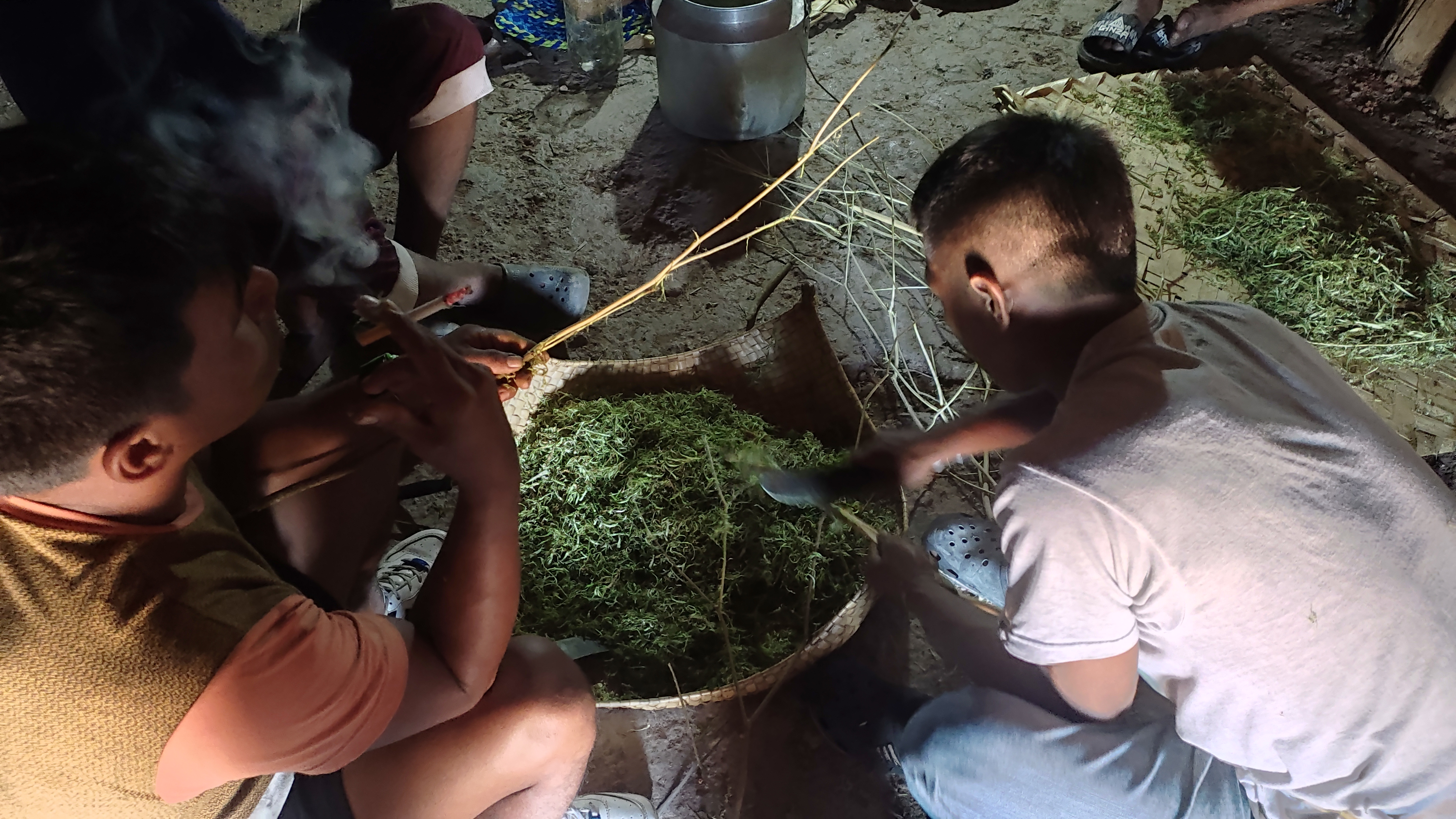
Malouetia sp beverage preparation (Dädä)

Among the Piaroa (or Hüottüja) people of the Venezuelan Amazon, Malouetia sp.—known as dädä—plays a central role in ceremonial life. It is considered the most important sacred medicine within their tradition, surpassing all others in ritual significance. Administered in highly codified contexts, its use involves periods of fasting, purification, and spiritual preparation. The plant is reserved for complex communal rituals aimed at restoring social balance, receiving guidance from ancestral spirits, and deepening cosmological understanding. The dädä ritual is unique to the Piaroa, and no other indigenous group is currently known to maintain this tradition at a comparable scale or regularity.

Rapé is a ceremonial snuff primarily made from Nicotiana rustica (mapacho), often blended with alkaline ashes to enhance nasal absorption. It is used by numerous Amazonian peoples. The ashes derive from trees such as Theobroma, Cecropia, or murití; their inclusion alkalinizes the mixture and potentiates the tobacco's effects. Administration is typically performed by a shaman or specialist who blows the powder into the recipient's nostrils, although it can also be self-administered using short tubes.

A ritual use by the Quechua people involves drinking guayusa infusion to have foretelling dreams for successful hunting expeditions.

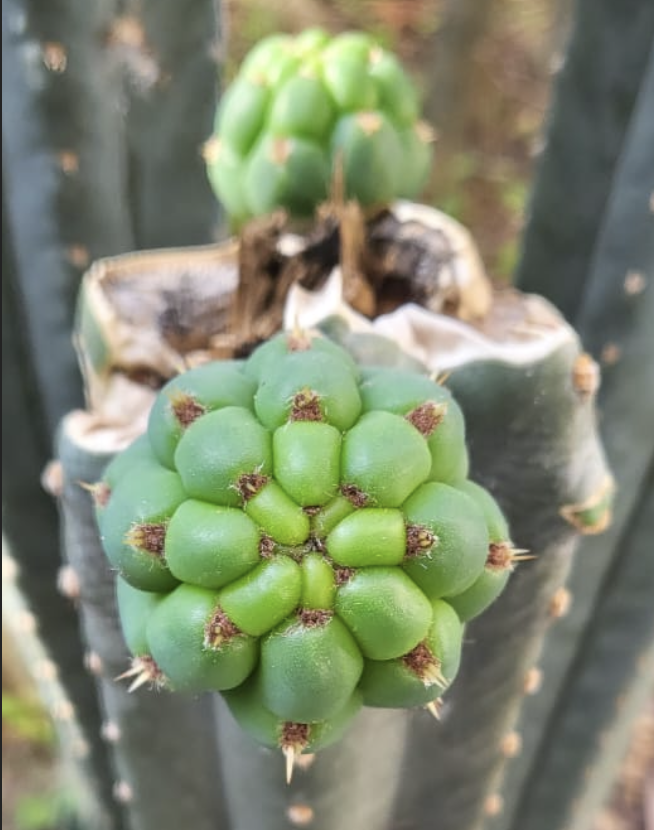
San Pedro (Wachuma, huachuma)

Trichocereus macrogonus var. pachanoi has a long history of being used in Andean traditional medicine. Archaeological studies have found evidence of use going back two thousand years, to Moche culture, Nazca culture, and Chavín culture. In 2022, the Peruvian Ministry of Culture declared the traditional use of San Pedro cactus in northern Peru as cultural heritage.

=== Asia ===
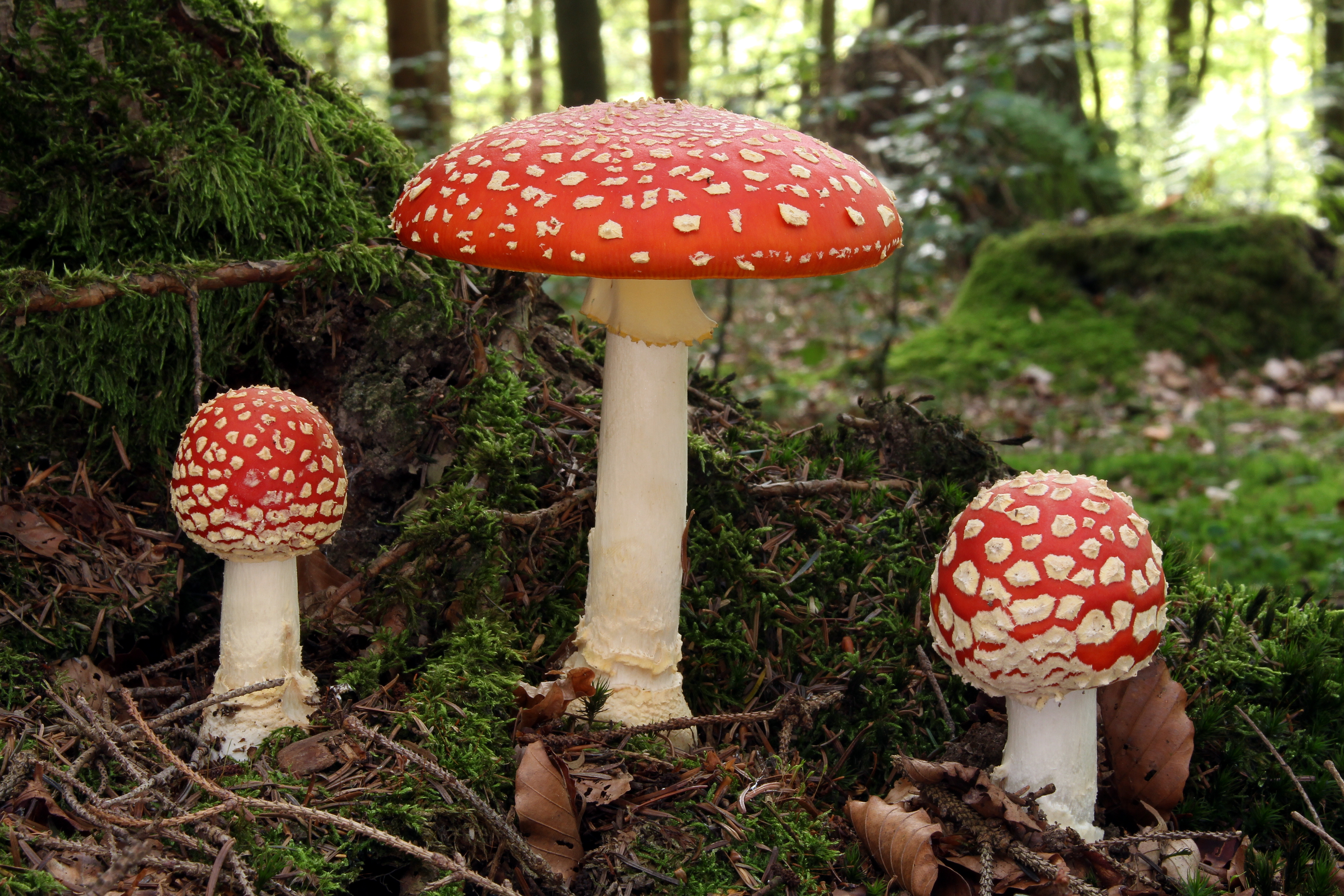
Fliegenpilz fly agaric Amanita muscaria

The indigenous peoples of Siberia (from whom the term shaman was borrowed) have used Amanita muscaria as an entheogen.

In Hinduism, Datura stramonium and cannabis have been used in religious ceremonies, although the religious use of datura is not common, as the primary alkaloids are strong deliriants, which causes serious intoxication with unpredictable effects.

Also, the ancient drink Soma, mentioned often in the Vedas, appears to be consistent with the effects of an entheogen. In his 1967 book, Wasson argues that Soma was Amanita muscaria. The active ingredient of Soma is presumed by some to be ephedrine, an alkaloid with stimulant properties derived from the soma plant, identified as Ephedra pachyclada. However, there are also arguments about the botanical identity of soma–haoma suggesting it could have also been Syrian rue, cannabis, Atropa belladonna, or some combination of any of the above plants.

==== West Asia ====
The earliest credible evidence of either coffee drinking or knowledge of the coffee tree appears in the middle of the 15th century, in Yemen's Sufi monasteries. The Sufi monks drank coffee as an aid to concentration and even spiritual intoxication when they chanted the name of God.

=== Europe ===
Fermented honey, known in Northern Europe as mead, was an early entheogen in Aegean civilization, predating the introduction of wine, which was the more familiar entheogen of the reborn Dionysus and the maenads. Its religious uses in the Aegean world are intertwined with the mythology of the bee.

Dacians were known to use cannabis in their religious and important life ceremonies, proven by discoveries of large clay pots with burnt cannabis seeds in ancient tombs and religious shrines. Also, local oral folklore and myths tell of ancient priests that dreamed with gods and walked in the smoke. Their names, as transmitted by Herodotus, were "kap-no-batai" which in Dacian was supposed to mean "the ones that walk in the clouds".

The growth of Roman Christianity also saw the end of the two-thousand-year-old tradition of the Eleusinian Mysteries, the initiation ceremony for the cult of Demeter and Persephone involving the use of a drug known as kykeon. The term 'ambrosia' is used in Greek mythology in a way that is remarkably similar to the Soma of the Hindus as well.

A theory that naturally occurring gases like ethylene used by inhalation may have played a role in divinatory ceremonies at Delphi in Classical Greece received popular press attention in the early 2000s, yet has not been conclusively proven.

Mushroom consumption is part of the culture of Europeans in general, with particular importance to Slavic and Baltic peoples. Some academics argue that the use of psilocybin- and/or muscimol-containing mushrooms was an integral part of the ancient culture of the Rus' people.

=== Middle East ===
It has been suggested that the ritual use of small amounts of Syrian rue is an artifact of its ancient use in higher doses as an entheogen (possibly in conjunction with DMT-containing acacia).

John Marco Allegro argued that early Jewish and Christian cultic practice was based on the use of Amanita muscaria, which was later forgotten by its adherents, but this view has been widely disputed.

=== Oceania ===
In general, indigenous Australians are thought not to have used entheogens, although there is a strong barrier of secrecy surrounding Aboriginal shamanism, which has likely limited what has been told to outsiders.

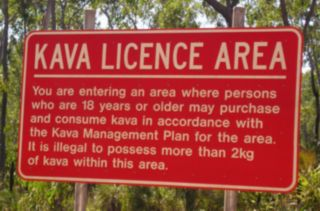
A sign showing a "Kava licence area" at Yirrkala, in the Northern Territory of Australia

Kava or kava kava (Piper Methysticum) has been cultivated for at least 3,000 years by a number of Pacific island-dwelling peoples. Historically, most Polynesian, many Melanesian, and some Micronesian cultures have ingested the psychoactive pulverized root, typically taking it mixed with water. In these traditions, taking kava is believed to facilitate contact with the spirits of the dead, especially relatives and ancestors.

There are no known uses of entheogens by the Māori of New Zealand aside from a variant species of kava, although some modern scholars have claimed that there may be evidence of psilocybin mushroom use. Natives of Papua New Guinea are known to use several species of entheogenic mushrooms (Psilocybe spp, Boletus manicus).

Pituri, also known as mingkulpa, is a mixture of leaves and wood ash traditionally chewed as a stimulant (or, after extended use, a depressant) by Aboriginal Australians widely across the continent. Leaves are gathered from any of several species of native tobacco (Nicotiana) or from at least one distinct population of the species Duboisia hopwoodii. Various species of Acacia, Grevillea and Eucalyptus are burned to produce the ash. The term "pituri" may also refer to the plants from which the leaves are gathered or from which the ash is made. Some authors use the term to refer only to the plant Duboisia hopwoodii and its leaves and any chewing mixture containing its leaves.

== In religion ==
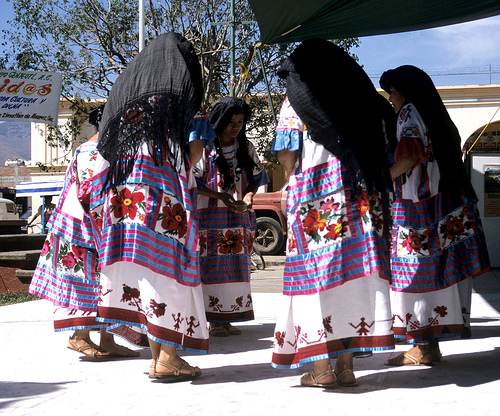
Mazatec people performing a Salvia ritual dance in Huautla de Jiménez

Shamans all over the world and in different cultures have traditionally used drugs, especially psychedelics, for their religious experiences. In these communities the absorption of drugs leads to dreams (visions) through sensory distortion. The psychedelic experience is often compared to non-ordinary forms of consciousness such as those experienced in meditation, and mystical experiences. Ego dissolution is often described as a key feature of the psychedelic experience.

Entheogens used in the contemporary world include biota like peyote (Native American Church), extracts like ayahuasca (Santo Daime, União do Vegetal).

Entheogens also play an important role in contemporary religious movements such as the Rastafari movement.

=== Hinduism ===
Bhang is an edible preparation of cannabis native to the Indian subcontinent. It has been used in food and drink as early as 1000 BCE by Hindus in ancient India. The earliest known reports regarding the sacred status of cannabis in the Indian subcontinent come from the Atharva Veda estimated to have been written sometime around 2000–1400 BCE, which mentions cannabis as one of the "five sacred plants... which release us from anxiety" and that a guardian angel resides in its leaves. The Vedas also refer to it as a "source of happiness", "joy-giver" and "liberator", and in the Raja Valabba, the gods send hemp to the human race.

=== Buddhism ===
It has been suggested that the Amanita muscaria mushroom was used by the Tantric Buddhist mahasiddha tradition of the 8th to 12th century.

In the West, some modern Buddhist teachers have written on the usefulness of psychedelics. The Buddhist magazine Tricycle devoted their entire fall 1996 edition to this issue. Some teachers such as Jack Kornfield have suggested the possibility that psychedelics could complement Buddhist practice, bring healing and help people understand their connection with everything which could lead to compassion. Kornfield warns however that addiction can still be a hindrance. Other teachers such as Michelle McDonald-Smith expressed views which saw entheogens as not conducive to Buddhist practice ("I don't see them developing anything").

=== Judaism ===
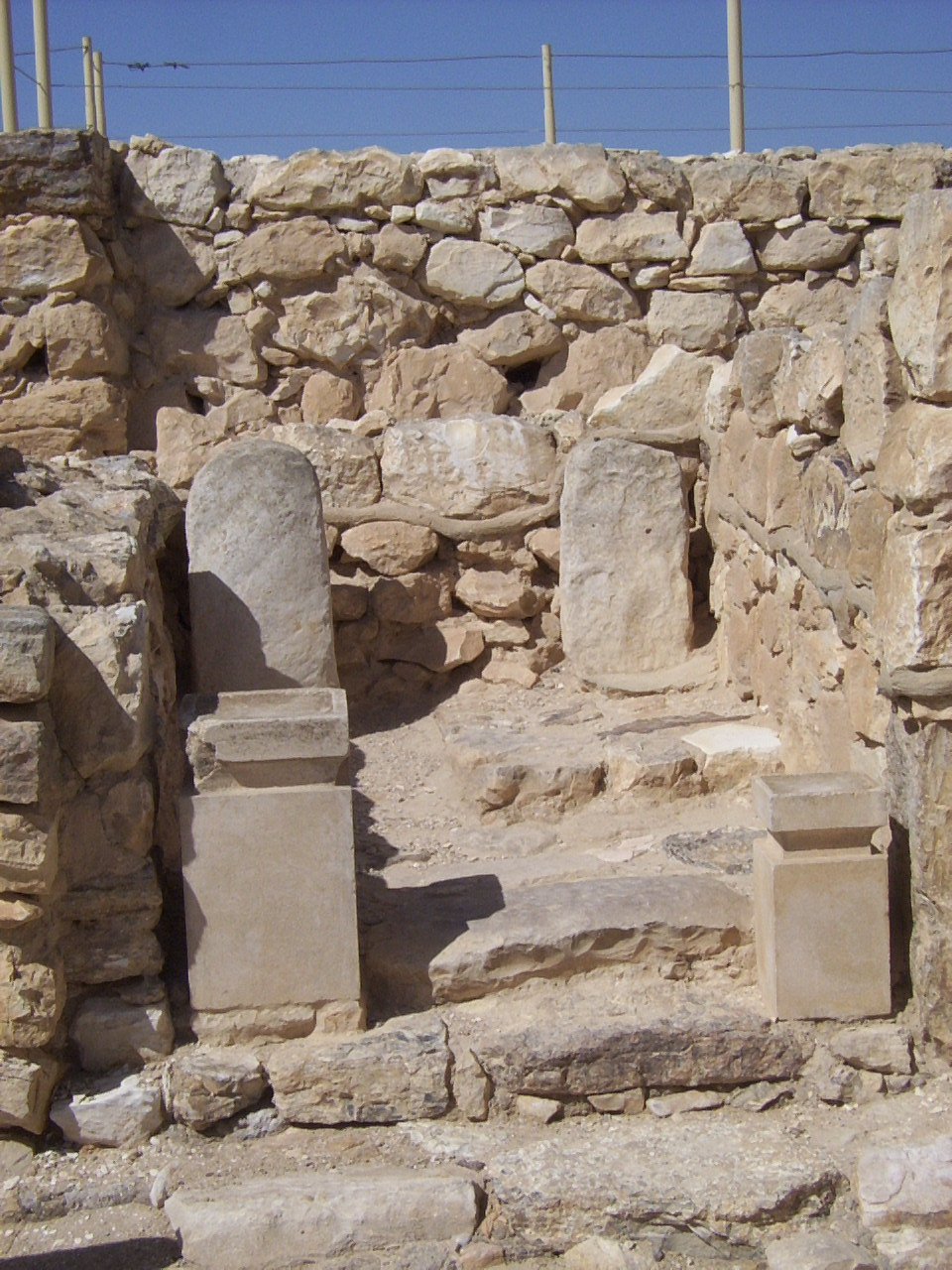
The shrine at Tel Arad, where the earliest use of cannabis in the Near East is thought to have occurred during the Kingdom of Judah

The primary advocate of the religious use of cannabis in early Judaism was Polish anthropologist Sula Benet, who claimed that the plant kaneh bosem קְנֵה-בֹשֶׂם mentioned five times in the Hebrew Bible, and used in the holy anointing oil of the Book of Exodus, was cannabis. According to theories that hold that cannabis was present in Ancient Israelite society, a variant of hashish is held to have been present. In 2020, it was announced that cannabis residue had been found on the Israelite sanctuary altar at Tel Arad dating to the 8th century BCE of the Kingdom of Judah, suggesting that cannabis was a part of some Israelite rituals at the time.

While Benet's conclusion regarding the psychoactive use of cannabis is not universally accepted among Jewish scholars, there is general agreement that cannabis is used in talmudic sources to refer to hemp fibers, not hashish, as hemp was a vital commodity before linen replaced it. Lexicons of Hebrew and dictionaries of plants of the Bible such as by Michael Zohary (1985), Hans Arne Jensen (2004) and James A. Duke (2010) and others identify the plant in question as either Acorus calamus or Cymbopogon citratus, not cannabis.

=== Christianity ===
Scholars such as Ammon Hillman suggest that a variety of drug use, recreational and otherwise, is to be found in the early history of the Church.

The historical picture portrayed by the Entheos journal is of fairly widespread use of visionary plants in early Christianity and the surrounding culture, with a gradual reduction of use of entheogens in Christianity. R. Gordon Wasson's book Soma prints a letter from art historian Erwin Panofsky asserting that art scholars are aware of many "mushroom trees" in Christian art.

The question of the extent of visionary plant use throughout the history of Christian practice has barely been considered yet by academic or independent scholars. The question of whether visionary plants were used in pre-Theodosian Christianity is distinct from evidence that indicates the extent to which visionary plants were utilized or forgotten in later Christianity, including heretical or quasi-Christian groups, and the question of other groups such as elites or laity within orthodox Catholic practice.

The Temple of the True Inner Light is an eclectic revisionist Christian psychedelic church based in New York City which was founded in 1980 and believes that psychedelic drugs such as dipropyltryptamine (DPT) are the physical form of God. Unlike many other psychedelic churches and religions, the temple believes that entheogens are not simply a means to access God but literally are God.

=== Peyotism ===
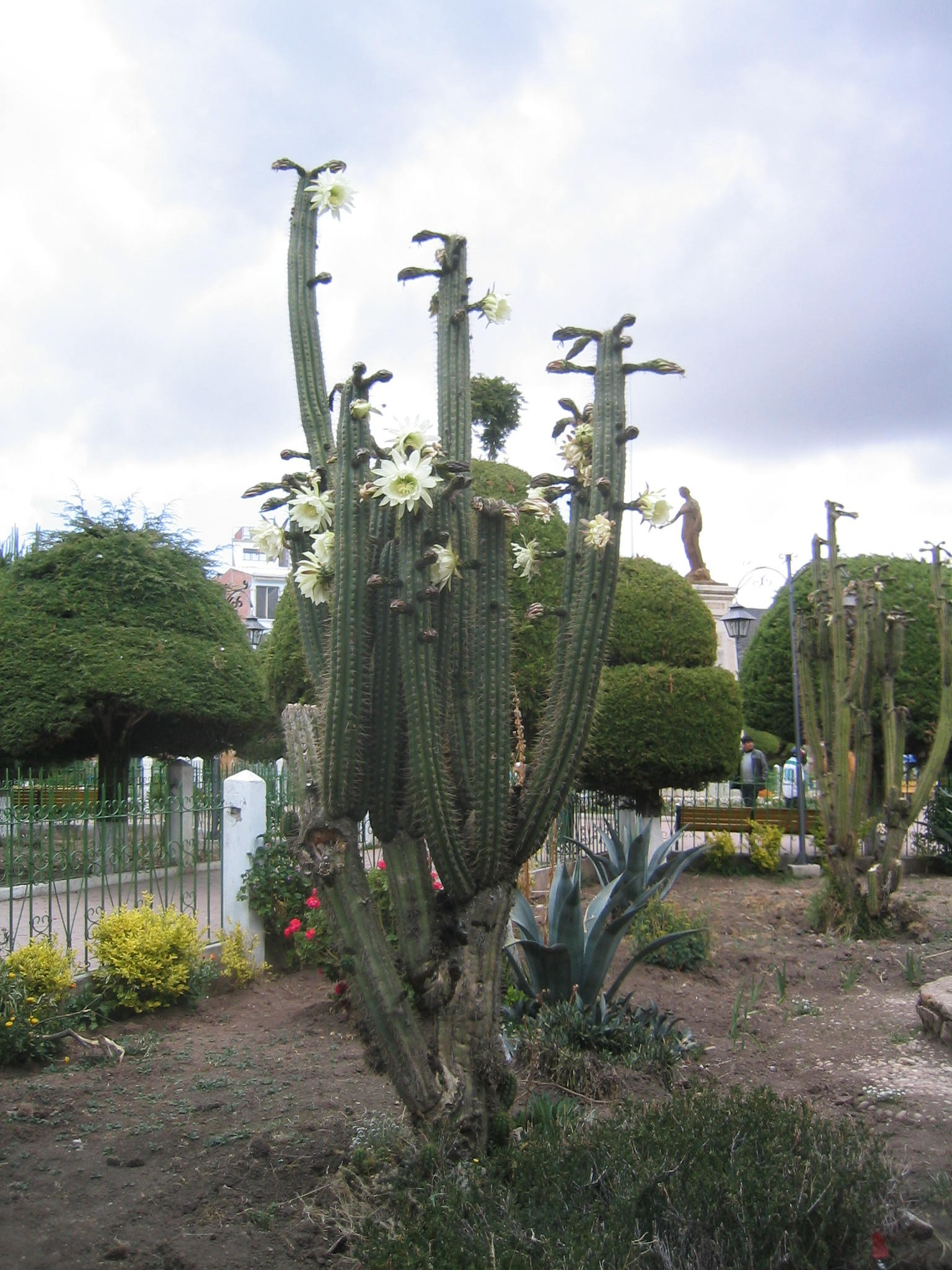
Flowering San Pedro, an entheogenic cactus that has been used for over 3,000 years. Today the vast majority of extracted mescaline is from columnar cacti, not vulnerable peyote.

The Native American Church (NAC) is also known as Peyotism and Peyote Religion. Peyotism is a Native American religion characterized by mixed traditional as well as Protestant beliefs and by sacramental use of the entheogen peyote.

The Peyote Way Church of God believe that "Peyote is a holy sacrament, when taken according to our sacramental procedure and combined with a holistic lifestyle".

=== Santo Daime ===
Santo Daime is a syncretic religion founded in the 1930s in the Brazilian Amazonian state of Acre by Raimundo Irineu Serra, known as Mestre Irineu. Santo Daime incorporates elements of several religious or spiritual traditions including Folk Catholicism, Kardecist Spiritism, African animism and indigenous South American shamanism, including vegetalismo.

Ceremonies – trabalhos (Brazilian Portuguese for "works") – are typically several hours long and are undertaken sitting in silent "concentration", or sung collectively, dancing according to simple steps in geometrical formation. Ayahuasca, referred to as Daime within the practice, which contains several psychoactive compounds, is drunk as part of the ceremony. The drinking of Daime can induce a strong emetic effect which is embraced as both emotional and physical purging.

=== União do Vegetal ===
União do Vegetal (UDV) is a religious society founded on July 22, 1961, by José Gabriel da Costa, known as Mestre Gabriel. The translation of União do Vegetal is Union of the Plants referring to the sacrament of the UDV, Hoasca tea (also known as ayahuasca). This beverage is made by boiling two plants, Mariri (Banisteriopsis caapi) and Chacrona (Psychotria viridis), both of which are native to the Amazon rainforest.

In its sessions, UDV members drink Hoasca Tea for the effect of mental concentration. In Brazil, the use of Hoasca in religious rituals was regulated by the Brazilian Federal Government's National Drug Policy Council on January 25, 2010. The policy established legal norms for the religious institutions that responsibly use this tea. The Supreme Court of the United States unanimously affirmed the UDV's right to use Hoasca tea in its religious sessions in the United States, in a decision published on February 21, 2006.

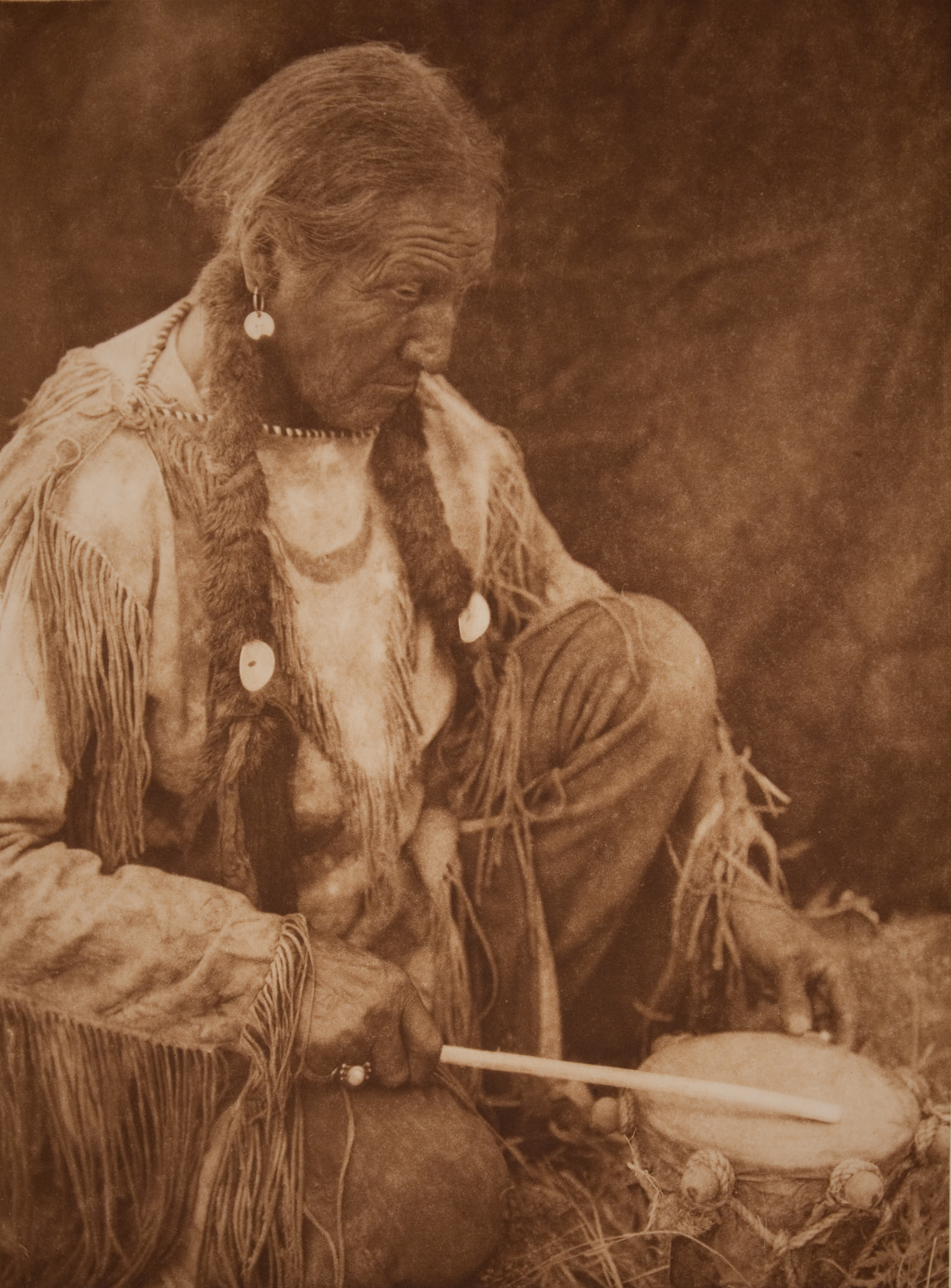
A Native American peyote drummer (c. 1927)

=== Thelema ===
The Thelema ceremony calls for five officers: a Priest, a Priestess, a Deacon, and two adult acolytes, called "the Children". The end of the ritual culminates in the consummation of the eucharist, consisting of a goblet of wine and a Cake of Light, after which the congregant proclaims "There is no part of me that is not of the gods!"

== Research ==
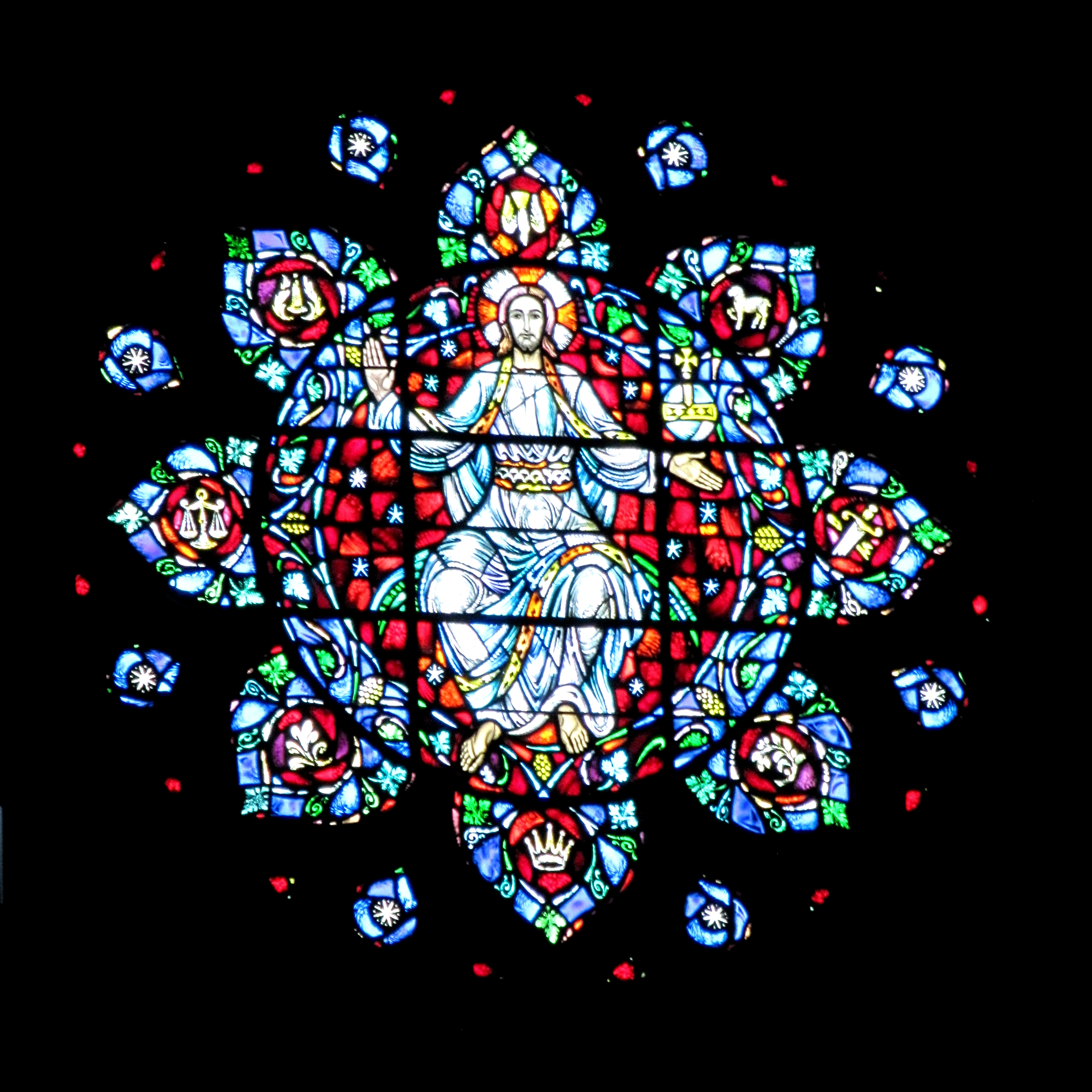
Mandala-like round window above the altar at Boston University's Marsh Chapel, site of Marsh Chapel Experiment

Notable early testing of the entheogenic experience includes the Marsh Chapel Experiment, conducted by physician and theology doctoral candidate Walter Pahnke under the supervision of psychologist Timothy Leary and the Harvard Psilocybin Project. In this double-blind experiment, volunteer graduate school divinity students from the Boston area almost all claimed to have had profound religious experiences subsequent to the ingestion of pure psilocybin.

Beginning in 2006, experiments have been conducted at Johns Hopkins University, showing that under controlled conditions psilocybin causes mystical experiences in most participants and that they rank the personal and spiritual meaningfulness of the experiences very highly.

Except in Mexico, research with psychedelics is limited due to ongoing widespread drug prohibition. The amount of peer-reviewed research on psychedelics has accordingly been limited due to the difficulty of getting approval from institutional review boards. Furthermore, scientific studies on entheogens present some significant challenges to researchers, including philosophical questions relating to ontology, epistemology and objectivity.

In recent decades, entheogens have been revisited in clinical research for their potential therapeutic benefits. According to Richards (2009), studies have shown promise in treating depression, post-traumatic stress disorder (PTSD), and anxiety associated with terminal illness using substances such as psilocybin and MDMA.

This modern research highlights a shift toward integrating the traditional spiritual insights associated with entheogens into clinical practice, promoting healing and psychological growth.

== Legal status ==
=== By entheogen ===
- Psychoactive Amanita mushrooms: Legal status of psychoactive Amanita mushrooms
- Ayuahuasca: Legal status of ayahuasca by country
- Psychoactive cactus: Legal status of psychoactive cactus by country
- Cannabis: Legality of cannabis (Global cannabis legalization table)
- Ibogaine: Legal status of ibogaine by country
- Psilocybin mushrooms: Legal status of psilocybin mushrooms
- Salvia divinorum: Legal status of Salvia divinorum

=== By country or territory ===
Some countries have legislation that allows for traditional entheogen use.

==== Australia ====
Between 2011 and 2012, the Australian Federal Government was considering changes to the Australian Criminal Code that would classify any plants containing any amount of DMT as "controlled plants". DMT itself was already controlled under current laws. The proposed changes included other similar blanket bans for other substances, such as a ban on any and all plants containing mescaline or ephedrine. The proposal was not pursued after political embarrassment on realisation that this would make the official Floral Emblem of Australia, Acacia pycnantha (golden wattle), illegal. The Therapeutic Goods Administration and federal authority had considered a motion to ban the same, but this was withdrawn in May 2012 (as DMT may still hold potential entheogenic value to native or religious peoples).

==== United States ====
In 1963 in Sherbert v. Verner the Supreme Court established the Sherbert Test, which consists of four criteria that are used to determine if an individual's right to religious free exercise has been violated by the government. The test is as follows:

For the individual, the court must determine

- whether the person has a claim involving a sincere religious belief, and
- whether the government action is a substantial burden on the person's ability to act on that belief.

If these two elements are established, then the government must prove

- that it is acting in furtherance of a "compelling state interest", and
- that it has pursued that interest in the manner least restrictive, or least burdensome, to religion.

This test was eventually all-but-eliminated in Employment Division v. Smith 494 U.S. 872 (1990) which held that a "neutral law of general applicability" was not subject to the test. Congress resurrected it for the purposes of federal law in the federal Religious Freedom Restoration Act (RFRA) of 1993.

In City of Boerne v. Flores, 521 U.S. 507 (1997) RFRA was held to trespass on state sovereignty, and application of the RFRA was essentially limited to federal law enforcement. In Gonzales v. O Centro Espírita Beneficente União do Vegetal, 546 U.S. 418 (2006), a case involving only federal law, RFRA was held to permit a church's use of a DMT-containing tea for religious ceremonies.

Some states have enacted State Religious Freedom Restoration Acts intended to mirror the federal RFRA's protections.

Peyote is listed by the United States DEA as a Schedule I controlled substance. However, practitioners of the Peyote Way Church of God, a Native American religion, perceive the regulations regarding the use of peyote as discriminating, leading to religious discrimination issues regarding about the U.S. policy towards drugs. As the result of Peyote Way Church of God, Inc. v. Thornburgh the American Indian Religious Freedom Act of 1978 was passed. This federal statute allow the "Traditional Indian religious use of the peyote sacrament", exempting only use by Native American persons.

== In literature ==
Many works of literature have described entheogen use; some of those are:

- The drug melange (spice) in Frank Herbert's Dune universe acts as both an entheogen (in large enough quantities) and an addictive geriatric medicine. Control of the supply of melange was crucial to the Empire, as it was necessary for, among other things, faster-than-light (folding space) navigation.
- Consumption of the imaginary mushroom anochi [enoki] as the entheogen underlying the creation of Christianity is the premise of Philip K. Dick's last novel, The Transmigration of Timothy Archer, a theme that seems to be inspired by John Allegro's book.
- Aldous Huxley's final novel, Island (1962), depicted a fictional psychoactive mushroom – termed "moksha medicine" – used by the people of Pala in rites of passage, such as the transition to adulthood and at the end of life.
- Bruce Sterling's Holy Fire novel refers to the religion in the future as a result of entheogens, used freely by the population.
- In Stephen King's The Dark Tower: The Gunslinger, Book 1 of The Dark Tower series, the main character receives guidance after taking mescaline.
- The Alastair Reynolds novel Absolution Gap features a moon under the control of a religious government that uses neurological viruses to induce religious faith.
- A critical examination of the ethical and societal implications and relevance of "entheogenic" experiences can be found in Daniel Waterman and Casey William Hardison's book Entheogens, Society & Law: Towards a Politics of Consciousness, Autonomy and Responsibility (Melrose, Oxford 2013). This book includes a controversial analysis of the term entheogen arguing that Wasson et al. were mystifying the effects of the plants and traditions to which it refers.

== See also ==
- List of Acacia species known to contain psychoactive alkaloids
- List of investigational hallucinogens and entactogens
- List of plants used for smoking
- List of psychoactive plants
- List of psychoactive plants, fungi, and animals
- List of substances used in rituals
- Dimethyltryptamine (DMT)
- Psilocybin mushrooms
- Psychedelic Cults and Outlaw Churches
- Psychedelic therapy
- Psychoactive Amanita mushrooms
- Psychoactive cacti
- Psychology of religion
- Religion and alcohol
- Scholarly approaches to mysticism
- The Entheogen Review
