= Harvard Psilocybin Project =

Series of psychological research studies into the effects of psychedelics

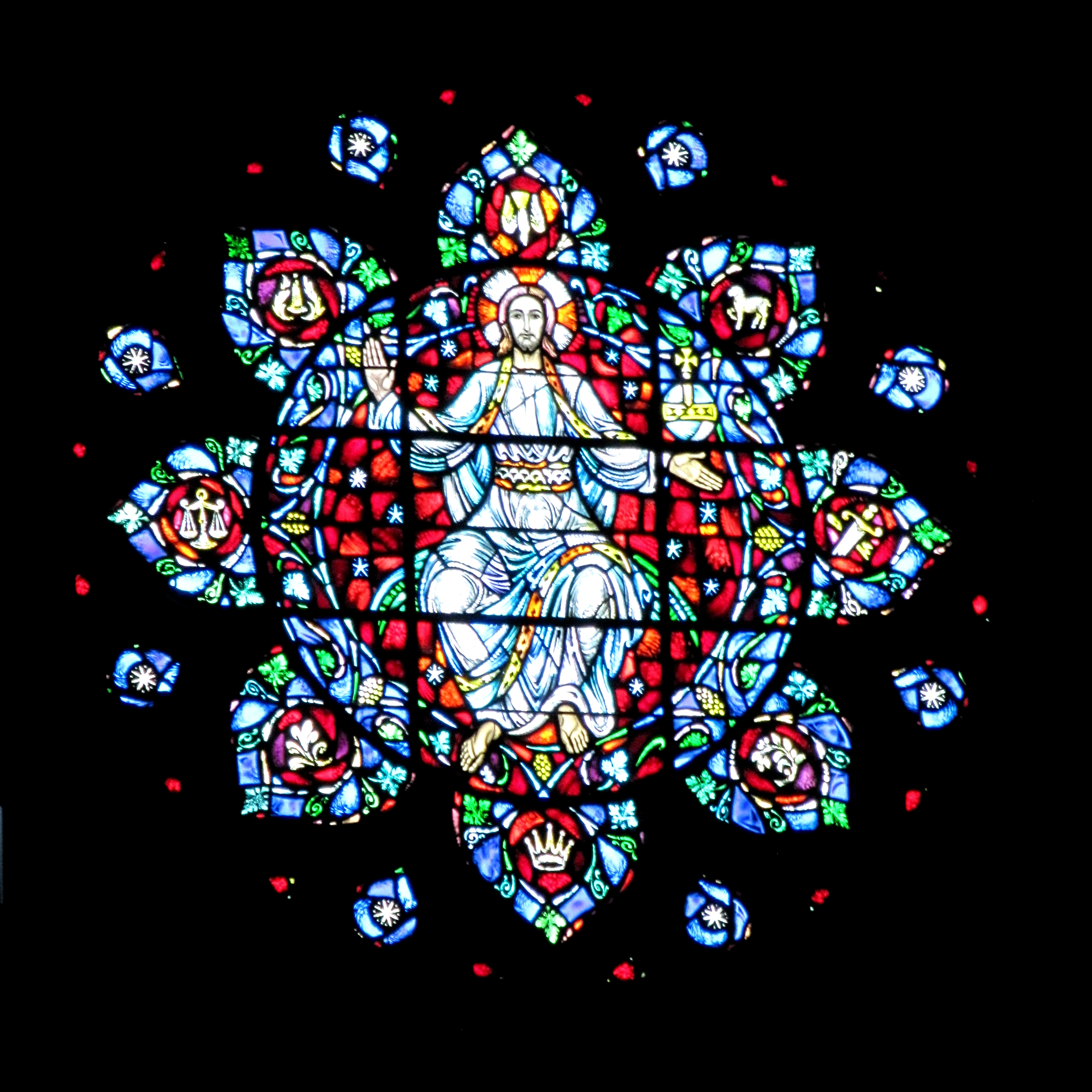
Round window above the altar at Boston University's Marsh Chapel, site of the Harvard Psilocybin Project's Marsh Chapel Experiment

The Harvard Psilocybin Project was a series of experiments aimed at exploring the effects of psilocybin and LSD intake on the human mind conducted by Timothy Leary and Richard Alpert. The founding board of the project consisted of Leary, Aldous Huxley, David McClelland (Leary's and Alpert's superior at Harvard University), Frank Barron, Ralph Metzner, and two graduate students who were working on a project with mescaline.

The experiments began some time in 1960 and lasted until March 1962, when other professors in the Harvard Center for Research in Personality raised concerns about the legitimacy and safety of the experiments in an internal meeting. Leary and Alpert's experiments were part of their personal discovery and advocacy of psychedelics. As such, their use of psilocybin and other psychedelics ranged from the academically sound and open Concord Prison Experiment, in which inmates were given psilocybin in an effort to reduce recidivism, and the Marsh Chapel Experiment, run by a Harvard Divinity School graduate student under Leary's supervision in which Boston area graduate divinity students were administered psilocybin as a part of a study designed to determine if the drug could facilitate the experience of profound religious states (where all ten divinity students reported such experiences), to frequent personal use.

Huston Smith's last work, Cleansing the Doors of Perception, describes the Harvard Psilocybin Project in which he participated in the early 1960s as a serious, conscientious, mature attempt to raise awareness of entheogenic substances. Of the members of the subgroup in which Smith took part, Leary is not listed.

== History ==
In 1960, Timothy Leary and Richard Alpert ordered psilocybin and LSD from Swiss-based company Sandoz with the intent to test if different administration modes lead to different experiences. To a greater extent, they believed that psychedelics could be the solution for the emotional problems of the Western man.

The first test group was composed of 38 people of various backgrounds. Soothing environments were chosen to conduct the experiments. Each subject controlled its own intake dosage, and the lead researchers Leary and Alpert also ingested the substance. This study led to the conclusions that, while 75% of the subjects in general described their trip as pleasant, 69% were considered to have reached a "marked broadening of awareness". 167 subjects in total participated to the 1960 study. At the end of the study, 95% of the subjects declared that the psilocybin experience had "changed their lives for the better".

In 1961, Leary decided to orient the study towards the possibility of psilocybin assisted rehabilitation of inmates. It resulted in the inmates being able to visualize themselves in a "cops-and-robbers game".

== Controversy ==
Other professors were concerned with Leary and Alpert's abuse of power over students. They pressured graduate students to participate in their research who they taught in a class required for the students' degrees. Additionally, Leary and Alpert gave psychedelics to undergraduate students despite the university only allowing graduate students to participate (a deal was passed with the administration to avoid this in 1961). The legitimacy of their research was questioned because Leary and Alpert also took psychedelics during the experiments, an accusation to which Leary replied that the researchers had to be in the same state of mind as the subject to understand his experience in the moment it happens. In 1961, two Harvard students ended up in the mental hospital after consuming psilocybin, and the Harvard administration started to dislike the project.

While Leary and Alpert were described as ridiculing the rules that were set by the school, they also said they did believe that nothing should deny someone the right to explore their inner self, or this would mean taking another step towards totalitarianism.

In addition, research participants were not selected according to random sampling. Many of these concerns were printed in The Harvard Crimson (edition 20 February 1962). Leary and Alpert immediately replied to the Crimson to attempt to rectify its negative tone. A few days later, Dana L. Farnsworth, director of Harvard University Health Services, also wrote to the Crimson to expose the risks related to the consumption of mescaline. Andrew Weil, a freshman who was not allowed in the research out of spite, wrote a “Hit Piece" on the research. Andrew Weil later apologized for his actions and betrayal of Leary, Alpert, and the others involved. A dispute rose on campus, which led the Harvard Center for Research in Personality to organize a meeting on 14 March 1962 to solve the issue.

The meeting turned into a trial against Leary and Alpert, and was reported in the Crimson by a journalist who discreetly assisted the meeting. This article accelerated the crisis. Local newspapers followed and published information about the drug scandal on university grounds. A member of the Massachusetts Department of Public Health stated the experiments led by Leary and Alpert should be conducted by "sober" researchers, followed by the state Food and Drug Administration which declared its intention to open an investigation on the psilocybin experiments.

In April, the state authorities finally decided to authorize the psilocybin experiments under the conditions that a (sober) physician is present during the experiments. When an advisory committee demanded Alpert give away his psilocybin to legal authorities for safe-keeping, he insisted on keeping some for his personal use. This outraged the committee, which never met again afterwards. It is believed that Leary and Alpert used Harvard stationary to order more psilocybin from Sandoz to stock up before leaving for their Zihuatanejo Project. Alpert's reputation on campus quickly became tainted.

There was concern amongst some students that "private psilocybin parties" were taking place. On 27 May 1963, Alpert was fired for distributing psilocybin to an undergraduate student.

At the time only Mescaline and the Peyote cactus were illegal. It would be five years until psilocybin and LSD were made illegal. Both Leary and Alpert had been rising academic stars until their battles with Harvard and their advocacy of the use of psychedelics made them major figures in the nascent counterculture.

== See also ==
- Psilocybin therapy
- Psychedelic therapy
- Albert Hofmann
