= Island (Huxley novel) =

1962 novel by Aldous Huxley

- First edition (UK)
- Author: Aldous Huxley
- Language: English
- Genre: Utopian fiction; philosophical fiction
- Publisher: Chatto & Windus (UK); Harper and Brothers (US)
- Publication date: 1962
- Publication place: United Kingdom
- Media type: Print (hardback and paperback)
- Pages: 384 pp (paperback edition)
- ISBN: 0-06-008549-5 (paperback edition)
- OCLC: 20156268
- Preceded by: The Genius and the Goddess
- Followed by: None

Island is a 1962 utopian manifesto and novel by English writer Aldous Huxley, the author's final work before his death in 1963. Although it has a plot, the plot largely serves to further conceptual explorations rather than setting up and resolving conventional narrative tension.

It is the account of Will Farnaby, a cynical journalist who is shipwrecked on the fictional island of Pala. Island is Huxley's utopian counterpart to his most famous work, the 1932 dystopian novel Brave New World. The ideas that would become Island can be seen in a foreword he wrote in 1946 to a new edition of Brave New World:

If I were now to rewrite the book, I would offer the Savage a third alternative. Between the Utopian and primitive horns of his dilemma would lie the possibility of sanity... In this community economics would be decentralist and Henry-Georgian, politics Kropotkinesque and co-operative. Science and technology would be used as though, like the Sabbath, they had been made for man, not (as at present and still more so in the Brave New World) as though man were to be adapted and enslaved to them. Religion would be the conscious and intelligent pursuit of man's Final End, the unitive knowledge of immanent Tao or Logos, the transcendent Godhead or Brahman. And the prevailing philosophy of life would be a kind of Higher Utilitarianism, in which the Greatest Happiness principle would be secondary to the Final End principle—the first question to be asked and answered in every contingency of life being: "How will this thought or action contribute to, or interfere with, the achievement, by me and the greatest possible number of other individuals, of man's Final End?"

== Plot summary ==
Englishman William Asquith "Will" Farnaby deliberately wrecks his boat on the shores of the Kingdom of Pala, an island halfway between Sumatra and the Andaman Islands, thus forcing his entry to this otherwise "forbidden island". Farnaby, a journalist, political huckster, and lackey for the oil baron Lord Joseph "Joe" Aldehyde, is tasked with persuading the island's current queen—the Rani—to sell Aldehyde rights to Pala's untapped oil assets. Farnaby awakens on the island with a leg injury, hearing a myna bird screaming "Attention", when a local boy and girl notice him and take him for medical treatment to their grandfather, Dr. Robert MacPhail. Dr. Robert and a young man named Murugan Mailendra carry Farnaby to Robert's house for a surprisingly successful hypnotherapy session led by Susila, Robert's daughter-in-law and the mother of the two children. Susila's husband Dugald (Robert's son) recently died in a climbing accident, and Susila is still grappling with the grief.

Farnaby and Murugan recognise each other from a recent meeting with Colonel Dipa, the military dictator of a threatening country called Rendang-Lobo that neighbours Pala—another force coveting Pala's oil. In private, Murugan reveals to Farnaby that he is in fact the Rani's son and will be assuming control over Pala in a few days as its new Raja. Both the Rani and Murugan were raised outside of Palanese culture, however, and so both are largely westernised, with Murugan especially influenced by materialism and consumerist greed. Contrary to these philosophies, most Palanese islanders engage in peaceful living, intellectual pursuits, and deep spiritualism that avoids superstition. The kingdom has no military and its inhabitants have cultivated a nearly utopian society by blending the most applicable elements from western science and eastern Mahayana Buddhism, also adopting a multiple-parents child-rearing strategy of mutual adoption clubs (MACs), as well as a bilingual culture of English and Palanese. Palanese citizens strive to live always in the moment, to directly confront suffering and death, to meditate often, to engage shamelessly in coitus reservatus called maithuna, and to use moksha-medicine—a local psychedelic drug or entheogen—to help achieve these other goals. The Rani, however, who comes to visit Farnaby and is theatrical, larger-than-life, and more traditionally religious, is disgusted by these mainstream Palanese values and wishes to reform the country. Farnaby convinces her that Joe Aldehyde's oil money will help her in her quest to "save" the nation from blasphemy.

As he recuperates, Farnaby reads Dr. Robert's copy of the Old Raja's Notes on What's What, and What It Might be Reasonable to do about What's What, which outlines Palanese practical philosophies for self-improvement and self-actualisation. He then tours the island's educational system, which merges the sciences, the arts, and self-control techniques with the personal search for spiritual self-fulfillment. Dr. Robert recounts the island's history, including how his own Scottish grandfather, Dr. Andrew MacPhail, was called to the island over a century ago to treat the Old Raja's facial tumour using both trance-based mesmerization and actual surgery; this first brought scientific practices and the English language into Palanese culture.

Farnaby sees many other aspects of Palanese society as well, including a marionette version of Oedipus Rex called Oedipus in Pala with a revised and happy ending. The Palanese are so intimately connected with the reality of the moment that they even have taught the local myna birds to say "Attention" and "Karuṇā", to remind the people to stay focused on the here-and-now and to have compassion. The Palanese people are well aware that they will likely be invaded soon by Colonel Dipa's forces from Rendang, though they are resigned to pacifism. Farnaby too has been accepting the potential downfall of the island as a given, though he realises with discomfort that he may be an instrumental factor in causing such a downfall.

Farnaby begins to establish a strong bond with Susila, who directs Farnaby to re-explore his own troubled past, including the death of his wife, Molly, on the night he confessed to cheating on her and his whole hateful childhood; Susila guides him through his painful memories. In the meantime, Susila's mother-in-law and Dr. Robert's wife, Lakshmi, is now also dying, due to cancer. One night, when the Rani urgently sends a letter to Farnaby to meet with her, he decides to finally take a stand against the exploitation of the island by Aldehyde and Dipa, and so he ignores her letter, instead going to visit the quickly-fading Lakshmi who, surrounded by her family, finally dies.

Susila then invites Farnaby to try the moksha-medicine at last. His ensuing hallucinatory visions are vividly philosophical and unspeakably vibrant; he feels a loss of self in the oneness of everything and "knowledgeless understanding", and he also horrifically watches a nearby mantis sexually cannibalise her partner, before Susila encourages him to let the medicine help him see the beauty in all things. As morning approaches, they suddenly hear gunfire and spot a caravan of military vehicles. Murugan's voice through a loudspeaker encourages the people to remain calm and welcome the invading forces, while announcing the formation of the new United Kingdom of Rendang and Pala with himself as the monarch and Colonel Dipa as its prime minister. The caravan stops to execute Dr. Robert and then moves on, Susila horror-stricken, as a myna cries "Attention" one final time.

== Major themes ==
Island explores many of the themes and ideas that interested Huxley in the post-World War II decades and were the subject of many of his nonfiction books of essays, including Brave New World Revisited, Tomorrow and Tomorrow and Tomorrow, The Doors of Perception, and The Perennial Philosophy. Some of these themes and ideas include overpopulation, ecology, modernity, democracy, mysticism, entheogens, and somatotypes.

In an interview with Ron Martinetti of American Legends website, Laura Huxley called Island "the finest and final work." In Laura's opinion, "He put everything in that. Brave New World was a warning and Island was an offering."

Common background elements occur in both Island and Brave New World; they were used for good in the former and for ill in the latter. Such elements include:

Theme comparison
Island	Brave New World
Drug use for enlightenment and social bonding	Drug use for pacification and self-medication
Group living (in the form of Mutual Adoption Clubs) so that children would not have unalloyed exposure to their parents' neuroses	Group living for the elimination of individuality
Trance states for super learning	Trance states for indoctrination
Assisted reproduction (low-tech artificial insemination)	Assisted reproduction (high-tech test-tube babies)
Freely-available contraception to enable reproductive choice, expressive sex	Mandatory contraception, socially encouraged recreational and promiscuous sex
Dangerous climb to a temple, as spiritual preparation	Violent Passion Surrogate
Mynah birds trained to utter uplifting slogans	Ubiquitous disembodied mechanical voices

Huxley's mother Julia Huxley died when he was ten and she was 46. She wrote a letter to Aldous as she was dying and he carried this with him for the rest of his life. It included the thought "Judge not too much and love more". Scholars of Aldous's works see his mother's death in his cynical attitude and his books including Brave New World and the utopian Island.

The culture of Pala is the offspring of a Scottish secular humanist medical doctor, who made a medical visit to the island in the 19th century and decided to stay and work with its Raja, who embodies the island's Mahayana Buddhist tradition, to create a society that merges the best of East and West. The Old Raja's treatise, Notes on What's What, is a book within the book that explains Pala's philosophical foundations.

Elements of L. Ron Hubbard's dianetics also appear in the novel. In her memoir, This Timeless Moment, Laura Huxley writes: "In the first chapter of Island, his novel about a possible Utopia, the hero, shipwrecked and wounded, is found semiconscious by two children, who give him psychological first aid, a basic dianetic technique." Aldous and his first wife, Maria, were enthusiastic adopters of dianetics during the 1950s.

A central element of Palanese society is restrained industrialisation, undertaken with the goal of providing fulfilling work and time for leisure and contemplation. For the Palanese, progress means a selective attitude towards technology, which Huxley contrasts to the underdeveloped poverty of the neighbouring island of Rendang, and with the alienating overdevelopment of the industrialised West, chiefly through Will Farnaby's recollections of London. The Palanese embrace modern science and technology to improve medicine and nutrition, but have rejected widespread industrialisation. For example, hydroelectricity is made available for refrigeration, so that surplus fresh food can be stored, improving nutrition and protecting against food shortages. Huxley viewed this selective modernisation as essential for his "sane" society, even if it means that such a society is unable to militarily defend itself from its "insane" neighbours who wish to steal its natural resources.

The Palanese also circumspectly incorporated the use of "moksha medicine", a fictional entheogen taken ceremonially in rites of passage for mystical and cosmological insight. The moksha mushroom is described as "yellow" and not "those lovely red toadstools", e.g. the Amanita muscaria; this description of the moksha medicine is suggestive of Psilocybe mushrooms, a psychoactive that captivated Huxley during the latter half of his life. The recommended dosage of 400 mg, however, is in the dosage range of mescaline as opposed to psilocybin. Huxley had also been fascinated towards the end of his life by the potential benefit to humanity of substances such as mescaline and LSD. Brave New World and most of Huxley's other books were written before he first tried a psychedelic drug in 1953.

Many of the ideas used to describe Pala as a utopia in Island appear also in Brave New World Revisited's last chapter, which aims to propose actions which could be taken to prevent a democracy from turning into a totalitarian world like the one described in Brave New World.

Huxley used a scene of two mantids (Gongylus gongyloides) mating to make philosophical observations about the nature of death. In another memorable scene, Will Farnaby watches a Palanese version of Oedipus Rex with a little girl. Will points out that in his version Oedipus pokes his eyes out. The girl replies that that is silly, since all the king had to do was stop being married to his mother.

== References to Indian religions ==
- The cosmic dance of Shiva (Nataraja)
- The legend of Muchalinda
- Buddha's Flower Sermon
- Moksha

== See also ==
- Utopia
- Oneida Community
- Zihuatanejo Project
