= Walter Pahnke =

American physician and psychiatrist (1931–1971)

- Born: January 18, 1931
- Died: July 10, 1971 (aged 40)
- Known for: Work with psychedelic drugs, Marsh Chapel Experiment (Good Friday Experiment)

Walter Norman Pahnke (January 18, 1931 – July 10, 1971) was a minister, physician, and psychiatrist most famous for the "Good Friday Experiment", also referred to as the Marsh Chapel Experiment or the "Miracle of Marsh Chapel".

Pahnke attended Harvard in the early 1960s. He earned an MD from Harvard Medical School, a BD (now M.Div.) from Harvard Divinity School, a Ph.D. from Harvard Graduate School of Arts and Sciences, and a Harvard psychiatric residency. He was a psychedelic researcher at Harvard University.

In 1967, Pahnke joined the Maryland Psychiatric Research Center in Spring Grove, Maryland. He conducted psychedelic therapy sessions using lysergic acid diethylamide (LSD) and dipropyltryptamine (DPT), with terminal cancer patients as well as people suffering from alcoholism and severe neurosis. There he worked with therapists Stanislav Grof, Bill Richards, and Richard Yensen, among others. Pahnke served as director of the project from 1967 until 1971, when he died in a scuba diving accident in Maine.

== Good Friday Experiment ==
On April 20, 1962, Pahnke conducted the "Good Friday Experiment" as part of his Ph.D. thesis in Religion and Society under his thesis advisors Timothy Leary and Richard Alpert. In this experiment, ten students from Andover Newton Theological School were given 30 mg psilocybin and ten were given an active placebo (niacin - vitamin B_{3}) in a religious setting (a Good Friday service) to see whether entheogens could help facilitate a genuine religious experience. Nine out of ten of the students reported religious or mystical experiences while only one of ten in the placebo group reported the same. Among those who participated in the study were Leary and Huston Smith, professor of philosophy at MIT and respected religious scholar. Later follow-up studies confirmed the results and the thesis that primary religious experiences could be occasioned by using psychedelic drugs in a religious setting.

== Publications ==
- Drugs and Mysticism [PhD thesis] (1966)
- Drugs and Mysticism (1966)
- Implications of LSD and Experimental Mysticism (1966)
- LSD and Religious Experience (1967)
- The Psychedelic Mystical Experience in the Human Encounter With Death (1971)
- The Use of Music in Psychedelic (LSD) Psychotherapy (1972), with Helen Bonny
