= Zihuatanejo Project =

Psychedelic training center and intentional community

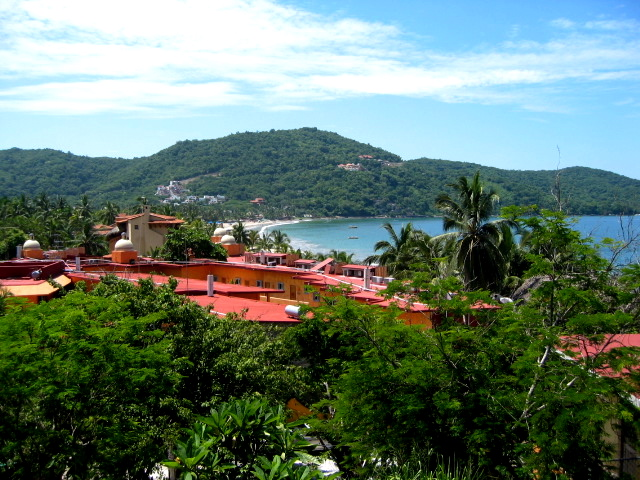
Playa La Ropa near the site of the Zihuatanejo Project

The Zihuatanejo Project was a psychedelic training center and intentional community created during the beginning of the counterculture of the 1960s by Timothy Leary and Richard Alpert under the umbrella of their nonprofit group, the International Federation for Internal Freedom (IFIF). The community was located in Zihuatanejo, Guerrero, Mexico, and took up residence at the Hotel Catalina in the summers of 1962 and 1963.

== Background ==
Leary and Alpert first discovered the town of Zihuatanejo in 1960. After the Marsh Chapel Experiment in 1962 they decided the area would make a good location for a training center. The idea for the community was influenced by Aldous Huxley's fictional novel, Island (1962).

== Training program ==
Thousands of people applied to the IFIF in the hopes of joining the project in Zihuatanejo. Out of this pool of applicants, a small, select group of people were chosen. Amenities cost $200 a month per person, including food and lodging in bungalows near a secluded beach. Fishermen supplied a bounty of fresh fish from the bay. During the first training session in 1962, Leary and 35 guests rented the Catalina Hotel for a month using their own version of the Tibetan Book of the Dead as a guide book for LSD sessions; Ralph Metzner and Richard Alpert helped manage the group. Group LSD sessions began in the morning with the consumption of liquid LSD, with a dosage of 100 to 500 micrograms ingested by participating individuals; the experience would usually last until late afternoon.

== Closure ==
Immigration officials were tipped off to the project when the Mexican media began reporting stories about an "LSD Paradise". In the summer of 1963, after only six weeks (May 1 - June 16), the Mexican authorities shut the community down. Officials removed the group from Zihuatanejo and sent them to Mexico City aboard a chartered DC-3. Several failed attempts were made to move the training center to Dominica and Antigua. In August 1963, with the help of wealthy patrons, Leary and their group moved to the Hitchcock Estate in Millbrook, New York, where they stayed until 1968.

== Media ==
Leary talks extensively about the project on the 1966 recording, Turn On, Tune In, Drop Out: Timothy Leary Ph.D. speaks on L.S.D.
