= Mestre Gabriel =

Brazilian spiritual leader (1922–1971)

José Gabriel da Costa, later known as Mestre Gabriel, (1922–1971), is the founder of the União do Vegetal, a religion with Christian and reincarnationist foundations that considers Hoasca (more commonly referred to as "ayahuasca") to be its main sacrament. This beverage is made by boiling two plants, Mariri (Banisteriopsis caapi) and Chacrona (Psychotria viridis), both of which are found in the Amazon rainforest.

Mestre Gabriel was born on 10 February in Coração de Maria, in the state of Bahia, Brazil. He received minimal education and moved to Acre, Brazil, later becoming a rubber tapper in the Amazon region. It was through his work as a rubber tapper that Mestre Gabriel first encountered Hoasca; receiving what he believed to be revelations, he created the UDV on 22 July 1961, on the border between Brazil and Bolivia, organizing a coherent belief system and gathering the first few followers.

After some years Mestre Gabriel left the forest and moved with his family to Porto Velho, the capital of the Guaporé territory (which would later become the state of Rondônia, Brazil) easing access to and expansion of the UDV. There the religious institution was formally registered on 1 November 1967. Mestre Gabriel died on 24 September 1971, in Brasília, DF. By then he had already prepared a group of disciples who united, carry on and distribute the spiritual knowledge taught by Mestre Gabriel. Today the UDV has spread through the Brazilian Amazon and urban areas of the country, being present in all Brazilian capitals. The UDV is also present in numerous other countries, including the US, Canada, England, Spain, Portugal, Italy, Switzerland, the Netherlands, and Australia.
