= Ammon Hillman =

American classicist

- Born: 1971 (age 54–55); Tucson, Arizona, U.S.
- Education: University of Arizona (BA) University of Wisconsin-Madison (PhD, BA)
- Occupations: Professor; author; biblical commentator
- Notable work: The Chemical Muse

YouTube information
- Channel: Lady Babylon
- Years active: 2022–present
- Genre: Biblical commentary
- Subscribers: 45 thousand
- Views: 3.2 million
- Last updated: December 23, 2024

David Charles Ammon Hillman (born 1971) is an American classicist, known for his re-interpreting of Christianity. He was an adjunct professor at Saint Mary's University of Minnesota, before his firing over allegations of sexual misconduct after translating a production of Medea that the school's faculty found unsettling. In May 2024, he appeared on the Danny Jones Podcast, making his views on Christianity, Ancient Greek and Roman pharmacy, and the life of Jesus more widely known. The podcast has since amassed over 3.2 million views on YouTube.

== Early life ==
David Charles Ammon Hillman was born to Baptist parents in Tucson, Arizona. By the time Hillman was 17, he was teaching Sunday school and preaching at a mission, as well as studying Koine Greek and Latin. He completed an undergraduate degree in classics at the University of Arizona, and spent three months at the Dallas Theological Seminary. His exposure to classical authors such as Aristotle led him to becoming an apostate. He later pursued a master's degree in animal science, but abandoned it.

Hillman then went on to attend the University of Wisconsin–Madison, earning a master's degree in bacteriology, as well as a Ph.D. in classics with a specialization in Ancient Greek and Roman pharmacy. During this period, he spent a lot of time going over medical texts in Latin and Greek, coming across evidence that the Greeks knew about herbal concoctions such as opium, and that they used these substances recreationally.

== Career ==
=== 2008–2015: Career beginnings and firing from St. Mary's University of Minnesota ===
While writing his classics dissertation at UW–Madison, Hillman was forced by his "overly conservative" advisors to delete an entire chapter he wrote on the widespread recreational drug use in the ancient world. This event inspired him to write his first book, The Chemical Muse: Drug Use and the Roots of Western Civilization in 2008. The book describes how Ancient Greeks and Romans used herbal substances for healing and creative purposes.

Hillman began teaching as an adjunct professor at Saint Mary's University of Minnesota. In the autumn of 2015, he was hired by the university's theater professor, Judy Myers, to write an original translation of the Ancient Greek tragedy Medea. In the production, which Hillman described as "authentic" and written to "maintain the historical integrity of the play," phallic ancient world objects known as fascina were used as props by cast members. The school's administrators found the play's message, as well as the use of the fascina, uncomfortable, banning the use of the objects as well as later terminating Hillman from his position entirely. Many students, as well as fellow professors, protested the firing, claiming that the school was actively censoring Hillman's freedom of speech.

=== 2024: Danny Jones Podcast ===
Hillman appeared on the Danny Jones Podcast on May 20, 2024, discussing his views on Christianity and the life of Jesus. He asserted that the Septuagint was not a translation, but indeed the true original source of the Bible, and was mistranslated into the Hebrew language. Hillman claimed that, using his extensive knowledge of the Ancient Greek language and pharmaceutical terms, the New Testament actually reveals that the Twelve Apostles were all prepubescent teenagers, and that Jesus was trafficking them for ritualistic and drug-related purposes. A particular occurrence he finds interest in is within the Gospel of Mark, where it is described that a naked youth, seemingly wearing nothing but a linen garment, is seen running away from the site of Jesus' arrest in the Garden of Gethsemane. Hillman claims that what the Ancient Greek actually describes is that the naked youth was not wearing a linen garment, but instead a medicated bandage around his penis, from where Jesus was extracting an antidote to the Dipsas venom he had taken recreationally. He further claims that Jesus actually died of an overdose of this venom during his crucifixion, as the antidote was insufficient to save his life.

== Personal life ==
Hillman is a single father to two children.

== Bibliography ==
- The Chemical Muse: Drug Use and the Roots of Western Civilization (Macmillan, 2008) ISBN 0-312-35249-2
- Original Sin: Sex, Drugs, and the Church (Ronin Publishing, 2012) ISBN 1-57951-165-1
- Hermaphrodites, Gynomorphs and Jesus: She-Male Gods and the Roots of Christianity (Ronin Publishing, 2014) ISBN 1-57951-185-6
