= Marsh Chapel Experiment =

1962 psychological research study on religious experiences of psilocybin users

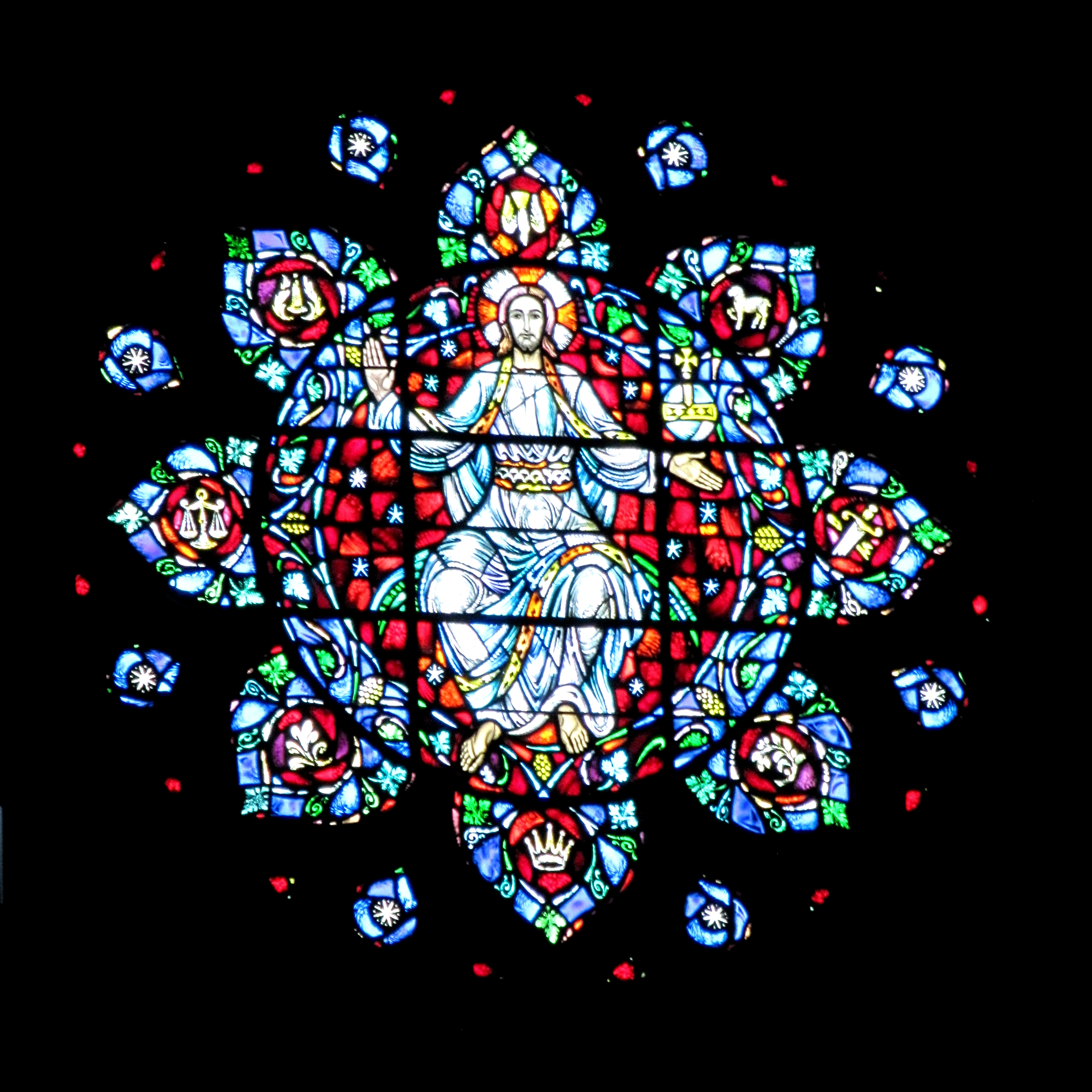
The rose window above the altar at Boston University's Marsh Chapel

The Marsh Chapel Experiment, also called the "Good Friday Experiment", was an experiment conducted on Good Friday, April 20, 1962 at Boston University's Marsh Chapel. Walter N. Pahnke, a graduate student in theology at Harvard Divinity School, designed the experiment under the supervision of Timothy Leary, Richard Alpert, and the Harvard Psilocybin Project. Pahnke's experiment investigated whether psilocybin would act as a reliable entheogen in religiously predisposed subjects.

== Experiment ==
Prior to the Good Friday service, twenty graduate degree divinity student volunteers from the Boston area were randomly divided into two groups. In a double-blind experiment, half of the students received psilocybin, while a control group received a large dose of niacin. Niacin produces clear physiological changes and thus was used as an active placebo. In at least some cases, those who received the niacin initially believed they had received the psychoactive drug. However, the feeling of face flushing (turning red, feeling hot and tingly) produced by niacin subsided about an hour after receiving the dose, whereas the effects of the psilocybin intensified over the first few hours.

Almost all of the members of the experimental group reported experiencing profound religious experiences, providing empirical support for the notion that psychedelic drugs can facilitate religious experiences. Religious scholar Huston Smith, who later wrote several textbooks on comparative religion, was a participant; he later described his experience as "the most powerful cosmic homecoming I have ever experienced".

Another participant was Paul Lee, who was Paul Tillich's teaching assistant at Harvard Divinity School and one of the founding editors of the Psychedelic Review (along with much of the original cast of the Psilocybin Project). Lee was given the niacin, at least for these sessions. Amidst other intriguing journal observations, in the entry titled "The Mushroom" Lee recounted,

I had the feeling finally that Ralph [Metzner] was exceedingly aware of what was going on and didn't know what to do about it, except be somewhat embarrassed. Under the influence of the drug such interpersonal dynamics are transparently obvious and cannot help but be noticed and acknowledged. I again had the impression of the room being a vast sensorium, where all nuance and subtleties are vividly and emphatically experienced!

One's intuitive powers are increased dramatically, which leads to qualities of understanding and communion and affection. I responded profoundly to this character of the experience. During the last hour it seemed as if we reached a kind of easy plateau where we all sat around and chatted. The group dynamics were beautiful. I thought that we all shared this power and could utilize or give expression to as much as we wanted. It was during this time that Michael tried to take a directing hand in things and I contested him and oer' leapt him. It was like an exercise in power gymnastics and I enjoyed the dynamics of it immensely, repeating such words as wonderful beautiful in order to express my enjoyment and appreciation. Ernie kept repeating phrases that we outlawed which was funny. I again had a tremendous amount of sinus drainage, almost more than the previous time—although there was nothing revelatory about it....

— Jennifer Ulrich, The Timothy Leary Project, Paul Lee Trip Report Entitled The Mushroom | February 26, 1962

Timothy Leary, who had supervised the experiment without institutional approval, was dismissed from Harvard in 1963.

== Doblin's follow-up ==
In a 25-year follow-up to the experiment in 1986, all of the subjects given psilocybin except for one described their experience as having elements of "a genuine mystical nature and characterized it as one of the high points of their spiritual life". Psychedelic researcher Rick Doblin considered Pahnke's original study partially flawed due to incorrect implementation of the double-blind procedure, and several imprecise questions in the mystical experience questionnaire. Pahnke had failed to mention that several subjects had struggled with acute anxiety during their experience. One had to be restrained and injected with Thorazine (chlorpromazine) after he had fled the chapel convinced he was chosen to announce the return of the Messiah. Nevertheless, Doblin said that Pahnke's study cast "a considerable doubt on the assertion that mystical experiences catalyzed by drugs are in any way inferior to non-drug mystical experiences in both their immediate content and long-term effects". A similar sentiment was expressed by clinical psychologist William A. Richards, who in 2007 stated "[psychedelic] mushroom use may constitute one technology for evoking revelatory experiences that are similar, if not identical, to those that occur through so-called spontaneous alterations of brain chemistry."

== Griffiths' study ==
In 2002 (published in 2006), a study was conducted at Johns Hopkins University by Roland R. Griffiths that assessed mystical experience after psilocybin. In a 14-month follow-up to this study, over half of the participants rated the experience among the top five most meaningful spiritual experiences in their lives, and considered the experience to have increased their personal well-being and life satisfaction.

== See also ==
- Concord Prison Experiment
- God helmet
- Neuroscience of religion
