= União do Vegetal =

Brazilian religious society

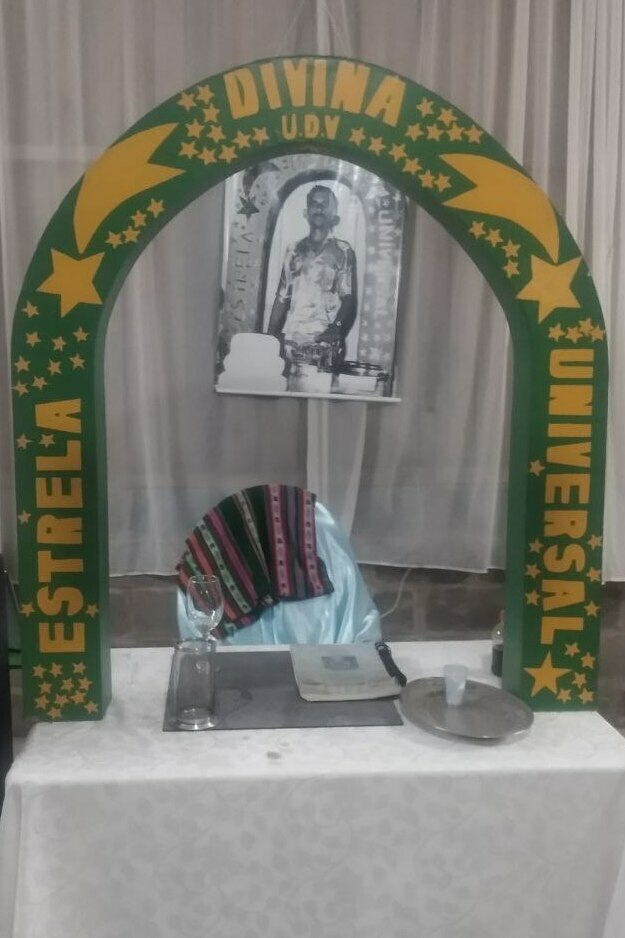
- Altar used in UDV ceremonies, with a photograph of founder Mestre Gabriel
- Formation: 1961
- Type: Syncretism
- Headquarters: Brasília, Brazil
- Official language: Portuguese
- Website: udv.org.br

The União do Vegetal (UDV), also known as Centro Espírita Beneficente União do Vegetal and in English as the Union of the Plant, is a syncretistic religious society founded in 1961 in the Brazilian city of Porto Velho by José Gabriel da Costa, known as Mestre Gabriel. The term vegetal in its name refers to the psychoactive brew ayahuasca, known as hoasca in Brazil. This is prepared by boiling two plants in water, mariri (Banisteriopsis caapi) and chacrona (Psychotria viridis), both of which are native to the Amazon rainforest. Ayahuasca has been fully legal in Brazil since 1992.

== U.S. Supreme Court case ==
In 1999, U. S. Customs agents seized over 30 U.S. gallons (110 liters) of ayahuasca, which had been shipped to the Santa Fe, New Mexico branch of UDV. While no charges were filed, the UDV filed suit in 2000, claiming that the seizure was an illegal violation of the church members' rights and seeking a preliminary injunction preventing the US federal government from barring the group's use of ayahuasca. In 2002, U.S. District Chief Judge James Aubrey Parker granted the church's motion. In 2006, the United States Supreme Court unanimously delivered judgment in favor of the church.

== See also ==
- Psychedelic church
- Santo Daime
