= How to Change Your Mind (miniseries) =

2022 Netflix docuseries

- Genre: Documentary
- Based on: How to Change Your Mind by Michael Pollan
- Directed by: Lucy Walker; Alison Ellwood
- Presented by: Michael Pollan
- Composer: Justin Melland
- Country of origin: United States
- Original language: English
- No. of episodes: 4

Production
- Executive producers: Alex Gibney; Michael Pollan; Lucy Walker; Stacey Offman; Richard Perello
- Producers: Alison Ellwood; Tahria Sheather
- Cinematography: Pablo Berron
- Running time: 51–55 minutes
- Production companies: Jigsaw Productions; Tree Tree Tree

Original release
- Network: Netflix
- Release: July 12, 2022

How to Change Your Mind is a 2022 American docuseries based on the book of the same name by Michael Pollan. It consists of four episodes, which were released on July 12, 2022, on Netflix and give insights into the psychedelic drugs LSD, psilocybin, MDMA and mescaline as well as their uses in psychedelic therapy. The series has been dubbed into Spanish, Hindi, Portuguese, French, Russian, German, Italian, Polish, Czech, and Hungarian.

== Background ==
Michael Pollan published his book How to Change Your Mind in 2018. He serves as a presenter and guide throughout the miniseries.

On June 16, 2022, Netflix first published a trailer for the series and announced that Lucy Walker and Alison Ellwood would be directing, while Alex Gibney would serve as executive producer. Gibney expressed his pleasure working on the project, adding "It’s so important—a revelation about how some hallucinogens, once vilified, can lead to mindfulness. New science shows that these drugs can save lives and change our minds, helping us to live better lives."

According to director Alison Ellwood, the series tries to omit "psychedelic visual tropes—wild colors, rainbow streaks, morphing images" to make it relatable to people who have not had psychedelic experiences.

== Episodes ==
No.	Title	Directed by	Original release date
1	"LSD"	Lucy Walker	July 12, 2022
The series' premiere episode about lysergic acid diethylamide (LSD) focuses on topics like the first synthesis of the drug in 1938, Bicycle Day, the Harvard Psilocybin Project, Project MKUltra, Acid Tests, as well as psychedelic microdosing and psychedelic therapy. It features interviews with Albert Hofmann, Humphry Osmond, Timothy Leary, James Fadiman, Richard Alpert and Ken Kesey, among others.
2	"Psilocybin"	Lucy Walker & Alison Ellwood	July 12, 2022
Topics touched on in the episode on psilocybin and psilocybin mushrooms include psilocybin therapy, curanderos, the Seeking the Magic Mushroom article, the Spring Grove Experiment, scholarly approaches to mysticism, as well as the legal status of psilocybin mushrooms and ego death. Interviewees include María Sabina, R. Gordon Wasson, Albert Hofmann, Timothy Leary, William Richards, Paul Stamets and Roland Griffiths.
3	"MDMA"	Alison Ellwood & Lucy Walker	July 12, 2022
3,4-Methylenedioxymethamphetamine (MDMA) or "ecstasy" is the drug of focus for this episode, with a particular emphasis being placed on themes such as MDMA-assisted psychotherapy (including psychedelic treatments for trauma-related disorders), the Multidisciplinary Association for Psychedelic Studies, as well as raves and the Second Summer of Love. Some of the prominent figures being interviewed in this episode are Ann and Alexander Shulgin, Ben Sessa and Rick Doblin.
4	"Mescaline"	Alison Ellwood & Lucy Walker	July 12, 2022
The final episode about mescaline gives insights into peyote and the peyote ceremony as administered by indigenous Americans, such as adherents of the Native American Church, as well as into the "Decriminalize Nature" movement. It mentions Echinopsis pachanoi, and the Eleusinian Mysteries. Some of the interviewees are Alfred Leo Smith, Aldous Huxley, Humphry Osmond and Timothy Leary.

== Reception ==
=== Critical response ===
On Rotten Tomatoes, the miniseries holds an approval rating of 100% based on 9 reviews, with an average rating of 7.40/10. Stuart Heritage of The Guardian called the miniseries "hugely eloquent and convincing". Natalia Winkelman of The Boston Globe criticized the series for being too one-sided and failing to adequately address adverse effects of psychedelics. San Francisco Chronicle critic Bob Strauss found the series "not comprehensive, but packed with interesting tidbits" and says it provided "multiple worthy views that can be mind-blowing."

== See also ==
- How to Change Your Mind (2018 book)
- List of psychedelic documentaries
