= Phil Wolfson =

American psychiatrist

Philip E. Wolfson
- Born: 1943 (age 82–83)
- Citizenship: United States
- Education: New York University School of Medicine, MD
- Organizations: Ketamine Research Foundation; Center For Transformational Psychotherapy
- Known for: Psychedelic psychotherapy, Ketamine-assisted psychotherapy, Consciousness, Spirituality, Social Justice activism
- Website: philwolfsonmd.com

Philip E. Wolfson (born 1943) is a psychiatrist and psychotherapist known for his work in psychedelic medicine, particularly in treating mental health conditions such as depression, anxiety, and post-traumatic stress disorder (PTSD). He has been credited as a pioneer in ketamine-assisted psychotherapy KAP and has worked in the areas of MDMA-assisted psychotherapy and psychedelic-assisted therapies.

Wolfson has also written on secular Buddhism and its relationship to psychotherapy, particularly in relation to consciousness, suffering, compassion, and spiritual awareness in clinical practice.

== Career ==
Wolfson began working as a psychiatrist in the Washington, D.C. area in 1971, attending programs at the Washington School of Psychiatry, including three years of group therapy training. He was also involved in community mental health and family- and systems-based therapeutic work during this period.

In 1977, he joined the Woodburn Mental Health Center in Annandale, Virginia as a psychiatrist. In 1981, he became the Director of I Ward in the Contra Costa County Hospital's Mental Health System where he was involved in alternative psychiatric treatment models that emphasized reduced medication use and intensive therapeutic work. He has maintained a private psychiatric and psychotherapy practice in the San Francisco Bay Area since the early 1980s.

Wolfson was a member of the psychiatric staff at Sequoia Hospital from 1988 to 1995 and served as Assistant Clinical Professor of Psychiatry at the University of California, San Francisco (UCSF) School of Medicine from 1986 to 2009. He has taught at the California Institute of Integral Studies and John F. Kennedy University.

He has also been involved in biotechnology and medical businesses, including roles as founder and director of Fiberstars, Inc. (later Energy Focus, Inc.) and Neurobiological Technologies, Inc., as President and CEO of Phytos, Inc., and as Founder and Medical Director of Progressive Therapeutics, Inc. He holds multiple patents.

In 2011, Wolfson published his memoir, "Noe: A Father's Memoir of Loss" about the death of his son and reflects on the process of healing and transformation through grief.

=== Psychedelic psychotherapy ===
In 2014, Wolfson opened a clinic in Marin County, dedicated to the application of ketamine-assisted psychotherapy (KAP). He founded in 2017 the non-profit organization Ketamine Research Foundation (KRF).

Wolfson was also involved in research and advocacy on MDMA-assisted psycotherapy in therapeutic settings to treat trauma and PTSD, emphasizing the importance of rigorous scientific studies to validate its efficacy and safety. Wolfson collaborates with the Multidisciplinary Association for Psychedelic Studies on MDMA and ketamine research.

He published several studies related to the practice of ketamine-assisted psychotherapy, where he tends to emphasize the dissociative-psychedelic effects of the medicine as primary and inseparable effects, instead of "side effects."

=== Guidelines and Clinical Standards ===
In 2025, Wolfson co-authored the Guidelines for the Personal Use and the Clinical Administration of Ketamine: Safety and Standard of Care, published by the Ketamine Research Foundation. The guidelines address clinical frameworks, safety protocols, and harm reduction. They also describe a model called the K-12 Path for Prevention and Recovery, focused on approaches to ketamine dependency and recovery.

=== Ketamine therapy for minors ===
In 2023, Wolfson published the first paper on working with adolescents and ketamine. He also conducted research on the concentration of ketamine in breast milk enabling women to make a decision to use this medicine for treatment of depression and postpartum depression with minimal disruption of the mother-child relationship.

=== Research ===
Wolfson has authored and co-authored peer-reviewed articles on ketamine-assisted psychotherapy, MDMA-assisted therapy, and related subjects, published in journals including Frontiers in Psychiatry, Journal of Psychoactive Drugs, and Scientific Reports.

His research has covered ketamine therapy outcomes, pharmacokinetics of ketamine in lactating women, MDMA-assisted therapy for anxiety related to life-threatening illness, and the use of ketamine-assisted psychotherapy in adolescents.

== Selected publications ==
- Wolfson, Phil; Hartelius, Glenn (2022). The Ketamine Papers: Science, Therapy, and Transformation. Santa Cruz, CA: Multidisciplinary Association for Psychedelic Studies. ISBN 978-0-9982765-0-2.
- Wolfson, Phil et al. (2020). "MDMA-assisted psychotherapy for anxiety related to life-threatening illness". Scientific Reports. ISSN 2045-2322
- Wolfson, Phil et al. (2019). "Ketamine Assisted Psychotherapy (KAP): Patient Demographics, Diagnoses and Response to Treatment". Journal of Psychoactive Drugs. PMID 30917760
- Wolfson, Philip E.; Andries, Julane; Ahlers, Daniel; Whippo, Melissa (2023). "Ketamine-assisted psychotherapy in adolescents with multiple psychiatric diagnoses". Frontiers in Psychiatry.PMID 37065886
- Wolfson, Phil (2025). Guidelines For The Personal Use and The Clinical Administration of Ketamine: Safety and Standard of Care. ASIN B0DXKW6KYX.
