= Rick Doblin =

American drug activist

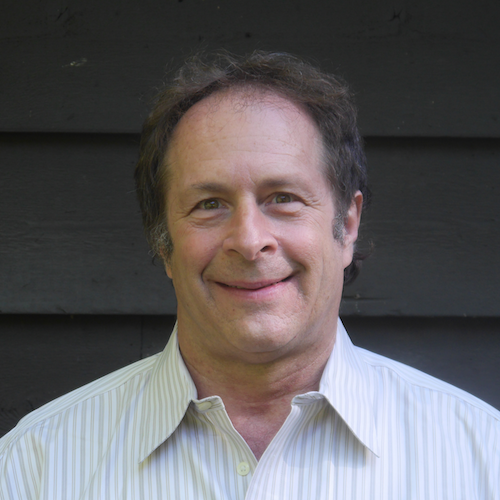
- Doblin, 2014
- Born: November 30, 1953 (age 72); Chicago, Illinois, US
- Education: New College of Florida (BSc, 1987); Harvard University (PhD, 2001)
- Occupation: Founder and Executive Director, Multidisciplinary Association for Psychedelic Studies (MAPS)
- Known for: Psychedelic therapy, MAPS
- Scientific career
- Fields: Psychology, Public policy, Political science
- Thesis: Regulation of the medical use of psychedelics and marijuana; (2000)
- Doctoral advisor: Frederic M. Scherer

Richard Elliot Doblin (born November 30, 1953) is an American psychedelic drug advocate who is the founder and president of the Multidisciplinary Association for Psychedelic Studies (MAPS).

== Early life and education ==
Rick Doblin grew up in Skokie, Illinois as the oldest of four children in a Jewish family. He first enrolled in Florida's New College (now New College of Florida) in 1971, but dropped out after one semester, later re-enrolling and completing a bachelor's in psychology. Doblin later went on to get his doctorate in public policy at Harvard's Kennedy School of Government, graduating in 2001. Doblin's PhD thesis is titled Regulation of the Medical Use of Psychedelics and Marijuana, and was published in June 2000.

== Multidisciplinary Association for Psychedelic Studies ==
Doblin established MAPS in 1986 to research MDMA and other psychedelics through legal clinical trials. MAPS pursued a lengthy FDA approval process, hoping mainstream acceptance of MDMA therapy could positively impact access to other treatments. Over decades, MAPS collaborated with scientists, raised funds through philanthropic means, and worked to change public perceptions of psychedelics.

In January 2023, Doblin quietly transitioned from executive director of MAPS to president of the organization. Kris Lotlikar replaced Doblin as executive director.

=== MAPS assault allegation ===
In 2015, during a MAPS-sponsored Phase 2 clinical trial of MDMA-assisted psychotherapy for post-traumatic stress disorder (PTSD) in British Columbia, Canada, participant Meaghan Buisson reported experiencing unethical conduct by her therapists, Dr. Richard Yensen and Dr. Donna Dryer. While under the influence of MDMA, Buisson was videotaped in prolonged physical contact with Yensen, including being held, spooned, and kissed during and after sessions. After the trial, she was drawn into what she later described as a manipulative and emotionally abusive sexual relationship with Yensen, despite her vulnerable psychological state and prior history of sexual trauma.

Although Buisson submitted a formal complaint to MAPS in 2018 and provided extensive documentation, including video evidence from trial sessions, the organization did not fully review all materials until years later. Four years after the complaint, as director of MAPS, Doblin justified this inaction by stating: "This unethical sexual misconduct happened after the therapy was over… So that made us think that we didn’t need to review the video."

In 2019, MAPS publicly acknowledged that ethical boundaries had been violated and formally severed ties with both therapists. The case drew widespread condemnation from mental health professionals and triggered new protocols within the organization, including the introduction of stricter consent and oversight procedures. Nevertheless, many critics argued that MAPS’ delayed response reflected broader institutional failings, including a lack of trauma-informed practices, inadequate therapist supervision, and the prioritization of organizational reputation over participant safety.

== FDA rejection of MDMA therapy ==
On June 4, 2024, an independent advisory panel to the U.S. Food and Drug Administration (FDA) voted against recommending approval of MDMA-assisted therapy for post-traumatic stress disorder (PTSD). The panel reviewed evidence from two Phase 3 clinical trials submitted by Lykos Therapeutics, the MAPS-affiliated company conducting the studies. While some panel members acknowledged the potential promise of MDMA therapy, the majority expressed concerns about data reliability, insufficient safety protocols, and the lack of long-term follow-up data.

Specific criticisms included the unblinded nature of the trials, reliance on therapists trained internally by MAPS, and the absence of diverse participant samples. The panel also noted a significant placebo effect and questioned whether the results could be generalized beyond the controlled study setting. Several members emphasized the need for independent replication of findings before MDMA could be considered for approval.

During the open public hearing portion of the meeting, over 30 speakers shared comments. Several speakers, including scientists, bioethicists, and trauma survivors, voiced concerns about the influence of MAPS and Rick Doblin on the trial process. Some questioned whether Doblin's idealistic framing could overshadow important safety and ethical concerns.

In the wake of the FDA advisory panel’s rejection of MDMA-assisted therapy and the subsequent retractions of key research articles, Lykos Therapeutics (formerly MAPS Public Benefit Corporation) underwent significant structural changes. In August 2024, the company announced it was laying off approximately 75% of its workforce, affecting roughly 100 employees. The layoffs were attributed to shifting regulatory expectations, reduced funding prospects, and the need to restructure operations following the FDA decision.

== Retraction of research papers ==
In August 2024, the journal *Psychopharmacology* formally retracted three research papers authored by MAPS-affiliated scientists on MDMA-assisted psychotherapy for PTSD. The retractions followed mounting concerns about the integrity of clinical trial oversight, incomplete reporting of adverse events, and ethical violations involving therapists in MAPS-sponsored studies. The studies in question had played a central role in advocating for FDA approval and public support of MDMA therapy.

According to the publisher’s retraction notice, key disclosures were omitted from the original submissions, including the failure to report known misconduct by trial therapists and the lack of independent safety monitoring. The decision to retract the studies came after months of internal review, as well as public pressure following investigative reports and the FDA advisory panel's rejection of the therapy.

== Advocacy for psychedelics as secular spiritual tools and conduit to world peace ==
Doblin has long advocated for the potential of psychedelics to serve as tools for secular spirituality. Doblin envisions psychedelics, particularly MDMA and psilocybin, as agents for profound mystical experiences that could offer a substitute for traditional religious practices. He has suggested that such experiences could lead to what he calls a "spiritualized humanity", where global peace and interconnectedness are achieved through shared psychedelic experiences.

This view has generated both support and controversy. Proponents argue that psychedelics offer an alternative path to spiritual awakening and social cohesion, particularly in a secular, post-religious world. However, critics contend that Doblin's framing of psychedelics as a tool for spiritual enlightenment may compromise the objectivity required in psychedelic research. These critics suggest that such advocacy could blur the lines between scientific inquiry and personal ideology, thus introducing biases that may influence clinical research and public policy.

The discussion became more contentious during the 2024 FDA advisory panel hearing, where several public commentators raised concerns about cult-like dynamics within MAPS. One critic, Brian Pace, a lecturer at Ohio State University, publicly criticized Doblin's vision of using psychedelics to bring about world peace, describing it as part of a "therapy cult". Some researchers and advocates within the psychedelic community also worry that the close alignment of MAPS with both research and advocacy could compromise scientific integrity by promoting a specific worldview under the guise of objective therapeutic development.

At the same time, supporters of psychedelic therapy stress that recent controversies should not overshadow the potential therapeutic value of these substances when administered under appropriate conditions. Many call for a reorientation toward slower, more transparent, and community-driven development models—emphasizing harm reduction, diverse leadership, and public accountability as essential principles for the field’s future.

The unfolding debate suggests that the future of psychedelic medicine will depend not only on clinical trial results, but also on how researchers, practitioners, companies, and communities navigate the ethical and institutional challenges that accompany rapid growth and mainstream acceptance.

== See also ==
- Lykos Therapeutics
- Psychedelia
- What a Trip: The Rick Doblin Story
