= Psymposia =

Non-profit media organization and self described watchdog Journalism

- Formation: 2014; 12 years ago
- Founders: Brian Normand; Brett Greene
- Type: Not-for-profit organization
- Tax ID no.: 85-0630940
- Key people: Brian Normand; Brett Greene; Russell Hausfeld; Neşe Devenot; Brian Pace; David Nickles (2020-2023); Lily Kay Ross (2020-2023)
- Website: psymposia.com

Psymposia is a small not-for-profit organization, media organization, and self-described "watchdog group" reporting on the psychedelic community and focusing on harm reduction. The group was founded in 2014 and became a nonprofit in 2020. Psymposia is leftist and anti-capitalist. They do work within a discipline that they have referred to as "critical psychedelic studies" (as in critical theory).

The group's work has been both praised and criticized. They have become increasingly controversial over time due to claims against them of false accusations, aggressive tactics, and politically motivated campaigning against approval of MDMA-assisted psychotherapy. These claims have also been denied and disputed by the group and certain other authors. The group is said to have been excluded from the mainstream psychedelic community and banned from conferences. In July 2025, Susie Sarlo disclosed that she donated US$185,000 to Psymposia in 2024 through the Sarlo Foundation. She holds negative views about MDMA and its developer the Multidisciplinary Association for Psychedelic Studies (MAPS) because she claims a MAPS board member abused and exploited her father, George Sarlo.

== Members ==
Psymposia's members have included co-founders Brian Normand and Brett Greene, journalist Russell Hausfeld, academics Neşe Devenot and Brian Pace, self-described "underground researcher" and anarchist David Nickles (legal name David Maliken; not to be confused with psychedelic chemist David E. Nichols), and feminist scholar Lily Kay Ross, among others. As of February 2025, Devenot is said to be the group's most high-profile member. They are a senior lecturer at the writing program at Johns Hopkins University and are described as a researcher in the area of psychedelic bioethics. Oriana Mayorga was Psymposia's former community engagement director. Nickles and Ross eventually left Psymposia and started their own group. Psymposia co-founder Greene is no longer a member as well. He is notable in also being the co-founder of the for-profit psychedelic pharmaceutical company Adelia Therapeutics, which was acquired by Cybin in 2020, and in then serving as Cybin's Chief Innovation Officer.

== Work and views ==
Psymposia has been widely credited with examining sexual abuse in the field of psychedelics, particularly in underground settings. Psymposia also provided reporting on major patent disputes in the psychedelic industry, and identified a number of early business strategies utilized by psychedelic companies such as reverse takeovers of publicly listed mining companies. Greene has been partially credited with coining the term "corporadelic" in 2019 to refer to corporations commodifying and profiting off of psychedelics, which the group strongly opposes. Psymposia advocates for the decriminalization and legalization of psychedelics.

In 2021 and 2022, New York Magazine published an investigative podcast series and collaboration with Psymposia called Cover Story: Power Trip. It was co-created and co-produced by Psymposia members Ross and Nickles. The podcast discussed a variety of concerns about the underground psychedelic industry, as well as issues within the clinical trials of MDMA-assisted psychotherapy (MDMA-AT) for treatment of post-traumatic stress disorder (PTSD) being sponsored by the Multidisciplinary Association for Psychedelic Studies (MAPS) and Lykos Therapeutics.

As an example, Cover Story: Power Trip reported on Meaghan Buisson, a MAPS trial participant who was subject to unethical behavior and inappropriate physical contact by her therapists while participating in the studies. Cover Story: Power Trip and Buisson opted to publish video excerpts of one of her clinical trial sessions in March 2022, documenting that the husband-and-wife therapist team had cuddled and spooned her. Buisson subsequently lived with the couple, Dr. Donna Dryer and Dr. Richard Yensen, on a remote Canadian island, and eventually entered a sexual relationship with Yensen, allegedly under the guise of further therapy for her PTSD. In 2018, Buisson filed a civil suit alleging repeated sexual assault by Yensen. The case was settled out of court. Upon learning of the incident, MAPS cut ties with the therapists, reported the ethical violation to health authorities, issued a public statement about it, gave Buisson US$15,000 to obtain therapy while her civil case against Yensen was ongoing, and instituted a new code of ethics for the trials that explicitly prohibited sexual contact between participants and therapists. However, MAPS has been criticized for missing the incident and for not viewing the video footage of her therapy session for years after it happened. In addition, concerns have been raised that the effects of MDMA, including artificial emotional intimacy and trust, may increase the risk of boundary violations.

Devenot and Psymposia are prominent critics of the nonprofit MAPS and its corporate entity Lykos Therapeutics generally. They are said to have eventually turned against MAPS following its formation of the for-profit Lykos Therapeutics in 2014. Psymposia has accused MAPS and Lykos Therapeutics of being "cult-like", of perpetuating "white supremacy, capitalism, and imperialism", and of enabling "entrapment, sexual abuse and coercive control", among other allegations. Some former MAPS employees have also reportedly echoed the "cult-like" claim. Devenot has also expressed, about the psychedelic industry in general, that "global financial and tech elites are instrumentalizing psychedelics as one tool in a broader world-building project that justifies increasing material inequality." In addition, Nickles has written of strategies for damaging psychedelic pharmaceutical companies and nonprofit organizations through persistent critical media coverage. Although Psymposia is now highly critical of MAPS, Devenot formerly volunteered for MAPS from 2011 to 2017 and Normand spoke very positively about MAPS as late as 2018. Devenot says that they were "bullied out of the field of psychedelic research by a MAPS employee".

On June 4, 2024, seven Psymposia representatives are reported to have attended and spoken at the Food and Drug Administration (FDA)'s advisory hearing for Lykos Therapeutics's MDMA-AT for PTSD New Drug Application (NDA). They included Psymposia members Brian Pace, Russell Hausfeld, and Neşe Devenot, among others who were not specifically named. During the public comments period, the Psymposia representatives sharply criticized Lykos Therapeutics, including Hausfeld raising concerns about potential exploitation and mistreatment of veterans, Devenot urging independent review of clinical trial video recordings to investigate the possibility of additional cases of therapist abuse, and Pace and Devenot accusing Lykos Therapeutics of being a "therapy cult", among other misconduct allegations. The panel later overwhelmingly recommended rejection of MDMA-AT for PTSD, citing both major weaknesses of Lykos Therapeutics' NDA as well as mentioning Psymposia's allegations. The FDA followed suit and rejected the NDA of MDMA-AT for PTSD on August 9, 2024. Despite the rejection, MAPS and Lykos Therapeutics are continuing to develop and seek approval of MDMA-AT for PTSD. However, they have had to court additional corporate funding sources towards this aim.

In 2023, Psymposia published a four-part series investigating the Church of Psilomethoxin (now the Church of Sacred Synthesis) and its claims about its supposed sacrament psilomethoxin. The church claims to biosynthesize psilomethoxin (a chemical cross between 5-MeO-DMT and psilocybin) in psilocybin mushrooms by enriching the substrate used to grow the mushrooms with 5-MeO-DMT. The church's members sign up for the church online and the church sells and mails its sacrament to its members, which led to the church being referred to as the "mail-order mushroom church". Though the church claims that its sacrament contains psilomethoxin, an independent chemical analysis in 2023 failed to detect psilomethoxin or 5-methoxypsilocybin in their mushrooms, but did detect the usual constituents of psilocybin mushrooms such as psilocybin. Psymposia has criticized the Church of Psilomethoxin as engaging in "psychedelic charlatanism". In April 2024, the church sued Psymposia and others for alleged defamation. The church's lawsuit against Psymposia was later dismissed in August 2024, with the cited dismissal reason being anti-SLAPP laws.

== Controversy ==
Critics have accused Psymposia of false and exaggerated accusations, bias, reactivity, aggressive tactics, and of having had an outsized and inappropriate influence on the FDA advisory panel's decision to reject Lykos Therapeutics' MDMA-AT for PTSD.

Psymposia has been said to have a "take-no-prisoners approach" in terms of how it conducts itself. Members of the psychedelic medicine community have reportedly been targeted by Psymposia, and more than four dozen people in the field have anonymously expressed fear of the group. It has been accused of making false accusations and of damaging reputations and careers, such as those of psychedelic professionals Beatriz Labate and Veronika Gold, among others In addition, the group has been said to have attacked veterans' groups that supported Lykos Therapeutics' MDMA-AT for PTSD application. Former Psymposia member Nickles has written critically about veterans as well as the police generally. However, the group has subsequently disputed accusations that they have been critical of veterans' groups and police, arguing that these claims were taken out of context and stating that they believe that veterans deserve quality care. Psymposia has also been reported to have targeted one of its own former members, Mayorga, due to her criticizing one of their social media posts. This included mailing a 28-page letter to the university she was attending that accused her of "discrimination, bullying and intimidation". Former members Nickles and Ross have left Psymposia alleging "undisclosed unethical behavior" by other members. Psymposia has said themselves that they have been excluded from the mainstream psychedelic movement and the group has been banned from multiple psychedelic conferences.

Of 32 speakers at the FDA hearing of MDMA-AT for PTSD, 10 of them opposed the approval of the therapy and 7 of those 10 have been said to have been Psymposia representatives. Three of the representatives, including Pace, Hausfeld, and Devenot, were official Psymposia members. Speaking to Subliminal Jihad podcast, Normand claimed that anyone speaking critically of the application was labeled an "affiliate of Psymposia." Hausfeld noted that "there wasn't even seven" members of Psymposia at the time of the hearing.

The Psymposia representatives are reported to have presented themselves as experts in the field of psychedelics and to have not disclosed their affiliation with Psymposia. In addition, critics have noted that none of the Psymposia representatives who spoke at the hearing had expertise in medicine or therapy. The hearing panelists repeatedly asked Psymposia speakers about their allegations, expressed concern about them, and a majority of the panelists mentioned the allegations in their decisions to reject the therapy. Devenot claimed credit for the rejection on social media, stating "Yesterday, beyond my wildest expectations, we made international news in a David and Goliath-scale, 'dark horse' victory". It has been noted however that the role of Psymposia in the rejection is unclear and Lykos Therapeutics' NDA also had considerable flaws. Following the FDA hearing, Psymposia has enlisted a public relations firm to amplify their attacks against Lykos Therapeutics. They declined to disclose who was funding their work. At the same time, multiple public relations firms, including one hired by Lykos Therapeutics, have started advocating for approval of MDMA-AT for PTSD following the hearing.

The allegations against Psymposia have been detailed in-depth by journalists Andrew Jacobs and Rachel Nuwer in a New York Times article published in February 2025 titled "How a Leftist Activist Group Helped Torpedo a Psychedelic Therapy". Nuwer is notable in being the author of the 2023 book I Feel Love: MDMA and the Quest for Connection in a Fractured World. Former Psymposia members Ross and Nickles have responded to the New York Times article saying that it "contains numerous inaccuracies and misleading assertions which we are working to get the paper to correct."

In March 2025, freelance journalist Katie MacBride writing for Slate Magazine stated that Jacobs' and Nuwer's reporting about Psymposia in the New York Times "was largely divorced from the events as I witnessed them, misleading in crucial ways, and journalistically bewildering. But what the story lacks in fully recounting why Lykos' application tanked, it makes up for in fostering outrage, scapegoating a fringe group, and establishing a useful narrative should the new HHS secretary want to reverse the FDA's decision." The article also claimed that "only three of Psymposia's five members spoke during the public comment period [of the FDA hearing], and none presented themselves as having expertise in medicine or therapy or suggested that expertise in psychedelics translated to expertise in medicine or therapy." The article states that Devenot identified as "an expert in 'psychedelic bioethics;'" Pace identified as "a lecturer teaching psychedelic studies;" and Hausfeld identified himself as "a journalist who reports on psychedelics."

In July 2025, John Semley of Wired Magazine reported that Psymposia had privately received US$185,000 in funding from the Sarlo Foundation in 2024. The president of the Sarlo Foundation, Susie Sarlo, had previously accused MAPS of elder abuse of her father and former MAPS donor George Sarlo. In addition, she had previously espoused anti-MDMA views, warning of it as a "tool for exploitation". When asked for comment, Devenot stated that "Psymposia members had spent years developing their analyses and raising the same concerns, long before receiving funding" and Normand said Psymposia is "nobody's attack dog." Semley also reported that it is "unknown exactly how Psymposia's criticisms factored into the FDA's final decision" and that people familiar with the FDA Complete Response Letter said that Psymposia's concerns were taken seriously, but the agency "cited issues with trial design" and "an underreporting of 'positive adverse events'".

== See also ==
- List of psychedelic news and media organizations
