= Psilocybin therapy =

Experimental use of psilocybin to treat anxiety & depression

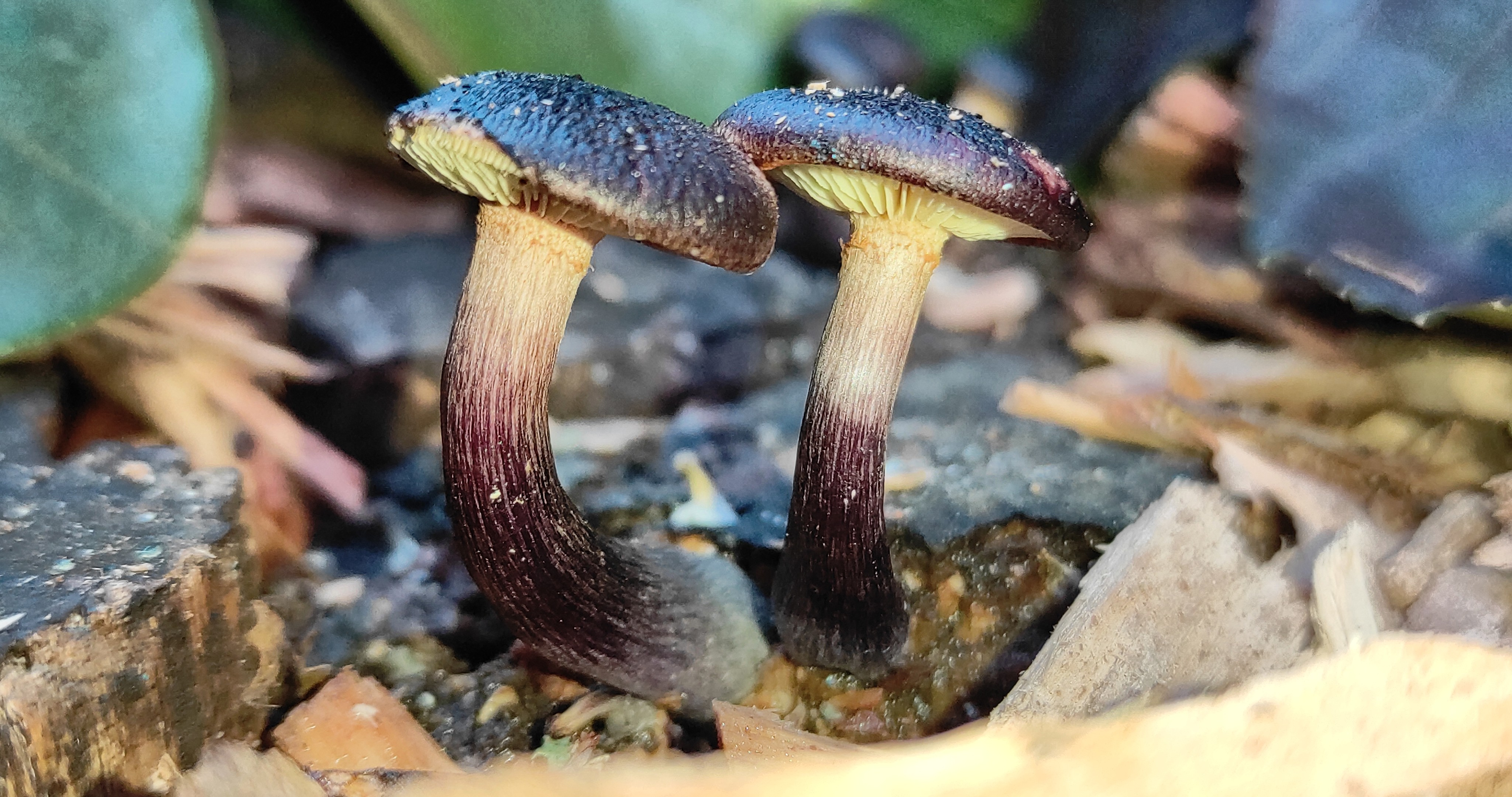
Psilocybin-containing mushrooms

Psilocybin therapy (or psilocybin-assisted therapy) is the use of psilocybin (the psychoactive ingredient in psilocybin mushrooms) in treating a range of mental health conditions, such as depression, anxiety, addictions, obsessive compulsive disorder (OCD), and psychosis. It is one of several forms of psychedelic therapy under study. Psilocybin was popularized as a psychedelic recreational drug in the 1970s and was classified as a Schedule I drug by the DEA. Research on psilocybin as a medical treatment was restricted until the 1990s because of the sociocultural fear of dependence on this drug. As of 2022, psilocybin is the most commonly researched psychedelic due to its safety and low potential for abuse and dependence. Clinical trials are being conducted at universities and there is evidence confirming the use of psilocybin in the treatment of depression, post-traumatic stress disorder (PTSD) and end-of-life anxiety.

== History ==
The first historical record of psilocybin use dates back to Mesoamerica. A Codex known as the "Yuta Tnoho" or "Vindobonensis Mexicanus I" that belonged to the Mixtec culture in the 1500s BCE depicted religious and medicinal ritual ingestion of psilocybin-containing mushrooms. Fungi were a prominent feature in Mixtec cultures, with over 5,000 different names of common edible mushrooms known across Mexican languages.

Despite colonists' efforts to eradicate these ceremonies, ritualistic consumption of Psilocybe mushrooms continues in modern spiritual and medicinal practice. The hallucinations produced by the psilocybin induce a trance-like state that is believed to allow the soul to disconnect from the body, resulting in healing and spiritual enlightenment.

Traditional psilocybin use was typically achieved through the consumption of dried or fresh psilocybin-containing mushrooms. However, in 1959, Albert Hofmann, a Swiss chemist, became the first person to extract pure psilocybin from the mushroom Psilocybe mexicana. Sandoz, the company that employed Hofmann, then began to sell the active compound to clinicians as an aid in psychedelic psychotherapy.

Albert Hofmann's discovery of psilocybin played a pivotal role in catalyzing the Psychedelic Era, a cultural phenomenon that unfolded during the 1960s and 1970s. This era witnessed significant societal, musical, and artistic transformations, many of which were heavily influenced by the use of psychedelic substances, including psilocybin. At this time, though, there was very little known about psychedelics and their long-term effects.

In August 1960, Timothy Leary conducted a self-experiment using psilocybin mushrooms. After trying pure, extracted psilocybin, he and Dr. Richard Alpert conducted research on whether it could help reduce recidivism rates and constitute an effective psychotherapy aid. In 1963, Leary and Alpert were suspended from their jobs at Harvard University, for engaging in irresponsible and dangerous experimentation with psilocybin mushrooms. Psilocybin research in the United States ended in 1970 when the use and possession of psilocybin mushrooms became illegal.

In 2018–19, the United States Food and Drug Administration (FDA) granted breakthrough therapy designation to facilitate further research for psilocybin in the possible treatment of depressive disorders.

== Neuroscience and pharmacology ==
Psilocybin is the main psychoactive compound in the mushroom genus Psilocybe. Psilocybin (O-phosphoryl-4-hydroxy-N,N-dimethyltryptamine) and its active metabolite psilocin (4-hydroxy-N,N-dimethyltryptamine) are part of a group of tryptamine/indolamine hallucinogens that are related to serotonin.

Psilocybin is a prodrug for psilocin, meaning that psilocybin is de-phosphorylated in the GI tract of the body into psilocin so it can cross the blood-brain barrier. Psilocin is a selective agonist of the 5-HT receptors, specifically 5-HT_{1A}, 5-HT_{1B}, 5-HT_{2A}, 5-HT_{2B}, and 5-HT_{2C}. Although to a lesser extent, psilocin also bonds to dopamine D_{3} receptors, which may aid in treating substance use disorders. Further, psilocin has some effect on the amygdala and hypothalamus that aids in circadian rhythm regulation.

Nausea, vomiting, muscle weakness, and lack of coordination are some of the physical side effects. Hallucinations and an inability to distinguish fiction from reality are among the psychological effects of psilocybin use. Panic attacks and psychotic-like episodes are also possible, especially if a large amount is consumed.

Chemical compound of psilocin

Chemical compound of psilocybin

== Research ==
Use of psilocybin for treating depression is under preliminary research. Evidence to date indicates that psilocybin therapy produces substantial reductions in depressive symptoms, for major depressive disorder and treatment-resistant depression, and also for depression associated with life-threatening cancer. Similarly, psilocybin therapy has been found to increase rates of remission from depression.

=== Neural mechanisms ===
Functional neuroimaging studies have explored potential neural mechanisms underlying psilocybin therapy's therapeutic effects, particularly in depression, anxiety and post-traumatic stress disorders.

One line of research has focused on the default mode network (DMN), a brain network involved in self-referential processing, autobiographical memory, and the sense of self, as playing a significant role in depression and anxiety. Research using functional magnetic resonance imaging (fMRI) has shown that psilocybin acutely reduces activity in the DMN, temporarily disrupting its connectivity patterns. This disruption is associated with a breakdown of rigid, maladaptive patterns of thought often observed in mood disorders. Subsequent restoration of DMN connectivity has been correlated with improved clinical outcomes, suggesting a potential neural mechanism underlying the therapeutic effects of psilocybin.

Psilocybin has also been shown to affect the amygdala, a brain region involved in emotional processing. Increased amygdala responsiveness to emotional stimuli, particularly fearful facial expressions, has been observed one day after treatment. This increased responsiveness has been associated with reductions in depressive symptoms, suggesting that psilocybin may temporarily restore emotional sensitivity, which is often blunted in depression, post-traumatic stress disorder, and anxiety disorders.

In addition, psilocybin has been found to enhance functional connectivity across various brain networks, promoting a more flexible and dynamic neural state. This increased connectivity may support long-term changes in emotional and cognitive patterns associated with therapeutic outcomes.

Finally, psilocybin induces a temporary increase in brain entropy, reflecting a more diverse and disorganized pattern of brain activity. This "entropic" state allows for a broader range of mental states and reduced dominance of habitual neural patterns, which may help disrupt maladaptive cognitive loops associated with depression and other mental health conditions.

== Safety ==
In the United States, psilocybin (along with other psychedelic drugs) has been heavily criminalized since the 1960s, classified as a Schedule I substance under the federal Controlled Substances Act (Schedule I is defined as a substance having substantial potential for abuse, absence of adequate safety evidence, and no currently accepted clinical uses for therapy). Prior to the 1960s, psychedelics were not considered "hard drugs", and were studied extensively for their medicinal potential for treating psychiatric disorders; the criminalization of psychedelics via their classification as Schedule I substances is inconsistent with over 70 years of scientific and medical research and was contrary to all available evidence at the time. According to the largest controlled clinical study of psilocybin to date at King's College London, volunteers who received doses of psilocybin experienced no serious adverse side effects, experiencing some changes in mood and perception but no negative effects on cognitive or emotional functioning.

An important area of concern is identifying appropriate candidates for psilocybin therapy. In patients with depression, it is important to consider psychological, social, and biological factors. These factors may predispose them to negative reactions to the substance and result in adverse events. Research into the effects of psilocybin on those experiencing suicidality varies. While some research found that psilocybin therapy could be destabilizing and upsetting to these patients, other studies found psilocybin treatment resulted in reduced suicidal behavior and thoughts.

== Legal status ==
In the United States, under the Controlled Substances Act, psilocybin is classified as a Schedule I drug. Heroin and LSD are examples of Schedule I substances, which have a high potential for misuse and have no accepted medical use in the US. They are currently petitions being made advocating for general considerations to sponsors developing psychedelic drugs for treatment of medical conditions (e.g., psychiatric disorders, substance use disorders). For psychedelic drugs that are Schedule I controlled substances, activities associated with IND (Investigational New Drug) must comply with the applicable Drug Enforcement Administration (DEA) regulations for research, manufacturing, importation/exportation, handling, and storage. Separately, while the use and possession of psilocybin in the United States is still illegal under federal law, several U.S. cities and a few states have decriminalized its use. In 2020, Oregon legalized psilocybin under controlled therapeutic conditions, leading to the opening of licensed psilocybin service centres in the state offering treatment for depression, PTSD, and other mental health conditions.

In Australia, authorized psychiatrists can prescribe psilocybin for treatment-resistant depression.

In New Zealand, authorized psychiatrists have been allowed to provide psilocybin therapy for treatment-resistant depression under tight restrictions beginning in 2025.

In Canada, beginning in 2020, some individuals with terminal illness experiencing end-of-life distress have been granted compassionate access to psilocybin-assisted therapy. As of 2023, more than 50 Canadians have received psilocybin-assisted therapy on this basis. In addition, Health Canada has allowed some health care professionals to use psilocybin mushrooms personally to help them develop future treatments.

In Germany, two facilities are allowed to offer psilocybin to adults with treatment-resistant depression through a established compassionate use program prior to regulatory approval.

In the Czech Republic, a law was passed allowing trained psychiatrists to provide psilocybin therapy under appropriate conditions, if supporting psychotherapy is provided. It can be provided for depression, PTSD, and substance use disorders.

In Switzerland, since 2014 authorized physicians have been allowed to offer psilocybin treatment in limited psychiatric cases.

In Jamaica, psychedelic retreats such as MycoMeditations provide psilocybin therapy as a result of psilocybin being legal, as Jamaica has never criminalized or banned the possession and use of psilocybin mushrooms.

== See also ==
- MDMA-assisted psychotherapy
- Psychedelic Alpha
- Psychoplastogen
- Psilocybin decriminalization in the United States
- Timeline of psychedelic legalization and decriminalization
