= MycoMeditations =

- Formation: 2014
- Type: Psychedelic therapy retreat center
- Headquarters: Treasure Beach, Jamaica
- CEO: Justin Townsend
- Website: mycomeditations.com

MycoMeditations is a psilocybin-assisted wellness retreat center located in Treasure Beach, Jamaica.

== History ==
MycoMeditations began in late 2014 as a small psilocybin mushroom retreat in Jamaica. In 2015, it was formally established in the Treasure Beach area on Jamaica's south coast as one of the first legal psychedelic retreat centers. Early retreats were small, with a few assistants supporting participants during psychedelic sessions.

By 2016, MycoMeditations began hosting psilocybin retreats full-time in Treasure Beach.

In the late 2010s, MycoMeditations expanded alongside growing public interest in psychedelic therapy. The 2017 release of Michael Pollan's book How to Change Your Mind and broader media coverage of the "psychedelic renaissance" prompted more people to seek legal psilocybin experiences abroad. As a result, MycoMeditations attracted guests pursuing relief from depression, anxiety, trauma, or seeking spiritual exploration.

By 2018–2019, it hosted regular programs and had served several hundred participants, becoming a recognized psychedelic retreat. It was noted for providing a legal setting and Afar magazine characterized it as “widely considered the gold standard in magic mushroom retreats.”

In 2019, Justin Townsend became CEO, which helped transition MycoMeditations to a more structured approach. It adopted a Western approach informed by protocols used at Johns Hopkins University. MycoMeditations also implemented a screening process for guests and ensured the presence of therapists on staff.

Despite a suspension of operations from March to August 2020 due to the COVID-19 pandemic, MycoMeditations experienced surging interest and demand once it restarted. In 2022, Netflix's miniseries How to Change Your Mind was released, bringing increased interest in and visits to psychedelic retreats like MycoMeditations, which hosted at least 40 retreats in 2023.
