= Meaghan Buisson =

Canadian ice skater and advocate (born 1979 or 1980)

- Born: ~1979 or 1980 (age 46–47)
- Education: Thompson Rivers University (BSc); University of Victoria (MSc—in-progress)
- Occupations: Former inline and ice speed-skater, ultrarunner, mental health advocate, researcher, writer, and speaker
- Years active: 1999–present
- Organization(s): BodyWhys Youth Canada (founder and director)
- Known for: Competitive speed skating, mental health advocacy and writing, and work against MDMA-assisted therapy
- Website: web.archive.org/web/20210619234744/https://www.meaghanbuisson.com/ web.archive.org/web/20130603002607/https://www.getwhys.ca/

Meaghan Buisson is a Canadian world record-holding former competitive inline and ice speed-skater as well as mental health advocate, researcher, writer, and speaker.

== Speed skating and mental health advocacy ==
In inline speed skating, Buisson is a 47-time Canadian national champion, 16-time Canadian record holder, 11-time international medalist, and the current world record holder in the solo marathon. She is said to have been one of Canada's top inline skaters and broke the world record in inline speed skating in the solo marathon in 2006. Subsequently, Buisson became a competitive ice speed-skater and set a provincial record in this sport. She competed in speed skating from 1999 until 2010. Buisson once received a traffic ticket for speeding—on skates—which received significant news coverage. After competitive skating, Buisson also became an ultrarunner and trained for races. She was featured in the 2007 book The 10 Most Inspiring Canadians by Kathryn Whitfield.

Buisson retired from skating due to serious injuries as well as personal trauma related to sexual abuse and assault that she had experienced. Earlier in her life, Buisson studied to become a veterinarian, but was unable to complete her program. After retiring from speed skating, Buisson worked as a hiking and wilderness guide. She has spoken publicly regarding her lived experiences of severe injury, mental health struggles, sexual abuse, homelessness, and poverty. This included being a contributing writer for Mad in America and writing critically about traditional psychiatric drugs and her lived experiences of iatrogenic harm with them. She also did an honors thesis at Thompson Rivers University critiquing clinical trial methodology of psychiatric drugs. Buisson was the founder and director of BodyWhys Youth Canada, a Canadian mental health charity.

== MDMA-assisted therapy trial ==
In 2013, Gabor Maté referred Buisson for a clinical trial of MDMA-assisted psychotherapy for management of treatment-resistant post-traumatic stress disorder (PTSD). In December 2014, she enrolled in the study, one of the phase 2 trials of MDMA-assisted therapy for PTSD being conducted by the Multidisciplinary Association for Psychedelic Studies (MAPS) and Lykos Therapeutics (now Resilient Pharmaceuticals). Buisson was treated by a married couple and renowned psychedelic-assisted psychotherapist pair named Donna Dryer and Richard Yensen, who are said to have been leading the trial or trial site, and Buisson was the first patient of a planned twelve but eventual six to be treated. Dryer was a licensed psychiatrist, while Yensen's psychologist license had lapsed in 2009, with MAPS requiring only one of two people per team be licensed.

Buisson wrote and spoke positively about her experiences with MDMA-assisted therapy in October 2016. However, in November 2018, she filed a complaint and civil lawsuit alleging misconduct by the couple and sexual abuse by Yensen. This included inappropriate physical contact such as cuddling and spooning during psychotherapy sessions in which she was under the influence of MDMA, the couple bringing Buisson to live near or with them on Cortes Island, British Columbia for further therapy, and Yensen having sex with her under the guise of it being exposure therapy for her PTSD. Buisson has said that Yensen also administered her drugs like ketamine during therapy sessions outside of the trial and pursued sex with her while she was intoxicated. A publicly released video recording documented repeated inappropriate physical contact during the trial sessions and Yensen admitted to the sexual relationship but claimed that it was consensual. Buisson completed her final active dosing session in the trial in October 2015, remained enrolled in the trial until her final follow-up in June 2016, and lived on Cortes Island from June 2015 until May 2017, with the sexual relationship beginning around the end of 2015 or start of 2016 while she was still in the trial.

Canadian professional organizations and legal standards state that clients cannot consent to sex with therapists and bar therapists from having sex with clients for at least two years after treatment has ended, with transgressions considered to constitute sexual abuse and resulting in licensing revocation. However, as Yensen was unlicensed, he was not formally bound to these rules and had no license to be stripped of. Nonetheless, MAPS themselves and others have contradicted Yensen and referred to his actions as "sexual abuse" or "sexual misconduct". Buisson's lawsuit alleged repeated sexual assault by Yensen and the case was settled out of court in June 2019. The Yensens have been unrepentant and have blamed Buisson for the events or have declined to comment. Police recommended criminal charges against Yensen, but prosecutors declined to pursue them, with their prosecutory standards requiring a "substantial likelihood of conviction". Dryer also gave up her medical license. Among other amends, MAPS cut ties with the Yensens following the incident, citing serious ethical violations, and provided Buisson with around CA$15,000 (US$11,570) for psychotherapy, but with the stipulation that she waive her right to sue them. MAPS's responses to the events have been criticized as inadequate, for instance declining to require both therapists in sessions to be licensed.

New York Magazine and Psymposia published an investigative podcast called Cover Story: Power Trip in 2022 which featured Buisson and her damaging experiences with MDMA-assisted psychotherapy. Buisson has co-authored critical academic articles on safety and harms of psychedelic-assisted therapy with researchers such as Sarah McNamee and Neşe Devenot, the latter of Psymposia. In April 2024, Buisson, with Devenot and others, filed a citizen's petition to the United States Food and Drug Administration (FDA) requesting that the advisory committee meeting on MDMA-assisted psychotherapy feature an extended public hearing. This was granted, and in June 2024, Devenot and others publicly testified at the hearing and a written statement by Buisson was read. The advisory committee overwhelmingly voted for the FDA to reject MAPS and Lykos Therapeutics's New Drug Application (NDA) of MDMA-assisted psychotherapy for treatment of PTSD, citing methodological and safety concerns, as well as most of the panelists mentioning Buisson and Psymposia's statements. In August 2024, the FDA declined to approve the therapy. The exact extent to which Buisson's case and Psymposia may have contributed to the rejection is unclear.

== Subsequent life ==
As of 2026, Buisson is completing her master's degree researching service dogs at the University of Victoria.

== Selected publications ==
- Buisson, Meaghan (20 October 2014). "Letter to a Patient". Mad In America. Archived from the original on 22 October 2016.
- Buisson, Meaghan (10 November 2014). "Contesting the Chemical Cure". Mad In America. Archived from the original on 16 November 2014.
- Buisson, Meaghan (20 January 2015). "Finding Rat Park". Mad In America. Archived from the original on 15 September 2016.
- Buisson, Meaghan (7 October 2016). "Psychedelic Series #1: Over the Mountain". Mad In America. Archived from the original on 8 October 2016.
- Lily Kay Ross and David Nickles (30 November 2021 – 22 March 2022). "Cover Story: Power Trip (Season 1)" (Podcast). Cover Story. Meaghan Buisson (interviewee in multiple episodes). New York Magazine, Psymposia.
- Devenot, Neşe; Tumilty, Emma; Buisson, Meaghan; McNamee, Sarah; Nickles, David; Ross, Lily Kay (9 March 2022). "A Precautionary Approach to Touch in Psychedelic-Assisted Therapy". Petrie-Flom Center: Bill of Health.
- McNamee S, Devenot N, Buisson M (May 2023). "Studying Harms Is Key to Improving Psychedelic-Assisted Therapy-Participants Call for Changes to Research Landscape". JAMA Psychiatry. 80 (5): 411–412. doi:10.1001/jamapsychiatry.2023.0099. PMID 36988924.
- Devenot, Neşe; Buisson, Meaghan; Jaster, Alaina M.; Greenstien, Kayla; Pace, Brian (28 April 2024). "Citizen Petition to Convene an Advisory Committee Meeting on MDMA-Assisted Therapy With an Extended Open Public Hearing" (PDF). Regulations.gov. U.S. Food and Drug Administration.
- Buisson, Meaghan (4 June 2024). [Public comment statement] (Speech). Meeting of the Psychopharmacologic Drugs Advisory Committee. Statement read by Sarah Grosh. Silver Spring, Maryland: U.S. Food and Drug Administration. Archived from the original (PDF) on 20 June 2026.
- Devenot N, Hausfeld R, Pace B, Normand B, Buisson M, Curtis J (10 October 2025). "The Psychedelic Syndicate: Parts 1–4" (PDF). Psymposia. Archived from the original on 23 October 2025.
