= What a Trip: The Rick Doblin Story =

- Poster for the trailer of the film shown at Psychedelic Science 2023.
- Directed by: Nirvan Mullick
- Produced by: Nirvan Mullick, Dream Mullick, Darren Aronofsky (Executive Producer)
- Starring: Rick Doblin, others
- Cinematography: Jeffrey Schneider
- Production company: Interconnected Media
- Language: English

WHAT A TRIP: The Rick Doblin Story, formerly known as Prescription X is an in-production crowdfunded documentary film about Rick Doblin and his efforts towards legalization of psychedelics and MDMA over the course of over 50 years. It is being directed by filmmaker Nirvan Mullick and executive produced by Darren Aronofsky. A trailer for the film was shown at the Multidisciplinary Association for Psychedelic Studies (MAPS)'s Psychedelic Science 2023 conference. Originally planned to be released following FDA approval of MDMA-assisted therapy for treatment of post-traumatic stress disorder (PTSD), the film is expected to be completed by the end of 2027.

== See also ==
- List of psychedelic documentaries
