= Resilient Pharmaceuticals =

American public benefit corporation

- Lykos Therapeutics logo
- Formerly: Lykos Therapeutics; MAPS Public Benefit Corporation; MAPS PBC
- Type: Public benefit corporation
- Industry: Pharmaceutical; Psychedelic medicine
- Founded: 2014; 12 years ago
- Headquarters: United States
- Website: lykospbc.com

Resilient Pharmaceuticals, formerly known as Lykos Therapeutics and before that as the MAPS Public Benefit Corporation (MAPS PBC), is a public benefit corporation (PBC) developing MDMA ("ecstasy") for potential medicinal use. It was founded and is part-owned by the non-profit Multidisciplinary Association for Psychedelic Studies (MAPS). MAPS PBC was founded in 2014 and was renamed to Lykos Therapeutics in January 2024, then to Resilient Pharmaceuticals in August 2025.

== MDMA-assisted psychotherapy development program ==
MAPS raised $140 million to fund the development of MDMA for PTSD. However, fundraising ultimately fell short, forcing a change of strategy. MAPS PBC was rebranded to Lykos Therapeutics, which raised a further $100 million. Rick Doblin, the founder and former chief executive of MAPS, has said he wished that MDMA for PTSD could have been developed purely with philanthropic funding, but that this goal had failed. MAPS had also originally followed an "anti-patent" strategy and not patent MDMA. In December 2022 however, MAPS PBC filed patents for MDMA at specific particle sizes, and these patents were published in June 2024. In January 2025, the patents were rejected by the USPTO and patent protection was not granted.

In December 2023, MAPS PBC completed phase 3 clinical trials of MDMA-assisted psychotherapy for treatment of post-traumatic stress disorder (PTSD) and filed a New Drug Application (NDA) of MDMA for this indication with the United States Food and Drug Administration (FDA). MDMA-assisted psychotherapy showed substantial effectiveness over placebo for treatment of PTSD in the two phase 3 studies. This included PTSD remission rates of 67 to 71% with MDMA-assisted psychotherapy versus 32 to 48% with placebo-assisted therapy.

== FDA rejection and subsequent developments ==
In June 2024, an 11-member FDA advisory panel of independent experts voted overwhelmingly against MDMA-assisted psychotherapy for PTSD. Based on the data submitted, they voted 9-2 against it being effective and 10-1 against its benefits outweighing its risks. The reasons cited for the rejection included concerns about functional unblinding, the side effects of MDMA such as cardiovascular effects, lack of detailed data collection on the misuse potential-related effects of MDMA in the trials, and accusations of professional bias, among others. The leftist and anticapitalist psychedelic media organization Psymposia has been accused of inappropriately influencing the hearing and contributing to the rejection, although these accusations have also been disputed. Historically, the FDA has followed the recommendations of its advisory panels when evaluating and approving NDAs. Despite the fact that the FDA had previously signed off on the phase 3 trial design in 2017, including notably the handling of placebo controls and agreeing to an inactive placebo control group, the FDA ultimately decided to follow its advisory panel's recommendations and reject Lykos Therapeutics's NDA for MDMA-assisted psychotherapy for PTSD in August 2024. They requested further data on the effectiveness and safety of MDMA-assisted psychotherapy for PTSD, including requiring a third phase 3 trial. According to Doblin and Lykos Therapeutics, this would take two years or more to complete. They and other critics maintained that many of the FDA's requests could be addressed with existing data, post-approval studies and requirements, and referencing of the existing scientific literature.

In August 2024, days following the FDA's rejection of MDMA-assisted psychotherapy for PTSD, three papers on MDMA-assisted psychotherapy for PTSD by MAPS and Lykos Therapeutics researchers were retracted from the journal Psychopharmacology, with the reason cited being ethical violations. These included inappropriate physical contact with a trial participant by an unlicensed therapist that had occurred at one of the phase 2 clinical sites in Canada of MDMA-assisted psychotherapy and that had been followed by an unethical sexual relationship between the participant and therapist as well as alleged sexual assault of the participant by the therapist after the trial. MAPS and Lykos Therapeutics didn't directly disclose the ethical violations to the journal and didn't remove the data from that site from their analyses. However, they had publicly disclosed the violations and reported them to government agencies years before in 2019. In addition, MAPS had cut ties with the therapist and instituted a new ethics code explicitly forbidding sexual contact between patients and therapists. Psychopharmacology initially requested that MAPS PBC issue a correction by removing the relevant data from the analyses, which the company reportedly had complied with.

On August 2024, also following the FDA's rejection, Lykos Therapeutics announced that it would lay off 75% of its workforce, which was about 100 employees, and that Doblin would resign from its board but remain with MAPS. The Chief Executive Officer (CEO) of Lykos Therapeutics was formerly Amy Emerson. In September 2024, she stepped down and was succeeded by Michael Mullette. In January 2025, five more Lykos Therapeutics board members left the company and were replaced by new directors.

In October 2024 and January 2025, despite setbacks, it was reported that Lykos Therapeutics had had productive new meetings with the FDA and was continuing to pursue approval of MDMA-assisted psychotherapy for PTSD. Doblin himself considers eventual FDA approval likely, but believes that it may take a few more years. In January 2025, it was reported that Antonio Gracias, a billionaire investor, former Tesla board director, and Elon Musk ally, was attempting to take control of Lykos Therapeutics with $100 million in new investment and proposals to restrengthen its ties with MAPS towards the goal of attaining FDA approval of MDMA-assisted psychotherapy. Doblin has backed the plan. In March 2025, it was reported that Gracias' takeover of Lykos Therapeutics, which at the time was seen as a shift towards the company's non-profit, public benefit centered roots.

In August 2026, Resilient Pharmaceuticals resubmitted its NDA to the FDA with new data.

== Market competition ==
Other companies are also developing MDMA-assisted psychotherapy for treatment of PTSD and other psychiatric disorders. However, none are close to approval as of late 2024. Other companies, such as MindMed and Tactogen, are also developing other entactogens besides MDMA or racemic MDMA for treatment of psychiatric disorders as well.

== See also ==
- List of psychedelic pharmaceutical companies
- List of investigational hallucinogens and entactogens
- I Feel Love: MDMA and the Quest for Connection in a Fractured World
- What a Trip: The Rick Doblin Story
- Meaghan Buisson
