= Leo Zeff =

American psychologist and psychotherapist

- Born: May 14, 1912
- Died: April 13, 1988 (aged 75)
- Other name: The Secret Chief
- Known for: Work with psychedelics and other psychoactive drugs

Leo Zeff (May 14, 1912 – April 13, 1988) was an American psychologist and psychotherapist in Oakland, California who pioneered the use of LSD, ecstasy (MDMA), and other psychoactive drugs in psychotherapy in the 1970s. He was referred to as "The Secret Chief" in a posthumously published collection of conversations due to his role his early work with MDMA. Zeff focused on training other therapists in psychedelic-assisted methods, creating a network of practitioners.

== Research and legacy ==
In 1977, when Alexander Shulgin introduced Zeff to MDMA, the drug was still legal. Zeff popularized it in the psychotherapeutic community, dubbing it "Adam" because he believed it returned one to a state of primordial innocence. After personally trying MDMA, Zeff began guiding sessions with the substance and went on to introduce it to an estimated 150 therapists, who collectively worked with thousands of patients before the drug’s prohibition. These sessions were typically conducted in quiet, controlled environments with patients wearing eyeshades and listening to carefully chosen music. Due to his work with MDMA, Zeff has been referred to as the "Johnny Appleseed" of MDMA-assisted therapy.

Leo Zeff was introduced to LSD in 1961 when he was working as a Jungian therapist, and he developed a method for administering LSD to patients during psychotherapy. Working with carefully screened patients only, the major aim of the first (and possibly only) session involved finding the patient's correct LSD dose. The patient underwent the early part of the experience wearing an eye mask whilst listening to music. Zeff being available to give emotional support if needed. If the experiences became difficult, Zeff recommended facing it and going with it. In later parts of the experience, patients looked at photographs of family members and themselves. His approach emphasized “set and setting”—a concept that underscores the importance of the patient’s mindset and environment—long before this terminology became widespread in psychedelic literature.

Prior to working with psychedelics, Leo Zeff had been a lieutenant colonel in the U.S. Army.

== See also ==
- Claudio Naranjo
- Richard Yensen
