= Richard Yensen =

- Born: ~1946 or 1947 (age 78–79)
- Other name: Richard Yensen Pérez-Venero
- Education: University of California, Irvine
- Occupation: Psychotherapist
- Years active: 1972–present
- Employer(s): Johns Hopkins University, Harvard Medical School, University of Maryland, Multidisciplinary Association for Psychedelic Studies, Lykos Therapeutics
- Organization(s): Orenda Institute; Heart of the Shaman
- Known for: Work with entactogen- and psychedelic-assisted therapy
- Spouse: Donna Dryer Pérez-Venero
- Website: researchgate.net/profile/Richard-Yensen orenda.org

Richard Yensen is an American–Panamanian psychologist and psychedelic drug researcher.

He was a research fellow at the Maryland Psychiatric Research Center (MPRC) of the Spring Grove Hospital from 1972 until its closure in 1976. Yensen studied psychedelic-assisted psychotherapy under Stanislav Grof at the MPRC and did his 1975 Ph.D. dissertation on 3,4-methylenedioxyamphetamine (MDA)-assisted psychotherapy through the University of California, Irvine. Along with Claudio Naranjo, he is one of the foremost pioneers of entactogen-assisted psychotherapy.

Yensen has taught at Harvard Medical School, Johns Hopkins University, and the University of Maryland Medical School. His wife is psychiatrist and psychedelic drug researcher Donna Dryer. Yensen developed a novel non-drug shamanistic form of psychotherapy known as perceptual affective therapy. The Yensens are the founders and directors of the Orenda Institute, a psychedelic-assisted therapy organization aimed at continuing the work of centers like the MPRC. In the 1990s, the Yensens attempted to launch government-approved studies of LSD-assisted psychotherapy for treatment of alcoholism and other uses in the United States (FDA IND 3250), but this was ultimately unsuccessful and they soon opted to move to Canada instead.

Subsequently, the Yensens worked in the Canadian phase 2 clinical trials of MDMA-assisted psychotherapy for post-traumatic stress disorder (PTSD) conducted by the Multidisciplinary Association for Psychedelic Studies (MAPS) and Lykos Therapeutics (now Resilient Pharmaceuticals) in the 2010s. They are said to have been leaders of the trial they were involved in. In 2018, Meaghan Buisson, a patient in one of the trials treated by the Yensens and a world record-holding former speed-skater, filed a complaint and civil lawsuit against the Yensens in 2018 alleging misconduct by the couple and sexual abuse by Yensen. This included inappropriate physical contact such as cuddling and spooning during psychotherapy sessions in which she was under the influence of MDMA, the couple bringing Buisson to live with or near them on Cortes Island, British Columbia for further therapy, and Yensen having sex with her under the guise of it being exposure therapy for her PTSD. Buisson has said that Yensen also administered her drugs like ketamine during therapy sessions outside of the trial and pursued sex with her while she was intoxicated.

Buisson's lawsuit alleged repeated sexual assault by Yensen and the case was settled out of court in June 2019. The Yensens have been unrepentant and have blamed Buisson for the events or have declined to comment. MAPS and others have referred to Yensen's actions as "sexual abuse" or "sexual misconduct". Police recommended criminal charges against Yensen, but prosecutors declined to pursue them, with their prosecutory standards requiring a "substantial likelihood of conviction". Dryer also gave up her medical license as a result of the incident in 2023. Among other amends, MAPS cut ties with the Yensens following the events. The Yensens have faced lawsuits from multiple past psychedelic-assisted therapy clients.

The Yensens have run a private retreat or workshop called Heart of the Shaman on Cortes Island, British Columbia.

== Selected publications ==
- Yensen, Richard (September 1973). Group Psychotherapy with a Variety of Hallucinogens (PDF). Eleventh Annual Meeting of the Association for Humanistic Psychology. Montreal, Canada. Archived from the original on 2026-06-19.
- Yensen, Richard (1975). The Use of 3, 4 Methylenedioxyamphetamine (MDA) as an Adjunct to Brief Intensive Psychotherapy with Neurotic Outpatients (PDF) (PhD thesis). Irvine, California: University of California, Irvine. Archived from the original on 2026-06-19.
- Yensen R, Di Leo FB, Rhead JC, Richards WA, Soskin RA, Turek B, Kurland AA (October 1976). "MDA-assisted psychotherapy with neurotic outpatients: a pilot study" (PDF). J Nerv Ment Dis. 163 (4): 233–45. doi:10.1097/00005053-197610000-00002. PMID 972325. Archived from the original (PDF) on 2026-06-19.
- Richards, William A.; Rhead, John C.; Dileo, Francesco B.; Yensen, Richard; Kurland, Albert A. (1977). "The Peak Experience Variable in DPT-Assisted Psychotherapy with Cancer Patients" (PDF). Journal of Psychedelic Drugs. 9 (1): 1–10. doi:10.1080/02791072.1977.10472020. ISSN 0022-393X. Archived from the original on 2026-06-19.
- Rhead, John C.; Soskin, Robert A.; Turek, Ibrahim; Richards, William A.; Yensen, Richard; Kurland, Albert A.; Ota, Kay Y. (1977). "Psychedelic Drug (DPT)-Assisted Psychotherapy with Alcoholics: A Controlled Study". Journal of Psychedelic Drugs. 9 (4): 287–300. doi:10.1080/02791072.1977.10472060. ISSN 0022-393X.
- Yensen R (1985). "LSD and psychotherapy". J Psychoactive Drugs. 17 (4): 267–277. doi:10.1080/02791072.1985.10524331. PMID 3910781.
- Yensen, Richard (1988). "Helping at the edges of life: Perspectives of a psychedelic therapist". Journal of Near-Death Studies. 6 (3): 149–161. doi:10.1007/BF01073363. ISSN 0891-4494.
- Yensen, Richard (1989). "From Mysteries to Paradigms: Humanity's Journey from Sacred Plants to Psychedelic Drugs" (PDF). In Rätsch, Christian (ed.). The Gateway to Inner Space: A Festschrift in Honor of Albert Hofmann. Prism Press. pp. 11–53. Archived from the original on 2026-06-19.
- Nichols D, Yensen R, Metzner R, Shakespeare W (1993). "The Great Entactogen-Empathogen Debate" (PDF). Newsletter of the Multidisciplinary Association for Psychedelic Studies. 4 (2): 47–49.
- Yensen, Richard; Dryer, Donna (1995). "Thirty Years of Psychedelic Research: The Spring Grove Experiment and Its Sequels" (PDF). Yearbook of the European College for the Study of Consciousness (ECBS) 1993-1994 [European College of Consciousness (ECBS) International Conference: Worlds of Consciousness]. Berlin, Germany: Verlag für Wissenschaft und Bildung. pp. 73–101. Archived from the original on 2026-06-19.
- Yensen, Richard (1995). "Toward a Psychedelic Medicine" (PDF). Yearbook for Ethnomedicine and the Study of Consciousness (1). Verlag für Wissenschaft und Bildung: 51–69.
- Yensen, Richard (1996). "From Shamans and Mystics to Scientists and Psychotherapists: Interdisciplinary Perspectives on the Interaction of Psychedelics Drugs and Human Consciousness" (PDF). In Winkelman, Michael; Andritzky, Wolfgang (eds.). Sacred Plants, Consciousness, and Healing. Verlag für Wissenschaft und Bildung. Archived from the original on 2026-06-19.
- Yensen, Richard; Dryer, Donna (Spring 1997). "Update: LSD Research at Orenda Institute". MAPS Bulletin. 7 (2). Multidisciplinary Association for Psychedelic Studies: 4.
- Yensen, Richard; Dryer, Donna A. (1998), The Consciousness Research of Stanislav Grof: A Cosmic Portal Beyond Individuality (PDF), archived from the original on 2026-02-09
- Tupper KW, Wood E, Yensen R, Johnson MW (October 2015). "Psychedelic medicine: a re-emerging therapeutic paradigm" (PDF). CMAJ. 187 (14): 1054–1059. doi:10.1503/cmaj.141124. PMC 4592297. PMID 26350908.

== See also ==
- Meaghan Buisson § MDMA-assisted therapy trial
