= How to Change Your Mind =

2018 book by Michael Pollan

- First edition cover
- Author: Michael Pollan
- Audio read by: Michael Pollan
- Cover artist: Craig Cutler (photo)
- Language: English
- Subject: Psychedelics
- Publisher: Penguin Press
- Publication date: May 15, 2018
- Publication place: United States
- Media type: Print (hardcover and paperback)
- Pages: 480
- ISBN: 978-1-59420-422-7 (hardcover)
- Dewey Decimal: 615.7/883
- LC Class: RM324.8 .P65 2018

How to Change Your Mind: What the New Science of Psychedelics Teaches Us About Consciousness, Dying, Addiction, Depression, and Transcendence is a 2018 book by Michael Pollan. It became a No. 1 New York Times best-seller. How to Change Your Mind chronicles the history of psychedelic drugs, from their turbulent 1960s heyday to the resulting backlash and more recent revival. Through his coverage of the recent resurgence in this field of research, as well as his own personal use of psychedelics via a "mental travelogue", Pollan seeks to illuminate not only the mechanics of the drugs themselves, but also the inner workings of the human mind and consciousness.

The book received many positive reviews, and Netflix released a documentary based upon it in 2022.

== Structure ==
The book is organized into six chapters with an epilogue:

1. A Renaissance
2. Natural History: Bemushroomed
3. History: The First Wave
4. Travelogue: Journeying Underground
5. The Neuroscience: Your Brain on Psychedelics
6. The Trip Treatment: Psychedelics in Psychotherapy

== Promotion ==
Pollan has been interviewed concerning the book on popular podcasts such as The Tim Ferriss Show, The Kevin Rose Show and The Joe Rogan Experience.

== Reception ==
The New York Times Book Review named How to Change Your Mind one of the best books of 2018.

Kevin Canfield of the San Francisco Chronicle wrote: "In 'How to Change Your Mind', Pollan explores the circuitous history of these often-misunderstood substances, and reports on the clinical trials that suggest psychedelics can help with depression, addiction and the angst that accompanies terminal illnesses. He does so in the breezy prose that has turned his previous books – these include The Omnivore's Dilemma and Cooked, the inspiration for his winning Netflix documentaries of the same name – into bestsellers."

Jacob Sullum of the libertarian magazine Reason gave the book a generally positive review, but faulted Pollan for criticizing Timothy Leary's self-promotion without allocating blame to the politicians and journalists who shut down the promising scientific study of psychedelics.

Writing in New York magazine, conservative journalist Andrew Sullivan praised How to Change Your Mind as "astounding."

How to Change Your Mind received two positive reviews from Vox. Ezra Klein described it as "one of the most mind-expanding books I have read this year." Sean Illing said that Pollan "describe[s] what it's like to take psychedelics. But beyond that, he also walks the reader through the history of these drugs and surveys the latest research into their therapeutic potential. It's a sprawling book that is likely to change how you think not just about psychedelic drugs but also about the human mind."

Mark Rozzo reviewed How to Change Your Mind in Columbia magazine. He wrote that the book "offers a convincingly grown-up case for the potential of drugs that, having survived decades of vilification, now seem poised to revolutionize several fields, from mental health to neuroscience."

Oliver Burkeman wrote of the book in The Guardian: "How to Change Your Mind is Pollan's sweeping and often thrilling chronicle of the history of psychedelics, their brief modern ascendancy and suppression, their renaissance and possible future, all interwoven with a self-deprecating travelogue of his own cautious but ultimately transformative adventures as a middle-aged psychedelic novice."

Drew Gwilliams reviewed the book for the scientific journal Chemistry World. He called it "a fascinating history of psychedelic drugs" and said "Pollan approaches the topic with a combination of intelligent curiosity and skepticism, deftly avoiding controversial debates while seeking clarity and comprehension."

== Television adaptation ==
In 2021, Pollan began working on a four-part documentary film adaptation of the book for Netflix, exploring LSD, psilocybin, MDMA and mescaline. It was released on July 12, 2022.

== See also ==
- How to Change Your Mind (2022 docuseries)
- List of psychedelic literature
