= Psychedelic therapy =

Use of psychedelic drugs as treatment

Psychedelic therapy (or psychedelic-assisted therapy) refers to the proposed use of psychedelic drugs in mental health treatment practices. The drugs proposed to treat mental disorders and improve well-being include mescaline (peyote), LSD, psilocybin and psilocin (mushrooms), ayahuasca, DMT, 5-MeO-DMT, ibogaine and MDMA. (Note: MDMA and ketamine are not classical psychedelics but are sometimes discussed alongside classical psychedelics due to similarities in their psychoactive and potentially therapeutic effects. Ketamine is perhaps more unusual; while MDMA, much like classical psychedelics, is usually used in a context of psychedelic-assisted psychotherapy, ketamine is predominantly administered as a standalone pharmacotherapy as opposed to ketamine-assisted psychotherapy. For ketamine to be effective against depression and pain, a psychedelic experience is not necessary, although some studies suggest that causing such an experience fosters enhanced benefits.) As of 2021, psychedelic drugs are controlled substances in most countries and psychedelic therapy is not legally available outside clinical trials, with some exceptions.

The procedure for psychedelic therapy differs from that of therapies using conventional psychiatric medications. While conventional medications are usually taken without supervision at least once daily, in contemporary psychedelic therapy the drug is administered in a single session (or sometimes up to three sessions) in a therapeutic context. The therapeutic team prepares the patient for the experience beforehand and helps them integrate insights from the drug experience afterwards. After ingesting the drug, the patient normally wears eyeshades and listens to music to facilitate focus on the psychedelic experience, with the therapeutic team interrupting only to provide reassurance if adverse effects such as anxiety or disorientation arise.

As of 2022, the body of high-quality evidence on psychedelic therapy remains relatively small and more, larger studies are needed to reliably show the effectiveness and safety of psychedelic therapy's various forms and applications. On the basis of favorable early results, ongoing research is examining proposed psychedelic therapies for conditions including major depressive disorder, anxiety and depression linked to terminal illness, and post-traumatic stress disorder. The United States Food and Drug Administration has granted "breakthrough therapy" status, which expedites the potential approval of promising drug therapies, (Note: The Food and Drug Administration describes the designation of breakthrough therapy as "a process designed to expedite the development and review of drugs that are intended to treat a serious condition and preliminary clinical evidence indicates that the drug may demonstrate substantial improvement over available therapy on a clinically significant endpoint(s).") to psychedelic therapies using psilocybin (for treatment-resistant depression and major depressive disorder) and MDMA (for post-traumatic stress disorder).

Psychedelic substances have a long history of use in spiritual and therapeutic contexts, from ancient shamanic practices to mid-20th-century clinical research. After widespread experimentation with LSD, psilocybin, and other psychedelics in the 1950s and 1960s, regulatory crackdowns—including the U.S. Controlled Substances Act of 1970—largely halted scientific study, though underground therapy continued. Interest resurged in the early 2000s with advances in neuroscience and imaging, leading to renewed clinical trials. Research faces methodological limitations, ethical concerns, and issues of equitable access. Additionally, commercialization, patenting, and venture capital investment have raised debates over ethics, cultural appropriation, and potential conflicts of interest. Despite these challenges, public interest and regulated therapeutic programs—including psilocybin facilitator training in Oregon—signal a growing integration of psychedelics into mental health treatment and wellness practices.

== History ==
=== Prehistoric use of psychedelic substances ===
Humans have long consumed psychedelic substances derived from cacti, seeds, bark, and roots of various plants and fungi. Since ancient times, shamans and medicine men have used psychedelics as a way to gain access to the spirit world. Though western culture usually views the practice of shamans and medicine men as predominantly spiritual in nature, elements of psychotherapeutic practice can be read into the entheogenic or shamanic rituals of many cultures.

=== Research in the mid-20th century ===
Shortly after Albert Hofmann discovered the psychoactive properties of LSD in 1943, Sandoz Laboratories began widespread distribution of LSD to researchers in 1949. Throughout the 1950s and 1960s, scientists in several countries (e.g., U.S.A.: Langley Porter Psychiatric Institute, MKUltra) conducted extensive research into experimental chemotherapeutic and psychotherapeutic uses of psychedelic drugs. In addition to spawning six international conferences and the release of dozens of books, over 1,000 peer-reviewed clinical papers detailing the use of psychedelic compounds (administered to approximately 40,000 patients) were published by the mid-1960s. Proponents believed that psychedelic drugs facilitated psychoanalytic processes, making them particularly useful for patients with conditions such as alcoholism that are otherwise difficult to treat. However, many of these trials did not meet the methodological standards that are required today.

Researchers like Timothy Leary felt psychedelics could alter the fundamental personality structure or subjective value-system of an individual to great potential benefit. Beginning in 1961, he conducted experiments with prison inmates in an attempt to reduce recidivism with short, intense psychotherapy sessions. Participants were administered psilocybin during these sessions weeks apart with regular group therapy sessions in between. Psychedelic therapy was also applied in a number of other specific patient populations including individuals with alcoholism, children with autism, and persons with terminal illness.

=== Regulation and prohibition in the late 20th century ===
Throughout the 1960s, concerns raised about the proliferation of unauthorized use of psychedelic drugs by the general public (and, most notably, the counterculture) resulted in the imposition of increasingly severe restrictions on medical and psychiatric research conducted with psychedelic substances. Many countries either banned LSD outright or made it extremely scarce, and, bowing to governmental concerns, Sandoz halted production of LSD in 1965. During a congressional hearing in 1966, Senator Robert F. Kennedy questioned the shift of opinion, stating, "Perhaps to some extent we have lost sight of the fact that (LSD) can be very, very helpful in our society if used properly." In 1968, Dahlberg and colleagues published an article in the American Journal of Psychiatry detailing various forces that had successfully discredited legitimate LSD research. The essay argues that individuals in government and the pharmaceutical industry sabotaged the psychedelic research community by canceling ongoing studies and analysis while labeling genuine scientists as charlatans.

Studies on medicinal applications of psychedelics ceased entirely in the United States when the Controlled Substances Act was passed in 1970. LSD and many other psychedelics were placed into the most restrictive "Schedule I" category by the United States Drug Enforcement Administration. Schedule I compounds are claimed to possess "a high potential for abuse and the potential to create severe psychological and/or physical dependence" and have "no currently accepted medical use", effectively rendering them illegal to use in the United States for all purposes. Despite objections from the scientific community, authorized research into therapeutic applications of psychedelic drugs had been discontinued worldwide by the 1980s.

Despite broad prohibition, unofficial psychedelic research and therapeutic sessions continued nevertheless in the following decades. Some therapists exploited windows of opportunity preceding scheduling of particular psychedelic drugs. Informal psychedelic therapy was conducted clandestinely in underground networks consisting of sessions carried out both by licensed therapists and autodidacts within the community. Due to the largely illegal nature of psychedelic therapy in this period, little information is available concerning the methods that were used. Individuals having published information between 1980 and 2000 regarding psychedelic psychotherapy include George Greer, Ann and Alexander Shulgin (PiHKAL and TiHKAL), Myron Stolaroff (The Secret Chief, regarding the underground therapy done by Leo Zeff), and Athanasios Kafkalides.

=== Resurgence in the early 21st century ===
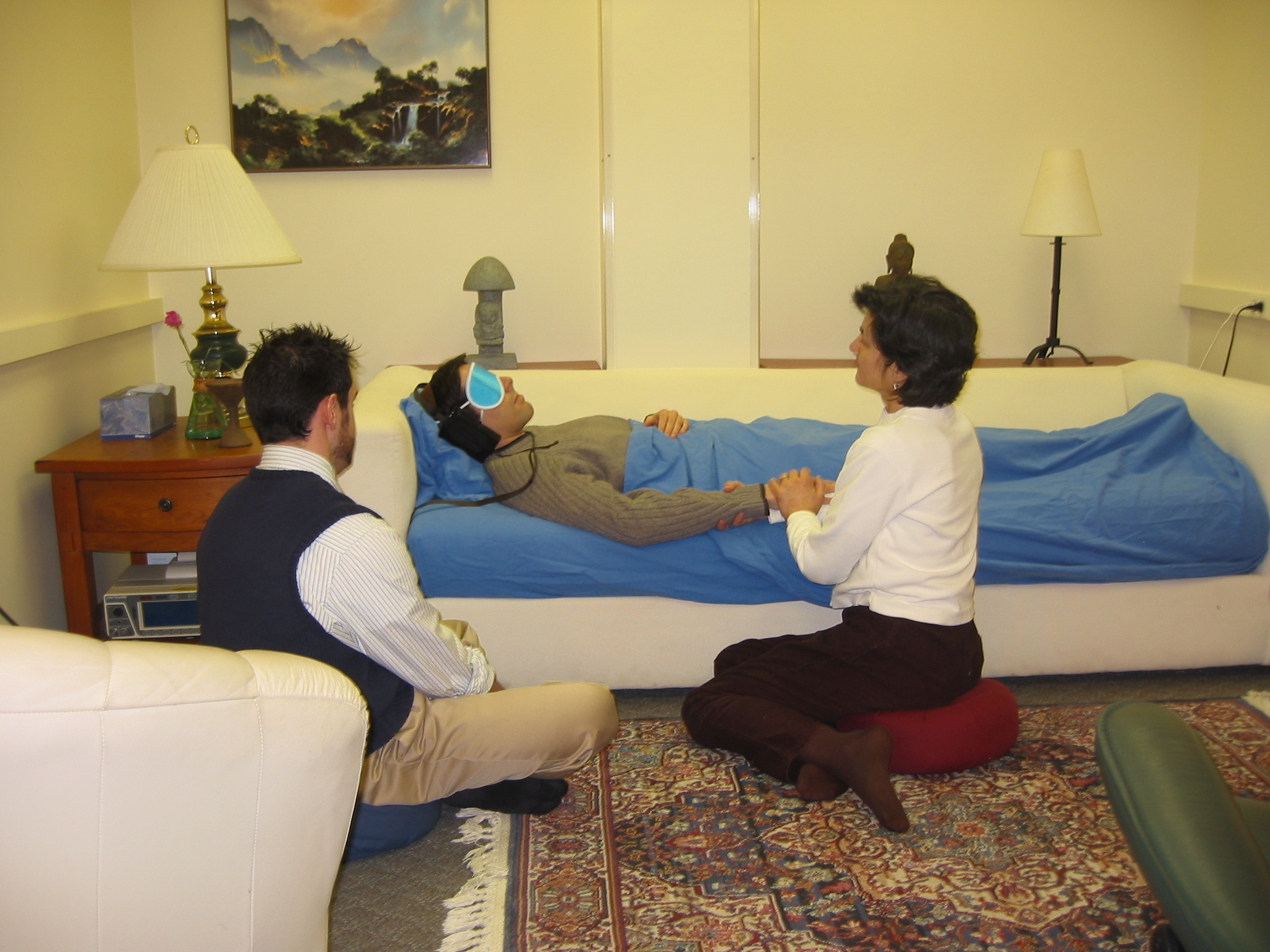
Psilocybin session at Johns Hopkins

In the early 2000s, a renewal of interest in the psychiatric use of psychedelics contributed to an increase in clinical research centering on the psychopharmacological effects of these drugs and their subsequent applications. Advances in science and technology allowed researchers to collect and interpret extensive data from animal studies, and the advent of new technologies such as PET and MRI scanning made it possible to examine the sites of action of hallucinogens in the brain. Furthermore, retrospective studies involving users of illicit drugs as voluntary subjects were conducted, allowing data to be collected on how psychedelics affect the human brain while simultaneously sidestepping bureaucratic difficulties associated with providing illegal substances to subjects. The new century also ushered in a broader change in political attitude towards psychedelic medicine—specifically within the Food and Drug Administration. Curtis Wright, then deputy director of the FDA Division of Anesthetic, Critical Care and Addiction Drugs explained a motivation for this change: "the agency was challenged legally in a number of cases and also underwent a process of introspection, asking 'Is it proper to treat this class of drugs differently?'"

As of 2014, global treaties listing LSD and psilocybin as "Schedule I" controlled substances continues to inhibit a better understanding of these drugs. Much of the renewed clinical research has been conducted with psilocybin and MDMA in the United States with special permission and breakthrough therapy designations by the FDA, while other studies have investigated the mechanisms and effects of ayahuasca and LSD. MDMA-assisted psychotherapy is being actively researched by Resilience Therapeutics, formerly known as Lykos Therapeutics and MAPS.

As of 2023, many new centers for psychedelics research have been launched, including the Centre for Psychedelic Research at Imperial College London, the UC Berkeley Center for the Science of Psychedelics, the Center for Psychedelic and Consciousness Research at Johns Hopkins University, the Transdisclipinary Center for Research in Psychoactive Substances at the University of Wisconsin–Madison, the Center for Psychedelic Research and Therapy at Dell Medical School at the University of Texas at Austin, the Center for Psychedelic Psychotherapy and Trauma Research at the Icahn School of Medicine at Mount Sinai, the Psychae Institute in Melbourne, and the Naut sa mawt Center for Psychedelic Research at Vancouver Island University. Harvard will create a Study of Psychedelics in Society and Culture.

A survey published in 2023 found strong support for psychedelic therapy among psychiatrists in the United States, revealing a significant positive shift in attitudes toward this treatment modality in comparison to a previous survey published in 2018. More than half of psychiatrists in the 2023 study expressed intentions to incorporate psychedelic therapy into their practice if regulatory approval is granted. In Australia, authorised psychiatrists can prescribe psilocybin for treatment-resistant depression, and MDMA for post-traumatic stress disorder.

In 2024, an FDA advisory panel voted against approving MDMA-assisted therapy for PTSD, "raising questions about the credibility of the research being conducted and the safety of those involved in the trials". The FDA advisors voted 9-2 that the available data didn't show MDMA was effective in treating PTSD, and 10-1 that the benefits of MDMA-assisted therapy did not outweigh the risks. However, the U.S. Department of Veterans Affairs has since committed $1.5 million to its first study on psychedelic-assisted therapy for PTSD and alcohol use disorder in veterans, signaling growing institutional interest despite FDA skepticism. In addition, veteran-led nonprofits like the Heroic Hearts Project are working with researchers to expand access to psychedelic therapies for military personnel and veterans.

In 2025, PsychedeliCare launched a European Citizens' Initiative aiming to enable the implementation of psychedelic-assisted therapies in the EU to ensure safe and affordable psychedelic-assisted therapies. When it ended, on 14 January 2026, the EU had received 74,016 signatures, or 7.4 per cent of the required one million signatures.

== Applications ==
Although the history behind psychedelics has hindered research into their potential value as medical treatments, scientists are now able to legally conduct studies and renew research that was halted in the 1970s. Some research has found that psychedelics can help treat mental disorders such as obsessive-compulsive disorder, post-traumatic stress disorder, alcoholism, depression, and cluster headaches. Psychedelic drugs which may have therapeutic uses include psilocybin (the main active compound found in "magic" mushrooms), mescaline (the main active compound in the peyote cactus), and LSD. Well-known psychedelics that have been used to this day are: LSD, DMT, psilocybin, mescaline, 2C-B, 2C-I, 5-MeO-DMT, AMT, ibogaine, and DOM. In general, the mechanism of action of how these drugs have therapeutic effects is poorly understood. The effects of psychedelics are strongly dependent on the environment in which they are given and on the recipient's state of mind (set and setting).

=== In substance use disorders ===
Studies by Humphry Osmond, Betty Eisner, and others examined the possibility that psychedelic therapy could treat alcoholism (or, less commonly, other addictions). Bill Wilson, the founder of Alcoholics Anonymous, used LSD during supervised experiments with Betty Eisner, Gerald Heard, and Aldous Huxley. He ingested LSD for the first time on August 29, 1956. With Wilson's invitation, his wife Lois and Nell Wing also participated in experimentation of this drug. Later Wilson wrote to Carl Jung, praising the results and recommending it as validation of Jung's spiritual experience. According to Wilson, the session allowed him to re-experience a spontaneous spiritual experience he had had years before, which had enabled him to overcome his own alcoholism.

A 1998 review of the effectiveness of psychedelic therapy for treating alcoholism concluded that due to methodological difficulties in the research prior to that time, it was not possible to state whether it was effective. A 2012 meta-analysis found that "In a pooled analysis of six randomized controlled clinical trials, a single dose of LSD had a significant beneficial effect on alcohol misuse at the first reported follow-up assessment, which ranged from 1 to 12 months after discharge from each treatment program. This treatment effect from LSD on alcohol misuse was also seen at 2 to 3 months and at 6 months, but was not statistically significant at 12 months post-treatment. Among the three trials that reported total abstinence from alcohol use, there was also a significant beneficial effect of LSD at the first reported follow-up, which ranged from 1 to 3 months after discharge from each treatment program."

In 2022 a systematic review was published on the efficacy of ibogaine/noribogaine, an indole alkaloid with "anti-addictive" properties, to treat substance use disorders looking at studies up to December 2020. Oral ingestion of ibogaine leads to an intense psychedelic experience with effects lasting up to 72 hours that lead participants to insights that may change the way they view life and their ways of thinking; however, the mechanism of how this drug works to reduce substance use is not yet understood. Evidence suggests that ibogaine does have some reduction on opioid and cocaine misuse, but more well designed, larger randomly controlled trials are required to fully understand the therapeutic benefits. Significant adverse reactions were experienced by participants including cardiotoxicity, QT prolongation, ataxia, psychosis, and several fatalities were reported due to toxic adverse events. Analysis of the fatalities concluded that patients with cardiac comorbidities and that those that are taking concurrent medications are at higher risk of a medical emergency.

A systematic review completed in 2023, containing studies from the past decade, looked at the ability of psychedelic therapy in combination with psychotherapy to help reduce substance use, cravings, and abstinence of addictions including alcohol, cocaine, opioids, and nicotine. Studies commonly reported reductions in substance misuse, however, the quality of evidence is too low to draw solid conclusions on the efficacy of psychedelic treatments for substance use disorders.

However, a systematic review of human and animal studies showed that a single dose of LSD for treatment of alcohol use disorder led to greater odds of improvement in alcohol consumption than control participants.

=== In terminal illness ===
During the early 1950s and 1960s the National Institute of Mental Health sponsored the study of psychedelic drugs such as psilocybin and LSD to alleviate the debilitating anxiety and depression patients with terminal diagnoses may feel. While these early studies are hard to find, the resurgence of interest in psychedelic drugs to treat humans end of life mindset has led to some small studies in the 21st century. The more recently published research strengthens the findings from the 1950s and 1960s showing the drug is extremely effective in reducing anxiety and depression in this patient population once carefully screened and has few adverse effects when administered in a psychotherapy setting and under medical supervision. The psychologists leading psychedelic drug therapy trials found that end of life patients often experience the emotional turmoil of dying more than the physical aspects. This mindset makes it difficult for patients to find meaning and enjoyment in life during their last few months or years. While all patients have completely different experiences on these mind altering drugs the research subjects interviewed all expressed they had, "heightened clarity and confidence about their personal values and priorities, and a renewed or enhanced recognition of intrinsic meaning and value of life." More recently, researchers have argued that psychedelic therapy is beneficial for these patients because it may specifically reduce their fear of dying.

As of 2016, Johns Hopkins University and New York University have conducted large randomized, placebo-controlled studies. These two studies are some of the first large controlled studies measuring the effects of psychedelic therapy on depression and anxiety in cancer patients. Across clinician-ratings and self-ratings, the psychedelic treatment produced statistically significant lowered anxiety and depression, with sustenance for at least 6 months. The studies monitored for adverse effects from the drugs but no serious adverse effects were observed. Both studies also attributed the efficacy in part to patients experiencing a "mystical experience". A mystical experience is a very personal introspective experience where some sort of unity or transcendence of time and space is described. More research is necessary to expand generalizability of the conclusions. Also, more research is necessary to understand the biological properties of a mystical experience.

Evidence is growing for the use of atypical psychedelics such as ketamine for treating depression in terminally ill patients, with repeated IV administration having the most therapeutic effect. These studies did not have any patients experience any serious adverse effects; however, ketamine-induced ulcerative cystitis is a concern for repeated long-term administration. Qualitative studies are required to better understand the mechanism and thought process changes that lead to therapeutic outcomes.

=== In post-traumatic stress disorder (PTSD) ===
The Multidisciplinary Association for Psychedelic Studies (MAPS) is conducting studies in the psychedelic treatment of post-traumatic stress disorder. The Phase 2 trials of these studies, conducted in the U.S., Canada, and Israel, consisted of 107 participants who had chronic, treatment-resistant PTSD, and had had PTSD for an average of 17.8 years. Out of the 107 participants, 61% no longer qualified for PTSD after three sessions of MDMA-assisted psychotherapy two months after the treatment. At the 12-month follow-up session, 68% no longer had PTSD. Phase 2 trials conducted between 2004 and 2010 reported an overall remission rate of 66.2% and low rates of adverse effects for subjects with chronic PTSD. In 2017, MAPS and the FDA reached an agreement on the special protocol for phase 3 trials.

Evidence shows that MDMA-assisted psychotherapy versus control shows clinically significant improvement in Clinician-Administered PTSD Scale (CAPS) scores from baseline, with most of the patients no longer meeting the CAPS score for PTSD. Effects of MDMA-assisted psychotherapy can be observed up to 12 months after receiving 2-3 active sessions of moderate to high dose MDMA (75–125 mg).

Given the difficulties with appropriate blinding in trials of MDMA- and psychedelic-assisted psychotherapy, the results are likely overestimated. Furthermore, there are no superiority or non-inferiority clinical trials comparing MDMA-assisted psychotherapy to already existent evidence-based treatments for PTSD, but given the effects reported in clinical trials of MDMA-assisted psychotherapy for PTSD there is no reason to believe that this treatment modality is more effective than existent trauma-focused psychological treatments.

In 2024, an FDA advisory panel voted against approving MDMA-assisted therapy for PTSD, "raising questions about the credibility of the research being conducted and the safety of those involved in the trials". The FDA advisors voted 9-2 that the available data didn't show MDMA was effective in treating PTSD, and 10-1 that the benefits of MDMA-assisted therapy did not outweigh the risks. However, the U.S. Department of Veterans Affairs has since committed $1.5 million to its first study on psychedelic-assisted therapy for PTSD and alcohol use disorder in veterans, signaling growing institutional interest despite FDA skepticism.

In addition, veteran-led nonprofits like the Heroic Hearts Project are working with researchers to expand access to psychedelic therapies for military personnel and veterans.

=== In depressive and anxiety disorders ===
In 2019, the FDA approved the use of esketamine for intranasal use for major depressive disorder (MDD) and treatment-resistant depression (TRD), in conjunction with an oral antidepressant.

Also in 2019, the FDA granted "breakthrough therapy" status to psilocybin for treatment-resistant depression and major depressive disorder in order to hasten the process for potential regulatory approval. The designation of "breakthrough therapy" fast-tracks the study of drugs where preliminary clinical evidence shows that they could be substantially more effective than therapies that are already available. A 2024 meta-analysis of randomized controlled trials of treatment of depression with psilocybin therapy found that it provides antidepressant effects significantly above placebo.

Studies on the clinical effects of ayahuasca have found significant antidepressant and anxiety-reducing effects, leading to calls for further research to overcome methodological limitations in the existing studies.

There is some evidence that psilocybin in combination with MDMA could be helpful for treating psychiatric disorders, but only when administered in a controlled clinical setting.

There is limited evidence that reductions in suicidality scores can be observed immediately after administration of ayahuasca or psilocybin, observable up to 6 months after administration.

=== In Obsessive Compulsive Disorder (OCD) ===
Since 1964, multiple case studies with psychedelic drugs have been performed in patients with either diagnosed OCD or patients exhibiting obsessive and/or compulsive symptoms. In 1964 and 1977, two case studies were published that showed a reduction in symptoms of patients who had previously exhibited obsessive and/or compulsive behaviors after taking Psilocybe mushrooms. In addition, three studies from 1987 to 1997 reported reductions in obsessive and/or compulsive symptoms in patients with diagnosed OCD after taking LSD and psilocybin. In 2014 and 2021, two case studies published by researchers from Arizona and Mexico, respectively, explained how patients taking 2 grams of psilocybin every 2-3 weeks not only saw qualitative improvements in their OCD symptoms, but also sustained this symptom improvement for several weeks after each dose.

In 2024, a systematic review was published analyzing the possible therapeutic benefits of psychedelics on OCD and related disorders. Findings include that LSD may be less tolerable than psilocybin due to more potential exacerbations of anxiety and OCD symptoms. Case reports found that psilocybin must be given in repeated doses in order to maintain reduction in OCD symptoms, which differentiates from its effect on depression. In patients diagnosed with body dysmorphic disorder and OCD, a single dose of psilocybin given for OCD symptoms was found to increase insight into the patient's disease, resulting in these patients seeking mental health treatment and recognizing that more effort was needed to tolerate their obsessions and resist their compulsions. This is important because among individuals with OCD, poor insight into their condition is associated with a worse prognosis.

Because of existing research showing the efficacy of Exposure and Response Prevention (ERP) in psychiatric disorders, future studies may seek to combine psychedelic therapy, specifically with psilocybin, with ERP as an adjunct for symptom remission, although no such studies have yet been conducted.

=== In reducing criminal behavior ===
In 2017, researchers mainly from the University of Birmingham published research suggesting that psilocybin use is correlated with reduced criminal behavior. The researchers analyzed data from 480,000 U.S. adults collected by the National Survey on Drug Use and Health on their past use of psychedelics, including ayahuasca, dimethyltryptamine, LSD, mescaline, peyote, San Pedro, and psilocybin mushrooms. While other illicit drugs have been associated with increased criminal behavior, the researchers found that psychedelic substances were instead associated with reduced criminal behavior. Usage of these substances was associated with a 12% reduction in likelihood of assault, 18% reduction in likelihood of other violent crimes, 27% reduction in likelihood of committing larceny and theft, and 22% reduction in likelihood of committing other property crimes. These findings potentially support the use of psychedelic therapy in forensic and clinical settings.

In a prior 2014 study, researchers explored the relationship between recidivism and naturalistic hallucinogens in criminal justice populations with a history of substance use. The results concluded that hallucinogens promoted prosocial behaviors in a population which is typically associated with high recidivism rates. The usage of hallucinogens has been found to reduce supervision failure in ex-convicts. This inherently encourages drug abstinence, including the use of alcohol, resulting in lower rates of recidivism.

A 2018 study found that men who had used psychedelic drugs in the past were less likely to commit violence against their current partners compared to those who had not used these substances. The study suggests that the use of psychedelic drugs in men might be associated with a reduced likelihood of committing violence against intimate partners, potentially due to improved emotion regulation.

A 2022 U.S. study found that use of classic psychedelics was associated with lowered odds of criminal arrest. The research suggests that 7 of the 11 arrest variables were reduced with lifetime psilocybin use. Peyote use was found to reduce the odds of driving under the influence and vehicle theft. Lastly, mescaline use was found to reduce drug possession/sale. No other substances shared a positive relationship with reducing criminal behavior.

== Methods ==
=== Standard psychedelic therapy ===
The main approach used in the contemporary resurgence of research, often simply called psychedelic therapy, involves the use of moderate-to-high doses of psychedelic drugs. The psychedelic therapy method was initiated by Humphry Osmond and Abram Hoffer (with some influence from Al Hubbard) and replicated by Keith Ditman, and is more closely aligned to transpersonal psychology than to traditional psychoanalysis. Most recent research on psychedelic therapy has used psilocybin or ayahuasca.

Patients spend most of the acute period of the drug's activity lying down with eyeshades listening to music selected beforehand and exploring their inner experience. Dialogue with the therapists the drug session(s) but essential during the preparation session before and the integration session afterwards. The therapeutic team normally consists of a man and a woman, who are both present throughout the psychedelic experience. One aspect that occurs in most participants undergoing psychedelic therapy with moderate-to-high doses is transcendental, mystical, or peak experiences. Research has suggested that the strength of these experiences, together with discussion of them soon after in a therapeutic session, could be a major determinant of how great the longer-term effects on symptoms will be.

Some studies of psychedelic therapy have incorporated cognitive behavioral therapy (CBT) or motivational enhancement therapy (MET). Within a structured CBT intervention and a dose of psilocybin, patients are given the opportunity to experience cognitive and emotional states that are altered. With these psychedelic effects, cognitive reframing of detrimental schemas and self-identity can be modified positively.

In a MET environment, patients are able to reflect on their own behaviors to make changes in problematic manners, such as alcohol use disorder. Additionally, it could potentially enhance motivation to change and decrease possible ambivalence about behavioral changes. Within psychedelic drug sessions, through a reevaluation of the concept of self and reconnecting with core beliefs and values, this can be achieved.

Psychedelic-assisted group psychotherapy can be more cost-efficient, because therapists can split the costs among all participants of the group.

=== Psycholytic therapy ===
Psycholytic therapy involves the use of low-to-medium doses of psychedelic drugs, repeatedly at intervals of 1–2 weeks. The therapist is present during the peak of the experience to assist the patient in processing material that arises and to offer support. This general form of therapy was mostly used to treat patients with neurotic and psychosomatic disorders. The name psycholytic therapy was coined by Ronald A. Sandison, (Note: Ronald Sandison first referred to the psycholytic model in 1955 in a speech to the American Psychiatric Association, and used the term 'psycholytic therapy' at the 1960 'European Symposium on Psychotherapy Under LSD-25' at Göttingen University convened by Hanscarl Leuner. In 1964 Leuner formed the European Medical Society for Psycholytic Therapy.) literally meaning "soul-dissolving", refers to the belief that the therapy can dissolve conflicts in the mind. Psycholytic therapy was historically an important approach to psychedelic psychotherapy in Europe, and was also practiced in the United States by some psychotherapists, including Betty Eisner. In the time since the 1970s, psycholytic therapy has not been a focus of research.

Psychedelic drugs are useful for exploring the subconscious because a conscious sliver of the adult ego usually remains active during the experience. Patients remain intellectually alert throughout the process and remember their experiences vividly afterward. In this highly introspective state, patients are actively aware of ego defenses such as projection, denial, and displacement as they react to themselves and their choices.

The goal of the therapy is to provide a safe, mutually compassionate context through which the reliving of memories can be filtered through the principles of genuine psychotherapy. Aided by the deeply introspective state attained by the patient, the therapist assists him/her in developing a new life framework or personal philosophy that recognizes individual responsibility for change.

In Germany, Hanscarl Leuner designed a form of psycholytic therapy, which was developed officially but was also used by some socio-politically motivated underground therapists in the 1970s.

In Switzerland, Friedericke Meckel Fisher (trained by Stanislav Grof in Breathwork and Samuel Widmer in group psychedelic sessions) practiced group psycholytic therapy mainly from the early 2000s and until 2015. Meckel Fischer developed her own system of psycholytic therapy which she conducted underground, in group weekend sessions of 15 to 19 people, using medium dosages of psychedelic substances. She added and combined into this psycholytic group work, techniques of her own modified family constellation work, cathartic body work, evocative music, and periods of sharing and feedback within the group.

=== Other variations ===
==== Claudio Naranjo ====
The Chilean therapist Claudio Naranjo developed a branch of psychedelic therapy that utilized drugs like MDA, MDMA, harmaline, and ibogaine.

==== Anaclitic therapy ====
The term anaclitic (from the Ancient Greek "ἀνάκλιτος", anaklitos – "for reclining") refers to primitive, infantile needs and tendencies directed toward a pre-genital love object. Developed by two London psychoanalysts, Joyce Martin and Pauline McCririck, this form of treatment is similar to psycholytic approaches as it is based largely on a psychoanalytic interpretation of abreactions produced by the treatment, but it tends to focus on those experiences in which the patient re-encounters carnal feelings of emotional deprivation and frustration stemming from the infantile needs of their early childhood. As a result, the treatment was developed with the aim to directly fulfill or satisfy those repressed, agonizing cravings for love, physical contact, and other instinctual needs re-lived by the patient. Therefore, the therapist is completely engaged with the subject, as opposed to the traditional detached attitude of the psychoanalyst. With the intense emotional episodes that came with the psychedelic experience, Martin and McCririck aimed to sit in as the "mother" role who would enter into close physical contact with the patients by rocking them, giving them milk from a bottle, etc.

==== Hypnodelic therapy ====
Hypnodelic therapy, as the name suggests, was developed with the goal to maximize the power of hypnotic suggestion by combining it with the psychedelic experience. After training the patient to respond to hypnosis, LSD would be administered, and during the onset phase of the drug the patient would be placed into a state of trance. Levine and Ludwig found the combination of these techniques to be more effective than the use of either of these two components separately.

== Contraindications ==
Psychedelic therapy is contraindicated for people who:

- are pregnant,
- have a history of epilepsy/other seizure disorder,
- have severe cardiovascular disease including uncontrolled blood pressure, heart failure, coronary artery disease, or previous heart attack or stroke,
- use medications like SSRI or MAO-I antidepressants,
- have a personal or family history of primary psychotic or affective disorders like schizophrenia, schizoaffective disorder, Bipolar I disorder, or psychotic symptoms in the setting of depression.

== Criticisms and controversies ==
Although psychedelic therapy has shown promise in treating a range of mental health conditions—including depression, PTSD, and substance use disorders—it has also generated significant debate across ethical, cultural, and scientific domains. Critics have raised concerns about the overenthusiastic framing of psychedelics as a universal or revolutionary solution, cautioning that such narratives may overshadow limitations in clinical evidence, long-term safety data, and equity in access. Others argue that the rapid commercialization and medicalization of psychedelics risks reproducing existing structural inequalities in mental health care. In response, scholars have called for a more cautious, interdisciplinary approach that considers social context, informed consent, community frameworks, and culturally responsive practices.

=== Ethical and safety concerns ===
Critics have raised significant concerns regarding the ethical implications of psychedelic-assisted therapies, particularly focusing on the challenges surrounding informed consent and patient safety. The inherently unpredictable and often ineffable nature of psychedelic experiences can make it difficult for patients to fully comprehend and anticipate potential psychological risks. These challenges complicate the process of obtaining fully informed consent, especially in therapeutic contexts where long-term monitoring or integration support may be limited.

In August 2024, the U.S. Food and Drug Administration (FDA) declined to approve the first MDMA-based treatment for post-traumatic stress disorder (PTSD), citing insufficient data and concerns about trial methodology. The agency highlighted issues such as a "striking lack" of documentation regarding participants' prior substance use, problems with trial design, and the need for more robust evidence. The FDA requested an additional late-stage trial to further assess the drug's safety and efficacy.

Further ethical concerns have emerged from reports of misconduct within clinical trials. For instance, in August 2024, three papers on MDMA-assisted psychotherapy for PTSD were retracted from the journal Psychopharmacology due to ethical violations. These included inappropriate physical contact between a trial participant and an unlicensed therapist, leading to an unethical sexual relationship and alleged sexual assault. The data from this site were not removed from the analyses, raising questions about the integrity of the research.

The potential for therapist misconduct is a significant safety concern in psychedelic-assisted therapy. The altered states of consciousness induced by psychedelics can increase patients' suggestibility and vulnerability, necessitating rigorous ethical standards and oversight. Ensuring patient safety requires comprehensive training for therapists, strict adherence to ethical guidelines, and robust mechanisms for reporting and addressing any instances of misconduct.

Addressing these ethical and safety concerns is crucial for the responsible development and implementation of psychedelic-assisted therapies. This includes establishing clear protocols for informed consent, ensuring transparency in clinical trial methodologies, implementing stringent ethical standards for therapists, and conducting thorough long-term follow-up studies to monitor patient outcomes.

=== Methodological and structural limitations ===
Psychedelic clinical trials have faced recurring criticism for methodological shortcomings, particularly small sample sizes, short follow-up durations, and the exclusion of participants with comorbid or severe psychiatric conditions. These constraints reduce the external validity of findings, limiting their applicability to broader, real-world populations. For instance, many studies prioritize controlled environments and relatively healthy participants, thereby excluding those who may be most in need of innovative mental health treatments, such as individuals with trauma histories, substance use disorders, or severe depression.

In addition to these design limitations, sex and gender have received limited methodological attention in some areas of psychedelic research. A 2025 scoping review of studies on psychedelics for substance use disorders found that women were underrepresented and that sex-related effects were infrequently reported or discussed. Few studies evaluated differences among non-cisgender participants.

Racial and ethnic homogeneity also remains a persistent issue in psychedelic research. A review of 18 psychedelic clinical trials found that 82.3% of participants were non-Hispanic White, with minimal inclusion of Black, Latino, Indigenous, and Asian individuals. More recent analyses suggest that despite growing interest in equitable access, racial and ethnic minorities remain significantly underrepresented in both research studies and clinical practice settings.

These racial and ethnic disparities have sparked broader concerns about systemic exclusion and the equitable distribution of therapeutic benefits. Historical medical abuses—such as the Tuskegee Syphilis Study and CIA-led MKUltra experiments—have contributed to deep mistrust in research institutions among marginalized communities.

To address these disparities, scholars and clinicians have called for more inclusive and culturally responsive research practices. Proposed strategies include partnering with community organizations, diversifying research staff, and creating protocols that respect cultural traditions and concerns. Such efforts aim not only to expand access but also to rebuild trust and ensure that psychedelic-assisted therapies are effective and ethical across diverse populations.

=== Sociological critiques and inequality in access and outcomes ===
Although psychedelic therapy is often presented as a universally beneficial mental health intervention, emerging sociological and epidemiological research has identified disparities in outcomes across demographic groups. Studies suggest that benefits associated with psychedelic use may be unequally distributed due to structural and social inequalities.

Several peer-reviewed studies have documented that racial and ethnic minorities often experience diminished psychological benefits from psychedelics compared to White participants, even when controlling for socioeconomic status, education, and baseline health. Additional research focusing on American Indian areas has linked geographic and historical disadvantage to more limited mental health improvements following psychedelic use.

Gender differences have also been observed. Findings indicate that women may experience more variable or attenuated outcomes than men, particularly in relation to stigma reduction and distress. Other research suggests that education moderates these gender differences, with highly educated men reporting the strongest positive effects.

Disparities based on marital and employment status have also been explored. Individuals who are married or employed report greater psychological benefit, potentially due to social support systems and improved access to post-experience integration resources.

Variation has been noted in outcomes by religious affiliation and participation. Some studies suggest that individuals with strong religious integration may experience more meaningful or sustained benefits due to the availability of social and interpretive frameworks, while others with rigid or punitive religious backgrounds may experience conflict or distress.

LGBTQ+ individuals have also been found to experience unique patterns of benefit and risk in relation to psychedelic use. While some research documents substantial mental health improvements, others point to amplified vulnerability due to minority stress or inadequate therapeutic frameworks.

In addition, findings suggest that those from historically marginalized populations are more likely to avoid formal healthcare following psychedelic use due to prior stigma or systemic exclusion, potentially increasing risk or reducing access to integration services.

Collectively, this growing body of research challenges assumptions of universal benefit and has contributed to calls for equity-centered approaches in psychedelic science. These include greater attention to structural context, culturally responsive practices, and the inclusion of diverse communities in both research and therapeutic design.

=== Overmedicalization and commercialization ===
==== Marginalization of traditional and community-based healing ====
Scholars and activists have raised concerns that the medicalization of psychedelics risks marginalizing longstanding traditional, spiritual, and community-based approaches to healing using psychedelics. Tightly regulated clinical models—especially those requiring physician oversight and FDA approval—often exclude practices rooted in Indigenous knowledge, harm-reduction communities, or informal peer support structures. Critics argue that this narrowing of acceptable use may replicate colonial dynamics by privileging biomedical authority while disregarding alternative cultural and historical frameworks for psychedelic use.

Some researchers note that medical gatekeeping can deter vulnerable populations—especially those with prior trauma or medical mistrust—from seeking care. Others argue that community-first models, such as peer-led integration circles or underground networks, have demonstrated safety and efficacy outside of formal institutions but remain unrecognized in dominant medical discourse. These concerns have fueled calls for pluralistic frameworks that allow coexistence between clinical models and culturally grounded or community-led approaches to psychedelic healing.

==== Organizational influence and conflicts of interest ====
The influence of prominent organizations and individuals in the psychedelic field has raised concerns about transparency, accountability, and potential conflicts of interest. The Multidisciplinary Association for Psychedelic Studies (MAPS), a leading organization in psychedelic research and advocacy, has faced scrutiny regarding its internal governance and handling of ethical violations. In 2019, MAPS publicly disclosed that former clinical sub-investigators in a sponsored trial had violated ethical standards during therapy sessions. While MAPS stated that it responded promptly and transparently, critics questioned the adequacy of the organization's oversight mechanisms.

Further concerns emerged from the 2023 Psychedelic Science conference in Denver, Colorado, hosted by MAPS and the Multidisciplinary Association for Psychedelic Studies Public Benefit Corporation (MAPS PBC). The conference featured over 300 speakers, including academic researchers, therapists, entrepreneurs, and policy advocates. Many speakers disclosed financial interests in psychedelic companies, intellectual property claims, or affiliations with private clinics. Notable figures with such disclosures included:

- Robin Carhart-Harris, a leading neuroscientist in psychedelic research
- Bia Labate, an anthropologist and executive director of the Chacruna Institute
- Rick Doblin, founder and president of MAPS
- Tim Ferriss, author and investor
- Charles Raison, psychiatrist and director of the Center for Compassion Studies at the University of Arizona
- Matthew W. Johnson, professor of psychiatry and behavioral sciences at Johns Hopkins University

These conflict of interest disclosures were initially made available through the conference's mobile app by the Postgraduate Institute for Medicine (PIM) but were later removed. Psymposia, a nonprofit media organization, archived the full list to preserve public access and transparency.

Rick Doblin has faced criticism for his dual role as both an advocate and the head of an organization poised to benefit financially from the potential FDA approval of MDMA-assisted therapy. Observers argue that this overlap between activism, research, and commercial interest may compromise objectivity in public discourse and trial reporting.

Broader concerns have been raised about how financial entanglements could influence research agendas and regulatory frameworks. In 2024, the Petrie-Flom Center for Health Law Policy, Biotechnology, and Bioethics at Harvard Law School hosted a panel titled "Disclosed: Conflicts of Interest in the Psychedelics Ecosystem," which examined how investment structures, private equity, and market speculation are shaping the future of psychedelic medicine.

These developments have led to calls for independent oversight, greater funding transparency, and more inclusive governance models to protect the integrity of psychedelic science and practice.

==== Patents, venture capital, and market consolidation ====
As the psychedelic field attracts increasing financial interest, critics have raised alarms about the ethical and structural implications of venture capital investment, aggressive patent strategies, and the potential monopolization of psychedelic therapies. A number of biotechnology companies and investors have moved quickly to patent not only psychedelic compounds—such as psilocybin analogs and synthetic DMT—but also delivery methods, treatment protocols, and even aspects of the therapeutic experience itself. This surge of intellectual property claims has sparked debates over the ethics of commodifying substances that have deep cultural, communal, and spiritual significance.

Some researchers and Indigenous advocates argue that patenting naturally occurring substances or ceremonial knowledge represents a form of "biopiracy," in which Western institutions extract and profit from traditional practices without community consent or benefit-sharing mechanisms. The controversy has intensified as corporations such as COMPASS Pathways and MindMed have secured patents on specific synthetic formulations or therapy session structures, prompting concerns about limited access, market exclusivity, and the suppression of innovation.

In parallel, the influx of venture capital has raised questions about whether financial incentives may undermine patient well-being. Observers note that the pressure to deliver returns to shareholders could lead to expedited clinical trials, underreporting of adverse effects, or the commercialization of unproven therapies. These dynamics are increasingly seen as misaligned with the values of many early psychedelic researchers, who viewed the field as an opportunity to promote personal transformation, healing, and societal reflection rather than profit maximization.

To mitigate these risks, scholars and advocacy groups have called for stronger open-access protections, ethical licensing models, and international standards to prevent monopolistic control. Some propose that non-profit and community-based models be protected or prioritized in future regulatory frameworks to ensure the equitable and culturally sensitive development of psychedelic therapies.

== Public interest ==
A resurgence of public interest in psychedelic drug therapy in the 21st century has been driven in part by articles in The New Yorker, The New York Times, and The Wall Street Journal.

=== Psychedelic tourism ===
The first article to bring attention to the uses of psychedelic drugs for mental health was titled, "Seeking the Magic Mushroom", written by Robert Gordon Wasson and published in 1957 by TIME magazine. It detailed his experience traveling to Oaxaca, Mexico, and taking "magic mushrooms" (psilocybin) within the cultural practices that started the "trip" experience. Since that time, there has been growing interest within the United States to travel for these unique psychedelic experiences. Psychedelic retreats such as MycoMeditations have operated since 2014, providing psilocybin therapy to travellers coming predominantly from the United States. The market for psychedelic tourism is currently growing rapidly. While typically the vacation destinations for psychedelics are based in Central and South America, there is a rise in Western culture taking over their traditional practices. In the Netherlands, there are psychedelic society retreats ranging in cost from $500–1200 that center on a ceremony in which tourists take magic mushrooms and trip together for around six hours. There are also underground psychedelic "guides" popping up around the United States that include leaders who claim to assist people through their trip similar to shamans in other cultures. An article in The Guardian entitled "Welcome to the trip of your life: the rise of underground LSD guides" details various styles of guides that can be found within the United States. Disturbing psychedelic tourism experiences have been reported. For example, medical histories that might make psychedelic treatment contraindicated were not always obtained, prescription medications have been administered without obtaining relevant medical history, potentially dangerous combinations of substances have been given (such as ibogaine and 5MeO-DMT) without adequate precautions, sexual assaults have occurred, offers to purchase additional services have been made while people were still acutely intoxicated, insufficient coaching has been provided before and after the psychedelic session. Deaths have also been reported. There is no official count regarding the frequency of these adverse experiences.

=== Psilocybin therapy ===
Psilocybin therapy is the use of psilocybin (the psychoactive ingredient in psilocybin mushrooms) in treating a range of mental health conditions, such as depression, anxiety, addictions, obsessive compulsive disorder, and psychosis.

As of January 1, 2023, psilocybin services facilitator training is available for individuals aged 21 and above who are Oregon residents. To become a psilocybin facilitator, an individual must complete a 120-hour regulated facilitator course, after which they may guide a client through a psilocybin experience. The facilitator may not engage the client in therapy; the therapeutic sessions held before and after the psilocybin experience itself are held by a psychotherapist. Oregon Psilocybin Services began accepting license applications on January 2, 2023, with licensed psilocybin service centers beginning to accept clients in summer 2023.

== See also ==
- Category:Psychedelic drug researchers
- Concord Prison Experiment
- Hallucinogen
- History of lysergic acid diethylamide (LSD)
- James Fadiman
- List of investigational hallucinogens and entactogens
- Psilocybin decriminalization in the United States
- Psychedelia – Film about the history of psychedelic drugs
- Psychedelic Alpha
- Psychedelic microdosing
- Psychedelic replication
- Rick Doblin
- Robin Carhart-Harris
- Roland R. Griffiths
- Psychoplastogen
- Trip killer
