= Multidisciplinary Association for Psychedelic Studies =

American nonprofit organization

- Abbreviation: MAPS
- Established: 1986 (40 years ago)
- Founders: Rick Doblin
- Types: nonprofit organization
- Legal status: 501(c)(3) organization
- Headquarters: San Jose
- Country: United States
- Revenue: 5,480,520 United States dollar (2016)
- Total Assets: 60,010,171 United States dollar (2020)
- Website: maps.org

The Multidisciplinary Association for Psychedelic Studies (MAPS) is an American nonprofit organization working to raise awareness and understanding of psychedelic substances. MAPS was founded in 1986 by Rick Doblin and is now based in San Jose, California.

MAPS helps scientists design, fund, and obtain regulatory approval for studies of the safety and effectiveness of a number of controlled substances. MAPS works closely with government regulatory authorities worldwide such as the United States Food and Drug Administration (FDA) and the European Medicines Agency (EMA) to ensure that all of its sponsored research protocols conform to ethical and procedural guidelines for clinical drug research. Included in MAPS' research efforts are MDMA (methylenedioxymethamphetamine) for the treatment of posttraumatic stress disorder (PTSD); LSD and psilocybin for the treatment of anxiety, cluster headaches, and depression associated with end-of-life issues; ibogaine for the treatment of opiate addiction, ayahuasca for the treatment of drug addiction and PTSD; medical cannabis for PTSD; and alternative delivery systems for medical cannabis such as vaporizers and water pipes. MAPS officials say the organization's ultimate goal is to establish a network of clinics where these and other treatments can be provided together with other therapies under the guidance of trained, licensed physicians and therapists. In December 2023, MAPS submitted a New Drug Application (NDA) to the FDA for MDMA-assisted psychotherapy.

== History ==
As MDMA was now deemed illegal, held in the same category as such substances as heroin, the only way for it to be employed in scientific inquiry would be through the lengthy and expensive FDA approval process. Holding the belief that MDMA had the unique potential both to aid psychotherapy and eventually to become a prescription medicine, Rick Doblin sought to gain incorporation for MAPS as a 501(c)(3) nonprofit research and educational organization. The founding of MAPS was a primary step toward the future envisioning of what Doblin has called a "nonprofit psychedelic-pharmaceutical company."

=== MDMA for PTSD ===
Following the Food and Drug Administration (FDA)'s rejection of MAPS and Lykos Therapeutics' New Drug Application for MDMA-assisted psychotherapy (MDMA-AT) for treatment of post-traumatic stress disorder (PTSD), MAPS laid off 33% of its staff.

== Projects ==
Since 1986, MAPS has funded psychedelics and medical cannabis research and education. These include:

- Sponsored efforts by Lyle Craker, Medicinal Plant Program, UMass Amherst Department of Plant and Soil Sciences, to obtain a license from the Drug Enforcement Administration for a marijuana production facility.
- Sponsored analytical research into the effects of the marijuana vaporizer, leading to the first human study of marijuana vaporizers conducted by Donald Abrams of the University of California, San Francisco.

== Organization ==
=== Board and staff ===
MAPS is governed by a board of directors including John Gilmore, David Bronner, Robert J. Barnhart, and Rick Doblin. Ashawna Hailey served on the board until her death in 2011.

=== Funding ===
MAPS is a nonprofit 501(c)(3) research and educational organization, funded by donations from individuals and foundations. On August 20, 2020, having raised $30 million in non-profit donations in less than six months, MAPS and the Psychedelic Science Funders Collaborative (PSFC) announced the completion of the Capstone Campaign, a non-profit fundraising effort to fund the final research required to seek U.S. Food and Drug Administration (FDA) approval of MDMA-assisted psychotherapy for posttraumatic stress disorder (PTSD).

== Legal efforts ==
=== Medical cannabis monopoly ===
National Institute on Drug Abuse (NIDA) has a government granted monopoly on the production of cannabis for medical research purposes.

Currently, the National Institute on Drug Abuse (NIDA) has a monopoly on the supply of research-grade marijuana, but no other Schedule I drug, that can be used in FDA-approved research. NIDA uses its monopoly power to obstruct research that conflicts with its vested interests. MAPS had two of its FDA-approved medical marijuana protocols rejected by NIDA, preventing the studies from taking place. MAPS has also been trying without success for almost four years to purchase 10 grams of marijuana from NIDA for research into the constituents of the vapor from marijuana vaporizers, a non-smoking drug delivery method that has already been used in one FDA-approved human study.

—

NIDA administers a contract with the University of Mississippi to grow the nation's only legal cannabis crop for medical and research purposes, including the Compassionate Investigational New Drug program. United States federal law registers cannabis as a Schedule I drug. Medical marijuana researchers typically prefer to use high-potency marijuana, but NIDA's National Advisory Council on Drug Abuse has been reluctant to provide cannabis with high THC levels, citing safety concerns:

Most clinical studies have been conducted using cannabis cigarettes with a potency of 2-4% THC. However, it is anticipated that there will be requests for cannabis cigarettes with a higher potency or with other mixes of cannabinoids. For example, NIDA has received a request for cigarettes with an 8% potency. The subcommittee notes that very little is known about the clinical pharmacology of this higher potency. Thus, while NIDA research has provided a large body of literature related to the clinical pharmacology of cannabis, research is still needed to establish the safety of new dosage forms and new formulations. In the most recent rejection of medical marijuana by the Federal Government, the DEA denied Professor Craker, Valerie Corral, and MAPS request to end the federal governments monopoly on medical marijuana production and research.

—

In 2016, the Obama administration DEA announced their intent to grant additional licenses to marijuana growers for research, ending the NIDA monopoly on federally legal marijuana. The DEA finalized the proposed rule in early 2020.

== Controversy ==
A clinical participant in MAPS's phase 2 trials of MDMA-assisted psychotherapy for PTSD, Meaghan Buisson, was inappropriately cuddled and spooned by a husband-and-wife pair of therapists while on MDMA during one of her therapy sessions. A few months later, Buisson began living with the pair, Dr. Donna Dryer and Dr. Richard Yensen, in their home on a remote Canadian island for purposes of undergoing more therapy. Buisson eventually entered a sexual relationship with Yensen, allegedly under the guise of it being exposure therapy. The relationship continued for over a year. In 2018, Buisson filed a civil lawsuit alleging that Yensen had repeatedly sexually assaulted her. The suit was settled out of court.

Upon eventually learning of the ethical violation, MAPS cut ties with the therapists, reported the incident to health authorities, issued a public statement about it, gave Buisson US$15,000 to obtain therapy while her civil case against Yensen was ongoing, and instituted a new code of ethics for the trials that explicitly prohibited sexual contact between participants and therapists. A few years later, the incident was further reported on by Psymposia in their podcast series Cover Story: Power Trip, in which they strongly criticize MAPS. In addition, shortly after the podcast, Psymposia and Buisson released video excerpts of Buisson experiencing the inappropriate physical contact that had been recorded during her therapy session. The videos had been voluntarily given to Buisson by MAPS when she had asked for them previously. MAPS has been criticized for missing the video-recorded ethical violation and for not viewing the videos until years after it became aware of the incident.

== See also ==
- List of psychedelic pharmaceutical companies
- List of investigational hallucinogens and entactogens
- Lykos Therapeutics
- Bluelight (web forum)
- Beckley Foundation
- Heffter Research Institute
- Psychedelic Science
- What a Trip: The Rick Doblin Story
