= MDMA-assisted psychotherapy =

Controlled administration of psychoactive drug MDMA to facilitate psychotherapy efficacy

MDMA-assisted psychotherapy (MDMA-AT), also known as entactogen-assisted psychotherapy, is the use of prescribed doses of MDMA or sometimes other entactogens as an adjunct to psychotherapy sessions. MDMA-assisted psychotherapy is an effective treatment for post-traumatic stress disorder (PTSD), including complex PTSD (C-PTSD). Furthermore, it is currently under investigation as a treatment for various other mental health disorders, including major depressive disorder, social anxiety in people with autism, alcohol use disorder, and mood disturbances in individuals facing life-threatening illnesses. Other entactogens that have been used besides MDMA include MDA, MMDA, and methylone.

== Therapeutic effects ==
Post-traumatic stress disorder (PTSD) is most commonly treated by cognitive behavioral therapy (particularly prolonged exposure and cognitive processing therapy), eye movement desensitization and reprocessing (EMDR), and psychodynamic psychotherapy. However, over half of these patients continue to have PTSD after completing therapy, with results from war-related PTSD being especially poor.

PTSD is best treated when a patient is in the 'optimal arousal zone', in which emotions are engaged, yet not overwhelming. In this zone, four symptom clusters of PTSD are sedated:

1. re-experiencing
2. avoidance
3. negative alterations in cognition/mood
4. alterations in arousal and reactivity

Subjects with PTSD exhibit extreme emotional numbing or anxiety and struggle to remain in the optimal arousal zone during conservative therapies. Threatening interpretations of memories are reinforced when patients are in low emotional states. If traumatic memories are revisited in therapy when a patient is not within the optimal arousal state, therapy for PTSD can actually increase the patient's trauma.

When used in therapy, MDMA has been reported to increase empathy, closeness between patient and therapist, relaxation, motivation to engage with therapy and introspective thought, and reduce depression and anxiety. MDMA makes it easier for a patient to stay in the optimal arousal zone by decreasing feelings of anxiety and defensiveness when revisiting traumatic memories. By increasing feelings of closeness and empathy, it can improve the patient's trust in the therapist and encourage introspective thought to reassess memories and actions. Furthermore, research suggests that treatment may improve the quality of sleep of individuals affected by PTSD-related sleep disturbances. It is believed that these factors may increase the success rate of psychotherapy.

Adverse effects, which can last from a few hours to several days, include diminished appetite, anxiety, headache, jaw tightness, tinnitus, nausea, asthenia (weakness), fatigue, sinusitis, nasopharyngitis, upper respiratory tract infection, disturbance in attention, tremor, tics, dysuria, erythema, and depression.

== Research ==
In 2017, a Phase II clinical trial led to a breakthrough therapy designation by the U.S. Food and Drug Administration (FDA). With that FDA approval, MDMA has been authorized for use in research related to psychotherapy. A large proportion of this research has been focused on treating PTSD and major depressive disorder.

The research is controversial in part because recreational MDMA use has been associated with harmful effects among some users. A 2022 systematic review and meta-analysis found that MDMA-assisted psychotherapy reduced PTSD symptom severity compared to control conditions.

=== PTSD ===
Multiple 2020 and 2021 systematic reviews found MDMA-assisted psychotherapy to be an effective treatment for PTSD, more than any other pharmacological-assisted psychotherapy.

Published later in 2021, a phase III study indicated that MDMA-assisted therapy represents a potential breakthrough treatment for severe PTSD that merits expedited clinical evaluation. Based on this study, MDMA-assisted psychotherapy was granted breakthrough therapy designation by the FDA, a designation that indicates that there is preliminary evidence that an intervention might offer a substantial improvement over other options for a serious health condition. However, given the lack of blinding, several researchers have postulated that the results of the phase III trial might be heavily influenced by expectancy effects. There are no trials comparing MDMA-assisted psychotherapy to already existing first-line psychological treatments for PTSD which seems to attain similar or elevated symptom reduction compared with that due to MDMA-assisted psychotherapy based on indirect evidence.

=== Major depressive disorder ===
There have been several studies that investigated MDMA-assisted psychotherapy as a potential treatment for major depressive disorder (MDD). An analysis of six phase II trials showed a trend toward significance, while a phase III trial reported that MDMA-assisted psychotherapy had antidepressant effects. Given that unprocessed trauma is considered a causative factor in some individuals with depression, it has been proposed that the benefit observed in PTSD trials might be applicable to MDD as well.

=== Other ===
MDMA-assisted psychotherapy is currently under investigation as a treatment for various other mental health disorders, including social anxiety in people with autism, alcohol use disorder, and mood disturbances in individuals facing life-threatening illnesses. The research is controversial in part because recreational MDMA use has been associated with harmful effects among some users.

== Mechanism of action ==
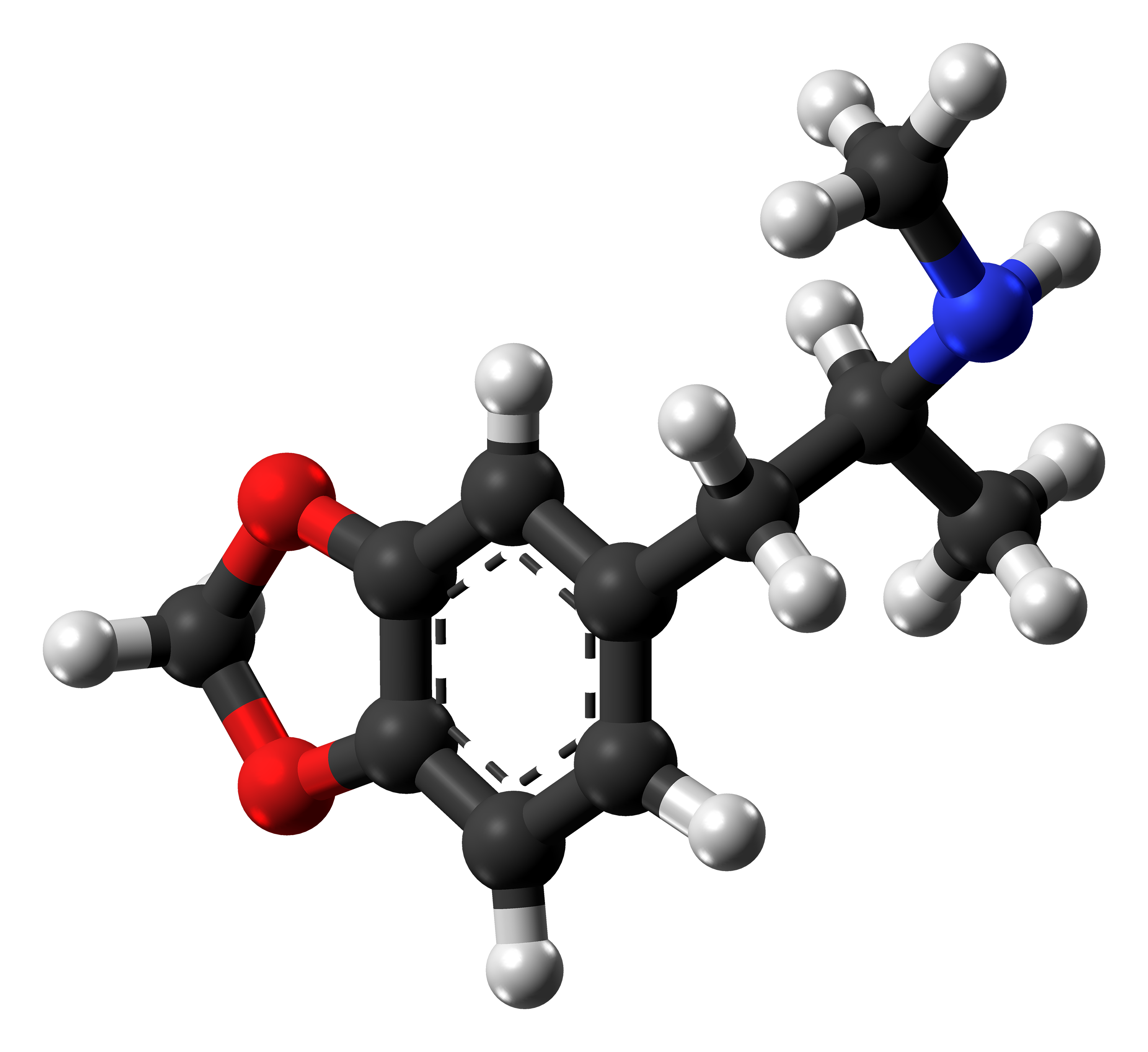
Chemical compound of MDMA.

PTSD inhibits a subject's ability to respond appropriately to trauma-related stimuli. The current model of PTSD proposes that it results from amplified and uncontrolled responses from the amygdala to trauma-specific cues. Oxytocin, which is increased by MDMA, has been found to increase trust and emotional awareness and reduce amygdala responses as well as reduce coupling of the amygdala to brainstem regions associated with autonomic and behavioral characteristics of fear. It has been proposed that these effects foster memory reconsolidation by allowing the patient to access the traumatic memory while feeling detached from the sense of imminent threat. MDMA is believed to create neuroplasticity, which can help break habits associated with OCD and addiction.

== History ==
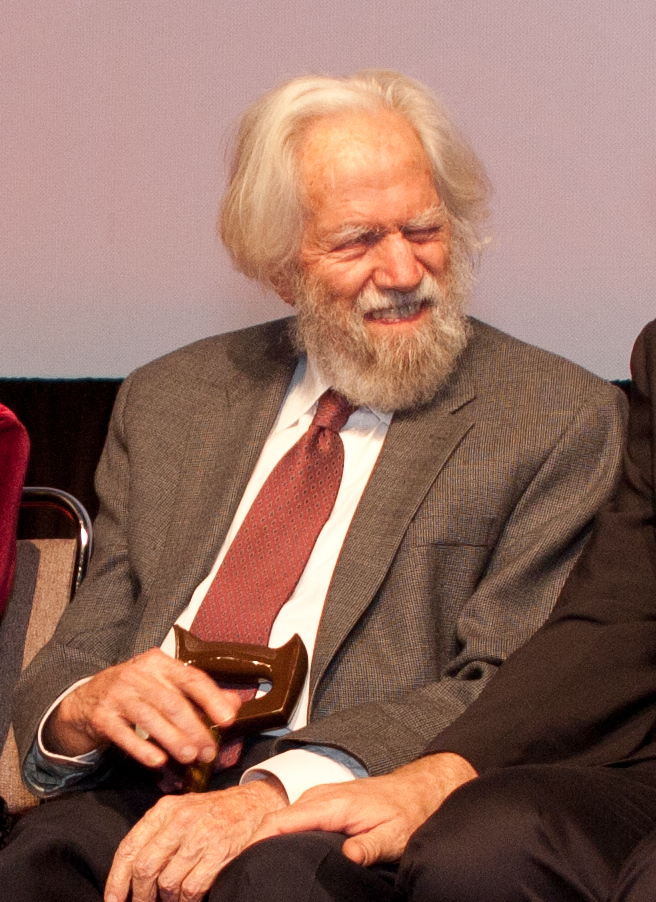
Alexander Shulgin, an American chemist who helped publish the first report on the effects of MDMA in humans.

Claudio Naranjo studied MDA and MMDA as part of entactogen-assisted psychotherapy in the 1960s and 1970s. Subsequently, Richard Yensen also studied MDA as part of entactogen-assisted psychotherapy at the Spring Grove Hospital Center under Stanislav Grof in the 1970s.

MDMA was first synthesized by the German pharmaceutical company Merck KGaA in 1912 as an intermediate in the synthesis of a potential blood clotting medication. Its psychoactive effects were not noted until 1976, when they were first described by Alexander Shulgin and David E. Nichols and colleagues. In the 1970s and early 1980s, MDMA emerged as a novel psychotherapeutic tool. The medicine demonstrated a unique ability to create feelings of empathy, openness, and reduced fear. These early explorations laid the groundwork for its later use in treating conditions such as post-traumatic stress disorder (PTSD). Shulgin was responsible for introducing the compound to a number of American psychotherapists in the late 1970s, for instance Leo Zeff. Zeff went on to train approximately 150 therapists and treat over 4,000 patients with MDMA-assisted psychotherapy.

Psychotherapists using MDMA for therapeutic purposes initially desired to keep its use within the clinical research community; however, the medication gained popularity in the club scene in the early 1980s. This eventually led to the drug being classified as a Schedule I controlled substance by the U.S. Drug Enforcement Administration (DEA) in 1986. The scheduling of MDMA made it illegal to manufacture, possess, or distribute, essentially ending the practice of MDMA-assisted psychotherapy in the United States. Despite this, MDMA continued to be used recreationally in the club and rave scene.

Switzerland continued to study the drug for use in individual, couple, and group therapies until 1993, when the Swiss Ministry of Health withdrew permission to use MDMA and LSD by psychiatrists due to concerns about a lack of research methodology. Over 100 patients in Switzerland with a variety of mental illnesses were treated with MDMA-assisted psychotherapy during this time frame.

== Legality ==
In 1986, MDMA was classed as a Schedule I drug by the United Nations according to its Convention on Psychotropic Substances of 1971 due to increasing rates of non-clinical use and police seizures, along with its high potential for abuse. MDMA has remained a Schedule I substance since 1986, and most research was stopped at that time. In response to this, researchers interested in MDMA for use in psychotherapy founded and funded the U.S.-based non-profit research organization, Multidisciplinary Association for Psychedelic Studies (MAPS). MAPS is now one of the leading organizations funding research on psychedelic and controlled substances.

=== Current legal status ===
The United States FDA and DEA granted approval for researching MDMA's efficacy as an adjunct to psychotherapy in 2004, and the first trial was carried out in 2011. In 2023, MAPS announced that it is compiling data from 18 different phase II and phase III studies with plans to file a New Drug Application with the FDA. MAPS hopes to receive FDA approval by the end of 2024.

In July 2023, Australia became the first country to approve the legal use of MDMA-assisted psychotherapy for the treatment of depression and PTSD.

== Controversy and safety ==
MDMA's effects vary across people and settings and include adverse outcomes. The drug causes neurotransmitter activation across the main neural pathways (e.g., serotonin, dopamine, noradrenaline) that can result in large mood swings. The memories that emerge under the influence of MDMA can evoke unwanted emotions. Side effects of MDMA use by recreational users include appetite fluctuations, food cravings, and disordered eating.

Once the effects of MDMA wear off, there is a "period of neurochemical depletion" that invokes anhedonia, lethargy, anger, depression, irritability, brooding, greater everyday stress, altered pain thresholds, changes in sleep, and bad dreams, especially in female participants. The symptoms are thought to be due to the depletion of serotonin, as a result of the large release of serotonin triggered by MDMA and have been called "neurotoxic in terms of causing serotonergic dysfunction."

There are also concerns surrounding "drug-dependent learning" — the theory that patients will return to the drug to access the state they were in when on the drug in therapy.

There were 92 MDMA-related deaths in England and Wales in 2018, up from 56 the year before, and 10,000 hospitalizations for MDMA-related illness/injury in 2011 in the United States. However, as of 2021, there have been no such cases reported for clinical settings.

Media reports and statements of academic authors have often transmitted the view of MDMA as a possible medicine or treatment rather than as an adjunct to psychotherapy. This approach, however, was criticized because it could lead people to believe that MDMA is an effective treatment alone, without concomitant psychotherapy. Some researchers have raised some concerns about the strength of the evidence, noting methodological limitations and difficulty separating the effects of MDMA from psychotherapy itself.

== See also ==
- Breakthrough therapy
- Convention on Psychotropic Substances
- Improving Access to Psychological Therapies
- List of investigational hallucinogens and entactogens
- List of psychotherapies
- Lykos Therapeutics
- Meaghan Buisson
- Psychedelic therapy
