= Claudio Naranjo =

Chilean psychotherapist (1932–2019)

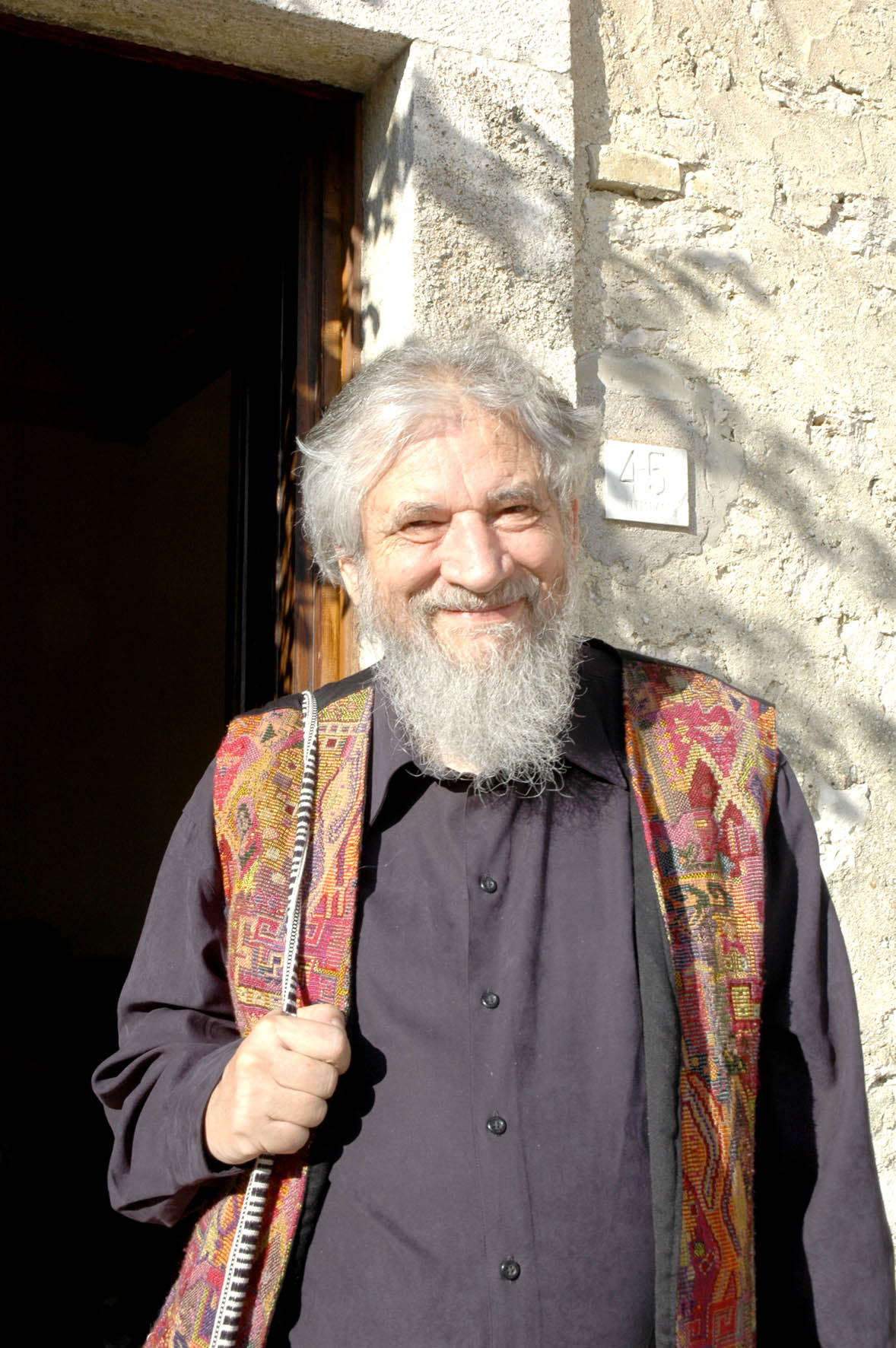
- Naranjo in 2007
- Born: Claudio Benjamín Naranjo Cohen; 24 November 1932; Valparaíso, Chile
- Died: 12 July 2019 (aged 86); Berkeley, California
- Occupations: Psychiatrist; writer
- Employer: University of Chile
- Spouses: Cecelia Bruna; Marilyn Sherwin; Suzana Stroke; Lillian Elena Baettig Rodríguez
- Children: Mathias Naranjo Bruna
- Parent(s): Fortunato Vincente Naranjo Chamonneaux; Julia Cohen
- Website: claudionaranjo.net

Claudio Benjamín Naranjo Cohen (24 November 1932 – 12 July 2019) was a Chilean psychiatrist who is considered a pioneer in integrating psychotherapy and the spiritual traditions. He was one of the three successors named by Fritz Perls (founder of Gestalt Therapy), a student of Oscar Ichazo (who originally developed the Enneagram of Personality), and a founder of the Seekers After Truth Institute. He was also an elder statesman of the US and global human potential movement and the spiritual renaissance of the late 20th century. Naranjo authored several books.

== Career ==
After graduating as a medical doctor in 1959, Naranjo was hired by the University of Chile. In 1962, Naranjo was at Harvard as a visiting Fulbright scholar at the Center for Studies of Personality and Emerson Hall, where he was a participant in Gordon Allport's Social Psychology Seminar and a student of Paul Tillich. He became Raymond Cattell's associate at the Institute of Personality and Ability Testing (IPAT) in 1963. After a brief return to his native country, he was invited to Berkeley, California, for a year and a half to participate in the activities of the Institute of Personality Assessment and Research (IPAR).

In the 1960s, Naranjo introduced ibogaine and harmaline into psychotherapy as a "fantasy enhancing drug."

Richard Evans Schultes allowed for Naranjo to make a special journey by canoe up the Amazon River to study yage with the South American Indians. He brought back samples of this drug and published the first scientific description of the effects of its active alkaloids.

The accidental death of his only son in 1970 marked a turning point in his life. Naranjo set off on a six-month pilgrimage under the guidance of Oscar Ichazo (1931-2020), the founder of the Arica School and the original developer of the Enneagram of Personality. Naranjo considered this spiritual retreat in the Atacama Desert near Arica, Chile, to be the true beginning of his spiritual experience, contemplative life and inner guidance.

According to John C. Lilly, Naranjo was "summarily ejected" from the Arica School. When leaving Arica, he retained tape recordings he had made of Ichazo's lectures, and despite having not received permission from Ichazo to teach Arica School material.

In 1990, the Arica School, whose materials Naranjo had not returned after his expulsion, considered taking legal action against Naranjo for the unauthorized use of Arica School materials and recordings. While Arica did not pursue legal action against Naranjo, due to his claim that he had never denied the origin of the material, it did pursue copyright claims against some of Naranjo's direct and indirect students for their failure to attribute Ichazo as the originator of the material. Many of these writers had falsely attributed Sufi or Jesuit origins for the material rather than acknowledging Ichazo as the originator of the theory. While these legal actions were mostly unsuccessful, the United States Court of Appeals ruled that Ichazo was the original author of the application of the enneagram figure to a theory of ego fixations.

Watkins Mind Body Spirit magazine listed Naranjo as one of the 100 Most Spiritually Influential Living People of 2012.

== Writings ==
- On the Psychology of Meditation. New York: Viking Press. 1971. ISBN 0-14-004420-5.
- The One Quest. New York: Viking Press. 1972. ISBN 0-89556-161-1.
- The Healing Journey: New Approaches to Consciousness. New York: Pantheon Books. 1974. ISBN 0-394-48826-1.
- Techniques of Gestalt Therapy. Gestalt Journal. 1980. ISBN 0-939266-00-8.
- How To Be: Meditation in Spirit and Practice. J. P. Tarcher. 1989. ISBN 0-87477-548-5.
- Ennea-type Structures: Self-Analysis for the Seeker. Gateways/IDHHB Inc. 1990. ISBN 0-89556-063-1.
- Gestalt Therapy. Gateways/IDHHB Inc. 1993. ISBN 0895560909.
- Character and Neurosis. Gateways/IDHHB Inc. 1994. ISBN 0-89556-066-6.
- The End of Patriarchy. Amber Lotus. 1994. ISBN 1-56937-065-6.
- Enneatypes and Psychotherapy. Hohm Press. 1995. ISBN 0-934252-47-5.
- Transformation Through Insight: Enneatypes in Life, Literature, and Clinical Practice. Hohm Press. 1997.
- The Divine Child and the Hero. Gateways/IDHHB Publishers. 1999. ISBN 0-89556-109-3.
- The Enneagram of Society. Gateways Books & Tapes. 2005. ISBN 0-89556-159-X.
- The Way of Silence and the Talking Cure. Blue Dolphin Pub. 2006. ISBN 1-57733-140-0.
- Healing Civilization: Bringing Personal Transformation into the Societal Realm through Education and the Integration of the Intra-Psychic Family. Rose Press. 2010. ISBN 978-0-89556-163-3.
- Changing Education to Change the World: A New Vision of Schooling. Gateways Books & Tapes. 2016. ISBN 978-0895561602.

== See also ==
- Richard Yensen
