= Just Lucas-Championnière =

French surgeon

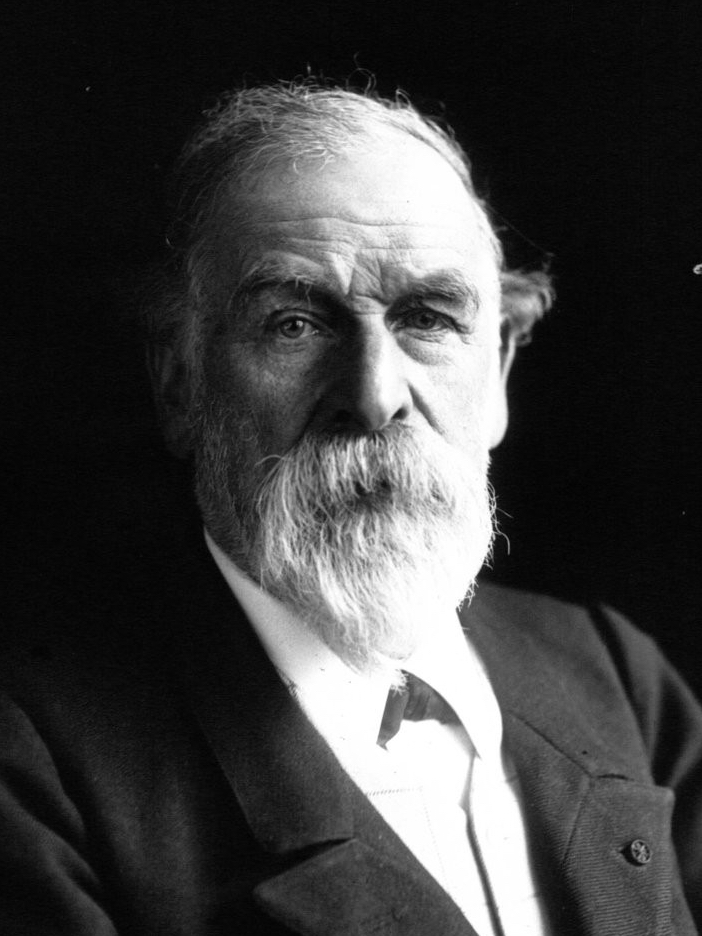
Just-Marie-Marcellin Lucas-Championnière (1912)

Just-Marie-Marcellin Lucas-Championnière (15 August 1843, in Avilly-Saint-Léonard – 22 October 1913, in Paris) was a French surgeon.

From 1860 he studied medicine in Paris, receiving his medical doctorate in 1870 and his agrégation in 1874. In 1874 he qualified as a hospital surgeon, and during his career was associated with the hospitals Cochin, Lariboisière, Tenon, Saint-Louis, Beaujon and Hôtel-Dieu in Paris. In 1906 he retired as a hospital surgeon.

While still a student, he traveled to Glasgow in order to study antisepsis under Joseph Lister. Subsequently, he introduced antiseptic surgery to France, publishing an important work on the subject in 1876 that was later translated into English. He also made significant contributions in his work involving bone fractures and hernias. In his research of trepanation, he showed that prehistoric flint tools could make trephine holes in a skull in less than 50 minutes.

In 1885 he became a member of the Académie de Médecine. For a number of years he was editor of the Journal de médecine et de chirurgie pratiques.

== Eponymy ==
- "Lucas-Championnière's disease": also known as pseudomembranous bronchitis.

== Writings ==
- Lymphatiques utérins et lymphangite utérine. Du rôle que joue la lymphangite dans les complications puerpérales et les maladies utérines, Asselin, Paris 1870, pp. 83
- De la fièvre traumatique. Thèse présentée au concours pour l'agrégation (section de chirurgie et d'accouchements) et soutenue à la Faculté de médecine de Paris le 19 juillet 1872, Baillière et fils, Paris 1872, pp. 176
- Chirurgie antiseptique. Principes, modes d'application et résultats du pansement de Lister, Baillière et fils, Paris 1876, pp. 156 (second French, 1880). Translated into English as: Antiseptic surgery; the principles, modes of application, and results of the Lister dressing, (1881).
- Étude historique et clinique sur la trépanation du crâne. La trépanation guidée par les localisations cérébrales, Delahaye, Paris 1878, pp. 149
- La cure radicale de la hernie inguinale, 1890 – The radical cure of inguinal hernia.
- Cure radicale des hernies, avec une étude statistique de deuxcent soixantequinze opérations, Rueff, Paris 1892, pp. 724 – Operative surgery, radical cure of hernias.
- Titres et travaux scientifiques, Imprimerie Daix Frères, Clermont 1894, pp. 122
- Traitement des fractures par le massage et la mobilisation, Rueff, Paris 1895, pp. 564 – Fracture treatment through massage and mobilization.
- "An Essay on Scientific Surgery, the Antiseptic Method of Lister in the Present and in the Future", Br Med J. 1902 Dec 13; 2(2189): 1819–1821
- "Le voyage des médecins français à Londres", Journal de médecine et de chirurgie pratiques, 75(21), 10 novembre 1904, pp. 801–809
- Hernies. Hygiéne et thérapeutique, Rueff, Paris 1905, pp. 328
- "New ideas on fractures, of the utmost importance to the medical profession and to the lay public in connexion with their responsibilities and possible legal liabilities", Br Med J. 1908 Mar 28; 1(2465): 725–728
- Theorie et practique de la chirurgie antiseptique. Ses progrès actuels, Steinheil, Paris 1908, pp. 59
- "An Address On the Modern Treatment of Fractures, Delivered at the Annual Meeting of the Cardiff Medical Society on June 4th", Br Med J. 1909 Jun 12; 1(2528): 1397–1400.
- Précis du traitement des fractures par le massage et la mobilisation, Steinheil, Paris 1910, pp. 267
- "Lord Lister (1827-1912)", Revue de Chirurgie, 32(4), 10 Avril 1912, pp. 530–543
- Les origines de la trépanation décompressive. Trépanation néolithique, trépanation pré-Colombienne, trépanation des Kabyles, trépanation traditionnelle, Steinheil, Paris 1912, pp. 131 – Neolithic trepanation, pre-Columbian trepanation, etc.
