= Beckley Foundation =

UK-based think tank and UN-accredited NGO

- Formation: 1998
- Type: ECOSOC Accredited NGO
- Legal status: Charitable trust
- Purpose: Scientific research and drug policy reform
- Location: Oxford, United Kingdom (International)
- Director: Amanda Feilding (Director and founder)
- Website: beckleyfoundation.org

The Beckley Foundation is a UK-based think tank and UN-accredited NGO, dedicated to activating global drug policy reform and initiating scientific research into psychoactive substances. The foundation is a charitable trust which collaborates with leading scientific and political institutions worldwide to design and develop research and global policy initiatives. It also investigates consciousness and its modulation from a multidisciplinary perspective, working in collaboration with scientists. The foundation is based at Beckley Park near Oxford, United Kingdom. It was founded in 1998, and is directed by Amanda Feilding, Countess of Wemyss.

== Background ==
Since its creation by Amanda Feilding in 1998, the Beckley Foundation has been at the forefront of global drug policy reform and scientific research into psychoactive substances.

The Beckley Foundation Scientific Programme initiates, designs and conducts research into the effects of psychoactive substances on the brain, in order to minimise their potential harms, learn more about consciousness and brain function, and discover and explore their therapeutic potential. Recent research includes collaborations with Dr Jordi Riba at Sant Pau Hospital on ayahuasca, Professor David Nutt at Imperial College on the effects of psychedelics on cerebral blood flow, Professor Valerie Curran at University College London on the effects of cannabis on the brain with a view to possible therapeutic applications and with Professor Roland R. Griffiths at Johns Hopkins University studying the effects of psilocybin in combating addiction.

The Beckley Foundation Policy Programme is dedicated to improving national and global drug policies, through research that increases understanding of the health, social and fiscal implications of drug policy, and the development of new evidence-based and rational approaches. It brings together country representatives, science and policy experts at international seminars in order to discuss alternative drug policy, and commissions and disseminates reports to open up and facilitate debate among policy-makers and the public.

In 2021, Feilding launched Beckley Retreats, a network of psychedelic retreat centers that provides integrated health programs utilizing psilocybin. It operates in jurisdictions where psilocybin is legal, including Jamaica and the Netherlands.

== Policy ==
=== The Beckley Foundation Drug Policy Programme ===
The Beckley Foundation Drug Policy Programme was created to promote rational discussion on delicate global arrangement issues. It intended to provide drug strategy advice to academics, substance misuse specialists, strategy developers, and the general public. Senior officials, top researchers, and practitioners evaluated the most recent data on the success of drug policies.

=== International Therapeutic Psilocybin Rescheduling Initiative (ITPRI) ===
In 2022, the Beckley Foundation joined in the launch of the International Therapeutic Psilocybin Rescheduling Initiative, a global coalition working to promote and secure a rescheduling of psilocybin under the 1971 Convention on Psychotropic Substances. The ITPRI is seeking a worldwide policy change in order to facilitate research into the therapeutic potential of the substance. Partners of the coalition include the Multidisciplinary Association for Psychedelic Studies (MAPS), Mind Medicine Australia, Drug Science and Open Foundation.

=== Roadmaps to Regulation: New Psychoactive Substances 2016 ===
To coincide with the introduction of the UK's Psychoactive Substances Act 2016 on 26 May 2016, Amanda Feilding released the report, "Roadmaps to Regulation: New Psychoactive Substances". The document surveys the complex and unique world of NPS production and distribution and suggests a harm reductive model for the legal regulation of this vast array of substances. The NPS report is part of wider family of forthcoming reports, "Roadmaps to Regulation: Cannabis, Psychedelics, MDMA and NPS".

=== Beckley Foundation Guatemala 2012–13 ===
On 3 July 2012 Beckley Foundation Guatemala was launched after the organisation had been asked to convene an international Board of Experts to write reports which would:

1. analyse the impact of the current drug prohibitionist policies;
2. propose a sophisticated range of alternative policy solutions for Guatemala.

The alternative drug policy solutions were presented to President Otto Pérez Molina by Amanda Feilding in January 2013 in this 'Paths for Reform' report. The suggestions include a proposal to investigate legalising the illicit opium poppy crop in order to produce pain-relieving medications for the Guatemalan people, an initiative that has been mentioned by President Pérez Molina during Davos 2013 and other official appearances

=== Public Letter 2011 ===
In 2011 an open letter from the Foundation was published in The Times and The Guardian calling for a new approach to drug policy. The letter opened by emphatically stating that the war on drugs has failed and calling for a new approach. Signatories of the letter now include the current Presidents of Colombia (Juan Manuel Santos) and Guatemala (Otto Pérez Molina), and former Presidents of the United States (Jimmy Carter), Mexico, Colombia and Switzerland, as well as Nobel Prize winners and numerous other world figures.

== Science ==
The Beckley Foundation is one of the few organisations in the world initiating, supporting, and directing scientific research investigating the effects of currently-controlled psychoactive substances. This ground-breaking research explores how substances such as cannabis, psychedelics, and MDMA act upon the human brain, using the latest developments in neuroscience and brain imaging technology. The purpose of the research is to increase our scientific understanding of consciousness itself, and to explore new avenues for the treatment of illnesses and the betterment of humankind. Over the last 18 years, the Programme has produced dozens of scientific articles published in influential peer-reviewed journals, and Amanda Feilding has spearheaded numerous collaborations. Collaborating partners include leading institutions such as Imperial College London, Sant Pau Hospital, University College London, King's College London, and Johns Hopkins University, and topics have covered:

- changes in brain structure, function, and blood supply in response to cannabis, LSD, psilocybin, ayahuasca/DMT, and MDMA;
- LSD, psilocybin, and MDMA-assisted psychotherapy for conditions such as depression, anxiety, addiction, and post-traumatic stress disorder (PTSD);
- cannabis and cannabinoids in the treatment of brain cancer;
- LSD in the treatment of cluster headaches; and
- cerebral circulation, cranial compliance, and their relationship to age-related cognitive decline.

== Latest findings from the Beckley Foundation scientific programme ==
=== Ayahuasca and Neurogenesis 2016 ===
A preliminary study conducted within the framework of the Beckley-Sant Pau Research Programme and in collaboration with the Spanish National Research Council found that harmine and tetrahydroharmine, the alkaloids present in highest amounts in ayahuasca, have potent neurogenic properties (the ability to create new brain cells). The addition of harmine and tetrahydroharmine to cultures containing neural stem cells dramatically increased their differentiation and maturation into neurons.

=== Psilocybin for Depression 2016 ===
Based on the Beckley/Imperial Research Programme's psilocybin study brain imaging results, in 2012, the Medical Research Council awarded funding to the programme for a clinical study investigating psilocybin in the treatment of depression. Results from the study, published in the Lancet Psychiatry Journal, showed that two doses of psilocybin lifted depression in all 12 volunteers for three weeks, and kept five of them depression free for three months.

=== LSD Revealed 2016 ===
On 13 April 2016, the Beckley/Imperial Research Programme released the world's first images of the human brain on LSD, collected as part of the first ever brain imaging study to examine the effects of LSD on the human brain. Programme co-directors Amanda Feilding and David Nutt, together with lead-investigator Robin Carhart-Harris, held a press conference at the Royal Society on 11 April 2016 to herald the publication of the paper.

== Beckley Canopy Therapeutics ==
News reports in 2018-2019 indicated that the Foundation had been retained by the Canadian cannabis producer Canopy Growth Corporation to conduct research as to the benefits of various strains of its products, particularly in treating pain, anxiety and drug addiction. One goal is to reduce dependence on opioids in treating cancer-related pain. The two formed Beckley Canopy Therapeutics in Oxford, to raise funds from investors for cannabinoid research and drug development.

Canopy Growth has been planning to export its products to the UK. The long-term intent of the partnership is to confirm the value of cannabis in specific conditions and to convince insurers to pay for medical cannabis when used accordingly. Mark Ware, Canopy's chief medical officer, said in an interview that Feilding's "ability to take a scientific look at what would otherwise be considered as controversial therapeutics makes her a very good partner".

Feilding's son, Cosmo Feilding Mellen, is the managing director of the partnership.

== Ongoing projects and collaborations ==
- The Beckley/Maastricht Microdosing Research Programme at Maastricht University in the Netherlands, carrying out research into the effects of LSD microdosing on humans, with a particular focus on mood, cognitive functions, and pain management. The first study, exploring the dose-response relationship in LSD-induced physiological and psychological effects, saw twenty-four healthy volunteers each receive single doses of 5, 10 and 20 micrograms of LSD, or a placebo.

== Past projects and collaborations ==
- The Beckley Foundation/Imperial College London Psychedelic Research Programme, investigating the effects of psilocybin and other psychedelic drugs on cerebral blood flow, and linking this with cognitive effects (for example, improved episodic memory recall and increased vividness of subjective experience under the influence of psilocybin).
- The Beckley Foundation Ethnobotanical Research Programme, investigating the effects and potential benefits of Ayahuasca and DMT, including a study involving ketanserin on evaluating the effects of glutamate release by DMT, a study investigating the association between brain plasticity and Ayahuasca, and a long-term study investigating the effect of Ayahuasca on personal development and health.
- A Beckley Foundation/Johns Hopkins University collaboration investigating the potential use of psychedelic drugs to treat addiction. A pilot study using psilocybin to treat nicotine addiction produced promising results, leading to a multi-site clinical trial in the USA, funded by NIH, in which the Foundation is not involved.
- A Beckley Foundation/King's College London collaboration with Dr Paul Morrison at the Institute of Psychiatry investigating the differing effects of delta-9-tetrahydrocannabinol (THC) and cannabidiol (CBD), two of the main cannabinoids found in cannabis that determine its subjective and cognitive effects. Cannabidiol is showing promise in inhibiting the psychosis-like effects of THC, and indicating great therapeutic potential.
- A Beckley Foundation/University College London collaboration with Professor Valerie Curran investigating medicinal uses of cannabis.
- A Beckley/Imperial Psychedelic Research Programme collaborative study on psychedelic microdosing.

== Recent Scientific Journal Publications ==
- Lebedev, Alexander V.; Lövdén, Martin; Rosenthal, Gidon; Feilding, Amanda; Nutt, David J.; Carhart-Harris, Robin L. (2015). "Finding the self by losing the self: Neural correlates of ego-dissolution under psilocybin". Human Brain Mapping. 36 (8): 3137–3153. doi:10.1002/hbm.22833. PMC 6869189. PMID 26010878.
- Carhart-Harris, R. L.; Kaelen, M.; Whalley, M. G.; Bolstridge, M.; Feilding, A.; Nutt, D. J. (2014). "LSD enhances suggestibility in healthy volunteers". Psychopharmacology. 232 (4): 785–794. doi:10.1007/s00213-014-3714-z. PMID 25242255. S2CID 15592659.
- Carhart-Harris, Robin L.; Leech, Robert; Hellyer, Peter J.; Shanahan, Murray; Feilding, Amanda; Tagliazucchi, Enzo; Chialvo, Dante R.; Nutt, David (2014). "The entropic brain: A theory of conscious states informed by neuroimaging research with psychedelic drugs". Frontiers in Human Neuroscience. 8: 20. doi:10.3389/fnhum.2014.00020. PMC 3909994. PMID 24550805.
- Carhart-Harris, R. L.; Wall, M. B.; Erritzoe, D.; Kaelen, M.; Ferguson, B.; De Meer, I.; Tanner, M.; Bloomfield, M.; Williams, T. M.; Bolstridge, M.; Stewart, L.; Morgan, C. J.; Newbould, R. D.; Feilding, A.; Curran, H. V.; Nutt, D. J. (2013). "The effect of acutely administered MDMA on subjective and BOLD-fMRI responses to favourite and worst autobiographical memories". The International Journal of Neuropsychopharmacology. 17 (4): 527–540. doi:10.1017/S1461145713001405. PMID 24345398.
- Muthukumaraswamy, S. D.; Carhart-Harris, R. L.; Moran, R. J.; Brookes, M. J.; Williams, T. M.; Errtizoe, D.; Sessa, B.; Papadopoulos, A.; Bolstridge, M.; Singh, K. D.; Feilding, A.; Friston, K. J.; Nutt, D. J. (2013). "Broadband Cortical Desynchronization Underlies the Human Psychedelic State". Journal of Neuroscience. 33 (38): 15171–15183. doi:10.1523/JNEUROSCI.2063-13.2013. PMC 6618409. PMID 24048847.
- Carhart-Harris, R. L.; Leech, R.; Williams, T. M.; Erritzoe, D.; Abbasi, N.; Bargiotas, T.; Hobden, P.; Sharp, D. J.; Evans, J.; Feilding, A.; Wise, R. G.; Nutt, D. J. (2018). "Implications for psychedelic-assisted psychotherapy: Functional magnetic resonance imaging study with psilocybin". British Journal of Psychiatry. 200 (3): 238–244. doi:10.1192/bjp.bp.111.103309. PMID 22282432.

== Beckley Foundation Press Publications ==
The Beckley Foundation Press was created to allow the publication of Drug Policy and Scientific material that was not being picked up by mainstream publishing houses due to the controversial nature of the material.

- LSD My Problem Child and Insights/Outlooks

Authors: Albert Hofmann. Translated by Jonathan Ott and Edited by Amanda Feilding - Publisher: The Beckley Foundation Press and Oxford University Press (2013). ISBN 978-0-19-963941-0, 248 pages

- Cannabis Policy: Moving Beyond Stalemate

Authors: Robin Room, Benedikt Fischer, Wayne Hall, Simon Lenton and Peter Reuter, Convened by Amanda Feilding - Publisher: The Beckley Foundation Press and Oxford University Press (2010). ISBN 978-0-19-958148-1

- The Pharmacology of LSD

Authors: Annelie Hintzen M.D. and Torsten Passie M.D., M.A. Paperback: App 200 pages - Publisher: The Beckley Foundation Press and Oxford University Press (June 2010) ISBN 978-0-19-958982-1

- Hoffmann's Elixir: LSD and the new Eleusis - Talks & Essays by Albert Hofmann and others

Edited by Amanda Feilding - Publisher: Beckley Foundation Press (2010) ISBN 978-0-9548054-9-4

- Non-Invasive Evaluation of Human Brain Fluid Dynamics and Skull Biomechanics in Relation to Cognitive Functioning

Authors: Yuri Moskalenko, Amanda Feilding and Peter Halvorson - Publisher: Beckley Foundation Press (2010) ISBN 978-1-907072-01-7

== Major Seminars ==
- "Drugs and the Brain", Magdalen College, Oxford, (2002).
- "The Role of Drugs in Society", Royal Society, (2003).
- "An Interdisciplinary Perspective on Alcohol and other Recreational Drugs", Cabinet Office, Admiralty Arch, (2003).
- "Global Drug Policy - Future Directions", Westminster Palace, (2004)
- "International Drug Policy Seminar 2005"), House of Lords, Westminster Palace, (2005). A three-day seminar including the Beckley/Foresight Seminar, reviewing the Foresight Report; the meeting of the International Consortium of NGOs, and the meeting of the International Network of Drug Policy Analysis, renamed International Society for the Study of Drug Policy (ISSDP). House of Lords, Westminster Palace
- "UNGASS and the Contribution of Civil Society" House of Lords, Westminster Palace, (2006)
- "The Global Cannabis Commission Report Launch & Assessing International Drug Control- Preparations for UNGASS" House of Lords, Westminster Palace, (2008)
- The Launch of the Global Initiative for Drug Policy Reform. Convened by the Beckley Foundation and launched with the All Party Parliamentary Group - Westminster Palace, (2011)

== See also ==
- Breaking the Taboo
- Heffter Research Institute
- Multidisciplinary Association for Psychedelic Studies
