= Self-surgery =

Performing a surgical procedure on oneself

Self-surgery is the act of performing a surgical procedure on oneself. It can be an act taken in extreme circumstances out of necessity, an attempt to avoid embarrassment, legal action, or financial costs, or a rare manifestation of a psychological disorder.

== Genitals ==
These surgeries are generally the least life-threatening. Sometimes people resort to self-surgery in the form of castration in an attempt to control their sexual urges, or due to gender dysphoria.

Boston Corbett, the soldier who killed Abraham Lincoln's assassin John Wilkes Booth, had performed self-surgery earlier in life. He castrated himself with a pair of scissors to avoid the temptation of prostitutes. Afterwards, he went to a prayer meeting and ate a meal before going for medical treatment.

== Abdominal ==
Successful abdominal self-surgery is extremely rare. A few well-publicized cases have found their way into the medical literature.

- On February 15, 1921, Evan O'Neill Kane carried out his own appendectomy in an attempt to prove the efficacy of local anesthesia for such operations. He is believed to have been the first surgeon to have done so. However, Kane previously performed appendectomies (on others) with local anesthetic. In 1932, he performed an even more risky self-operation of repairing his inguinal hernia at the age of 70.
- In August 1944, Jock McLaren, an Australian Army officer, conducted an appendectomy on himself without anaesthesia of any kind, using only a pocket knife and a mirror. He then proceeded to suture himself with what he had on hand - "jungle fibre". Though not qualified in human medicine or surgery, McLaren had considerable knowledge of veterinary medicine.
- On April 30, 1961, Leonid Rogozov removed his own infected appendix at the Soviet Novolazarevskaja Research Station in Antarctica, as he was the only physician on staff. The operation lasted one hour and 45 minutes. Rogozov later reported on the surgery in the Information Bulletin of the Soviet Antarctic Expedition.
- A student who had already performed a self-castration was the subject of a 1979 case report by Kalin. The student, some time after the self-castration, also attempted to reduce the activity of his adrenal glands with an injection of bovine serum albumin, luteinizing hormone-releasing hormone and Freund's adjuvant. When this produced an abscess at the injection site, the student resorted to self-surgery. His psychiatrist reported:

At four o'clock on the morning of his surgery, he disinfected his dormitory room with spray disinfectant and alcohol and draped an area with sheets that he had previously sterilized. For anesthesia, he took oral barbiturates. He also took hydrocortisone and prepared a canister of vaporized adrenalin, readying himself for a possible shock syndrome. He performed the procedure wearing sterile gloves and a surgical mask. Lying supine and looking into strategically placed mirrors to obtain an optimum view, he began by cleansing his abdomen with alcohol. The incision was made with a scalpel, exposure obtained by retractors, and the dissection carried out with surgical instruments. For local anesthesia, he injected lidocaine hydrochloride into each successive tissue layer during the opening. He controlled bleeding with locally applied gelatin powder, while sterilized cotton thread ligatures were used for the larger vessels. After eight hours he had had minimal blood loss but was unable to obtain adequate exposure to enter the retroperitoneal space because of the unexpected pain in retracting his liver. Exhausted, he bandaged his wound, cleaned up his room, and called the police for transport to the hospital because of a "rupture".

- In 2000, a Mexican woman, Inés Ramírez, was forced to resort to self-surgery – a "self-inflicted caesarean section" – because of lack of medical assistance during a difficult labour: "She took three small glasses of hard liquor and, using a kitchen knife, sliced her abdomen in 3 attempts ... cut the uterus itself longitudinally, and delivered a male infant. Both mother and child reportedly survived and are now well."

== Medically supervised ==
Jerri Nielsen was the sole physician on duty at the U.S. National Science Foundation Amundsen–Scott Antarctic research station in 1999 when she found a lump on her breast. She was forced to biopsy the lump herself. Her experience made international news and was the basis for her autobiography, Ice Bound. The lump was found to be cancerous, so she self-administered chemotherapeutic agents. She remained cancer-free for several years but died in 2009 after her cancer reappeared and spread to her brain.

== Self-trepanation ==
Trepanation involves drilling a hole in the skull. The most famous instances of self-trepanation are those of Amanda Feilding, Joey Mellen (Feilding's domestic partner), and Bart Huges (who influenced Mellen and Feilding). In 2023, Michael Raduga performed self-neurosurgery that included electrical stimulation of the motor cortex.

== Amputation of trapped limbs ==
- In 1993, Donald Wyman amputated his leg with his pocketknife after it was pinned by a tree.
- In 1993, Bill Jeracki was fishing near St. Mary's Glacier in Colorado, when a boulder pinned his left leg. Snow was forecast and without a jacket or pack, Jeracki did not believe he would survive the night. Fashioning a tourniquet out of his flannel shirt and using his bait knife, he cut his leg off at the knee joint, using hemostats from his fishing kit to clamp the bleeding arteries.
- In 2000, British Special Air Service veteran and adventurer, Sir Ranulph Fiennes received severe frostbite on his left hand in a failed solo North Pole expedition. After abandoning the trip and while waiting in England for further medical care, the pain of the necrotized tissue became unbearable. Fiennes retired to his garden shed and amputated his own digits with a power saw after clamping them in a vise. He survived and went on to other expeditions, including summiting Mount Everest and an abandoned Antarctic traverse.
- In 2002, Doug Goodale cut off one of his arms at the elbow in order to survive an accident at sea off the coast of Maine. After becoming caught in a winch while bringing up lobster traps, due to heavy weather he was thrown off the side of the boat, hanging only by his injured arm. He managed to climb back aboard, dislocating his shoulder in the process. Unable to free himself and heavily bleeding, he pulled out a knife and proceeded to cut through his right arm. Doug was then able to navigate back to shore to receive proper medical treatment. He recovered well after.
- In 2003, Aron Ralston was on a canyoneering trip in Bluejohn Canyon (near Moab, Utah), when a boulder fell and pinned his right forearm down, crushing it. First he tried to chip away the rock around his hand with his pocket knife, but gave up the attempt after two days. Next he tried to lift and move the boulder with a simple pulley system made with rope and gear, but that failed too. On the sixth day, which he did not expect to live to see upon falling asleep the night earlier, a dehydrated and delirious Ralston had a vision of himself as a one-armed man playing with his future son. Upon a subsequent fit of rage he discovered that he could bow his arm against the chockstone far enough to snap the radius and ulna bones. Using the dull blade on his multi-use tool, he cut the soft tissue around the break. He then used the tool's pliers to tear at the tougher tendons. He was careful not to sever the arteries before attaching an improvised tourniquet. After he cut the main bundle of nerves, leading to agonizing pain, he cut through the last piece of skin and was free. In bad physical shape, and having lost more than a litre of blood, he managed to rappel 70 feet down and hike another 8 miles, when he ran into a Dutch family who offered help and guided him to a rescue helicopter which happened to be nearby looking for Ralston and took him to a hospital. His story was dramatized in the film 127 Hours (2010).
- In 2003, an Australian coal miner trapped three kilometres underground by an overturned tractor cut off his own arm with a box-cutting knife. The 44-year-old man, who was not identified by police, was working late at the Hunter Valley mine when the tractor tipped over, crushing his arm and trapping him.

== Mouth ==
During 1992-1993 Vendée Globe, a solo race around the world, sailor Bertrand de Broc who had been hit full in the face by a rope, had to sew his tongue himself after a doctor telexed instructions on how to sew stitches into the wound.

== See also ==
- Self-inflicted caesarean section
- Self-medication
