= Jamshidi =

Jamshidi (Persian: جمشیدی) is a surname. Notable people with the surname include:

== People ==
- Alireza Jamshidi, Iranian Islamist
- Khosrow Jamshidi, Iranian hematologist who invented the Jamshidi needle
- Pejman Jamshidi, Iranian footballer

== Other uses ==
- Jamshidi (tribe), a sub-tribe of the Aymaq in western Afghanistan
- Jamshidi needle, a needle for performing bone marrow biopsy

== See also ==
- Aymāq
