= Self-inflicted wound =

A self-inflicted wound (SIW) or self-inflicted injury (SII) is a physical injury done to oneself. This may occur in contexts including:

- Suicide or suicide attempt
- Self-harm (non-suicidal self-injury)
- As a result of an organic brain syndrome
- Pursuit of an ulterior motive, including:
  - To avoid military service
- Self-surgery, including:
  - Autoenucleation (often overlapping with self-harm)
  - Self-inflicted caesarean section
  - Self-castration
- Body modification, including for ritual purposes
- Autoeroticism

While some sources use the terms to include accidental injury, others cast "self-inflicted" in opposition to "accidental".

The term is also used metaphorically, akin to "shooting oneself in the foot".
