= Trepan =

Trepan may refer to:

- Trepanning, the medical procedure
- Trepan (drill bit), a type of drill bit
- Trepan (grape), another name for the Spanish wine grape Trepat
- Trepan Records, a record label

== See also ==
- Trepanation (disambiguation)
- Trepang (disambiguation)
- Trephine
