= Heartbeat in the Brain =

1970 British film by Amanda Feilding

- Screenshots from the film
- Directed by: Amanda Feilding
- Produced by: Amanda Feilding, Joseph Mellen
- Starring: Amanda Feilding
- Narrated by: Amanda Feilding
- Release date: 1970
- Country: United Kingdom
- Language: English
- Budget: Unknown

Heartbeat in the Brain is a 1970 documentary film produced and directed by Amanda Feilding, an advocate of trepanation. It was filmed by Joseph Mellen.

== Summary ==
In the film, Feilding, a 27-year-old student at the time, drills a hole in her forehead with a dentist's drill. In the documentary, surgical scenes alternate with motion studies of Feilding's pet pigeon Birdie.

== Release and rediscovery ==
In 1978, Feilding screened the movie at the Suydam Gallery in New York. More than one audience member fainted during the climax.

The 1998 documentary A Hole in the Head contains footage from Heartbeat in the Brain.

The documentary, long believed to be lost, was publicly screened at the Institute of Contemporary Arts, London on 28 April 2011.
