= Trepanation (disambiguation) =

Trepanning is a form of surgery in which a hole is bored into the skull.

Trepanation or Trepanning may also refer to:

- Trepanning (manufacturing), a type of drilling designed for large holes in metal and rock workpieces
- Trepanation (album), by American Head Charge
- Trepanation, a technique used by bomb disposal units

== See also ==
- Trepan (disambiguation)
