= Trepang =

Trepang may refer to:

- A marine invertebrate harvested by trepanging, thus:
  - A common name for species of the holothuroidea (sea cucumber) class of animals
- Trepang (SS-412), a World War II submarine sunk in 1967
- Trepang (SSN-674), a submarine commissioned from 1970 to 1999
- Trepang2, a 2023 video game

== See also ==
- Trepan (disambiguation)
