= Beckley Park =

16th-century stately home near the village of Beckley in Oxfordshire, England

Coordinates: 51.8034°N 1.1643°W

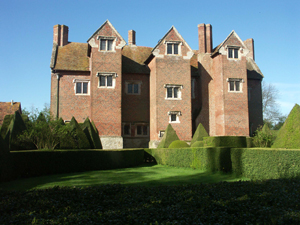
Beckley Park, Oxfordshire

Beckley Park in the 1930s

Beckley Park is an English country house located near the village of Beckley, in Oxfordshire, England.

It was built in 1540 by Lord Williams of Thame, who also built a great house at Rycote, a few miles away. It was originally built as a lodge for use when the lord and a party hunted the great park.

It was the home of the late Amanda Feilding and it is the main headquarters of her Beckley Foundation which is doing research on the benefits of certain types of drugs, including cannabis and LSD. Feilding was married to James Charteris, 13th Earl of Wemyss, who is the owner of Stanway House in Gloucestershire and Gosford House in Scotland.

The Tudor brick edifice of the house is encircled by three moats which attest to the place's importance in former days. Beckley Park remained with the descendants of Lord Williams, the Earls of Abingdon, until 1920 when it was bought by Clotilde Kate Feilding, grandmother of Amanda Feilding, Lady Neidpath. It is situated between Beckley and Otmoor just outside Oxford.

The house is closed to the public, although it is regularly used for photo shoots and as a film location.

== History ==
Beckley Park was first enclosed in the 12th century from land held by Roger d'Ivry and later by Richard, Duke of Cornwall, who built a palace on Beckley Hill around which grew the village. He then limited the area of the park by a stone wall, partly extant, and stocked with deer. The hunting lodge was built on a Saxon site at this spot in the centre of the enclosure. First mentioned in 1347, the lodge was re-built in 1376 for King Edward III; the moats, hall buttresses date from the late 14th century. The park was crown property and its keepers appointed by the King for two centuries: notable families were the Hamdens, the Verneys; and Sir John, later Lord Williams of Thame who in 1550 held the park by grant, rebuilt the lodge to probably the present structure.

The park and lodge passed to the Norreys family, whose head in the late 17th century was created Earl of Abingdon. In the early 17th Century also a family of Ledwells lived there for generations. The Estate was sold by the son of the seventh Earl of Abingdon to the grandmother of the present owner in 1920. (HM Land Registry, Gloucester Office: Title Number ON145383 Beckley Park: The Title Register refers on Page 7 to a conveyance dated 18 November 1920 made between 1. The Right Hon Vere Frederick Viscount Bertie of Thame (grandson of the Earl of Abingdon), 2. The Rev Hon Alberic Edward Bertie & others and 3. Clotilde Kate Feilding.)

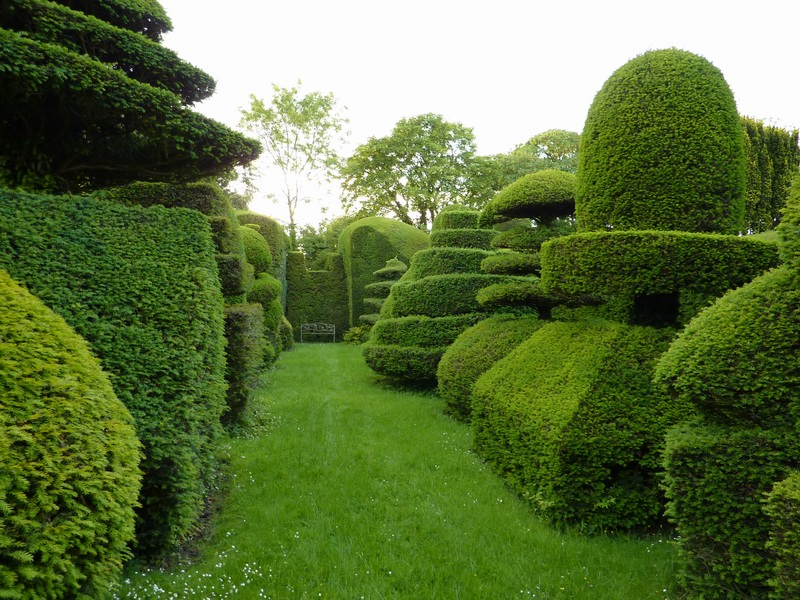
Beckley Park topiary (2009)

The house remains unaltered and 'unmodernised' to an unusual extent. It has been a Grade I listed building (with some Grade II listed areas) of historic interest since 1984 (List Entry Number: 1001087). The listing offers this summary:

Formal early C20 gardens surrounding a mid C16 hunting lodge, incorporating the remains of three concentric medieval moats, formerly enclosing a medieval royal hunting lodge. The moats were probably part of medieval garden features, which possibly extended into the wider landscape of the surrounding former deer park.

The Listing document provides a summary of the history of the property including this coverage of the early years:

Beckley Park, known as Lower Park Farm in the C19 and early C20, is first recorded in 1175-6, having been for some time part of the capital seat of the Honour of St Valery, that is, the main property of the St Valery family. In the 1190s the park was refurbished and enclosed by a stone wall. In 1227, the park having come into the hands of the Crown, Henry III granted the manor and park to his brother the Earl of Cornwall who restocked the park with deer and constructed a deer leap. The park subsequently passed through the hands of several members of the Royal Family during the Middle Ages. Beckley Park formed the site of the park hunting lodge, situated at the centre of the c 300ha park, probably initially built in the early C13 and by 1300 being used as a centre for royal hunting parties and other entertainments. The site contained a hall, chambers, chapel, kitchen and stables, together with a garden and vineyard, all possibly contained within a moat. The lodge was rebuilt on a more lavish scale for Edward II over several years from 1373, and included an outer moat, planted around its outer perimeter with a hedge, with two gates and a porter's lodge. This work is assumed to have resulted in the present triple moats (VCH 1957; Taylor 1996).

After numerous years in ruin, the property was bought on November 18, 1920, by the first international woman architect Clotilde Kate Feilding (1874-1937) and restored by Clotilde and her husband, Percy. Clotilde was the daughter of Henry Bennet Brewster of the Palazzo Mattei in Rome and the Baroness Julia von Stockhausen. Among other work, Clotilde Brewster, as she was known then, was the architect of two palaces in Rome: the Palazzo Soderini and the Palazzo Frankenstein. Percy Henry Feilding (1867-1929) was the son of Sir Percy Robert Basil Feilding.

== Beckley Park today ==
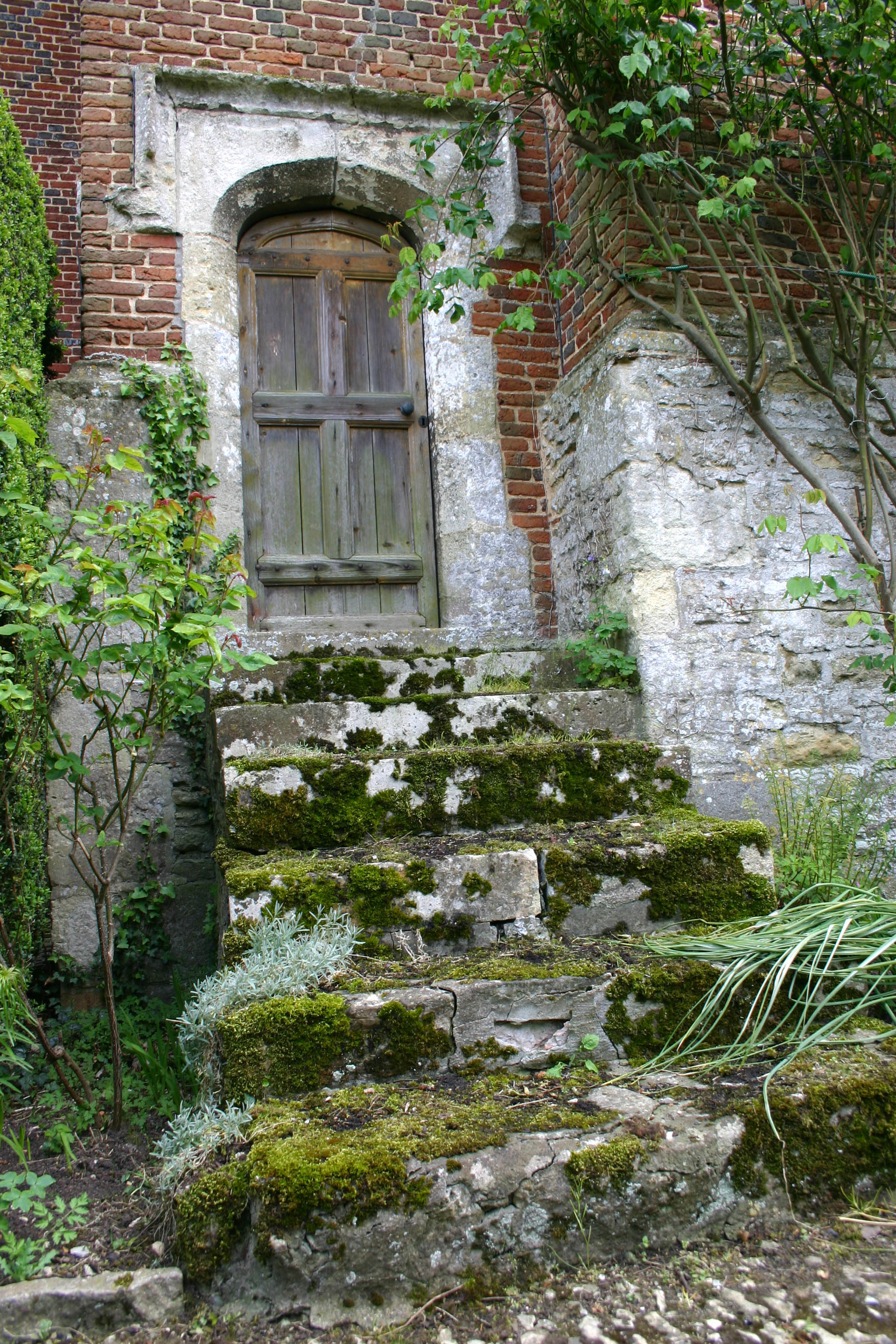
Entrance featured in Harry Potter and the Goblet of Fire

In 2005 Beckley Park was used as the set for one of the opening scenes of Harry Potter and the Goblet of Fire in which Frank Bryce runs through the garden to The Riddle House. Photographers who have worked here include Mario Testino.

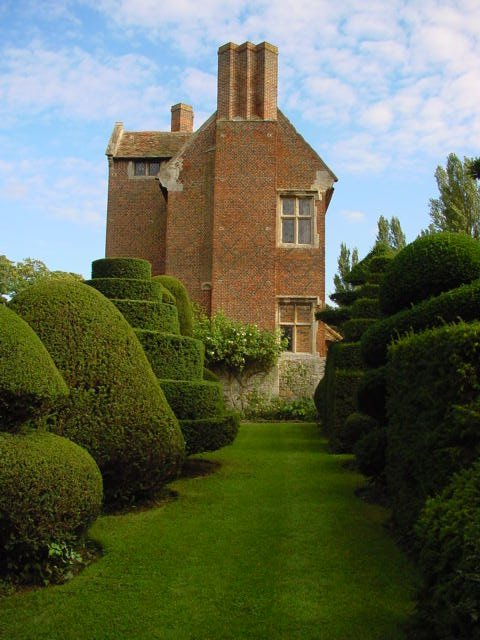
Yew Garden

The Listing provides this summary of the principal building in 1998.

Built of dark red brick diapered with black headers and stone dressings, it is of two storeys plus cellars and attics. It is a narrow house, only one room thick, with the most prominent features being the three full-height, projecting gabled towers on the east, garden front, overlooking the former central moated island. The central tower contains the newel stair up the full height of the house, whilst the flanking towers contain garderobe flues. Each of the towers contains first-floor and attic-level windows overlooking the garden. Low extensions have been added to the south side of the house during the C20, that adjacent to the house enclosing a door at the south end of the east front which formerly led directly into the garden. A further door at the bottom of the central staircase tower, and offset from its centre, gives access to the garden. Both doors approached the garden via flights of stone steps.
