= Trepanation in Mesoamerica =

Type of procedure on the skull

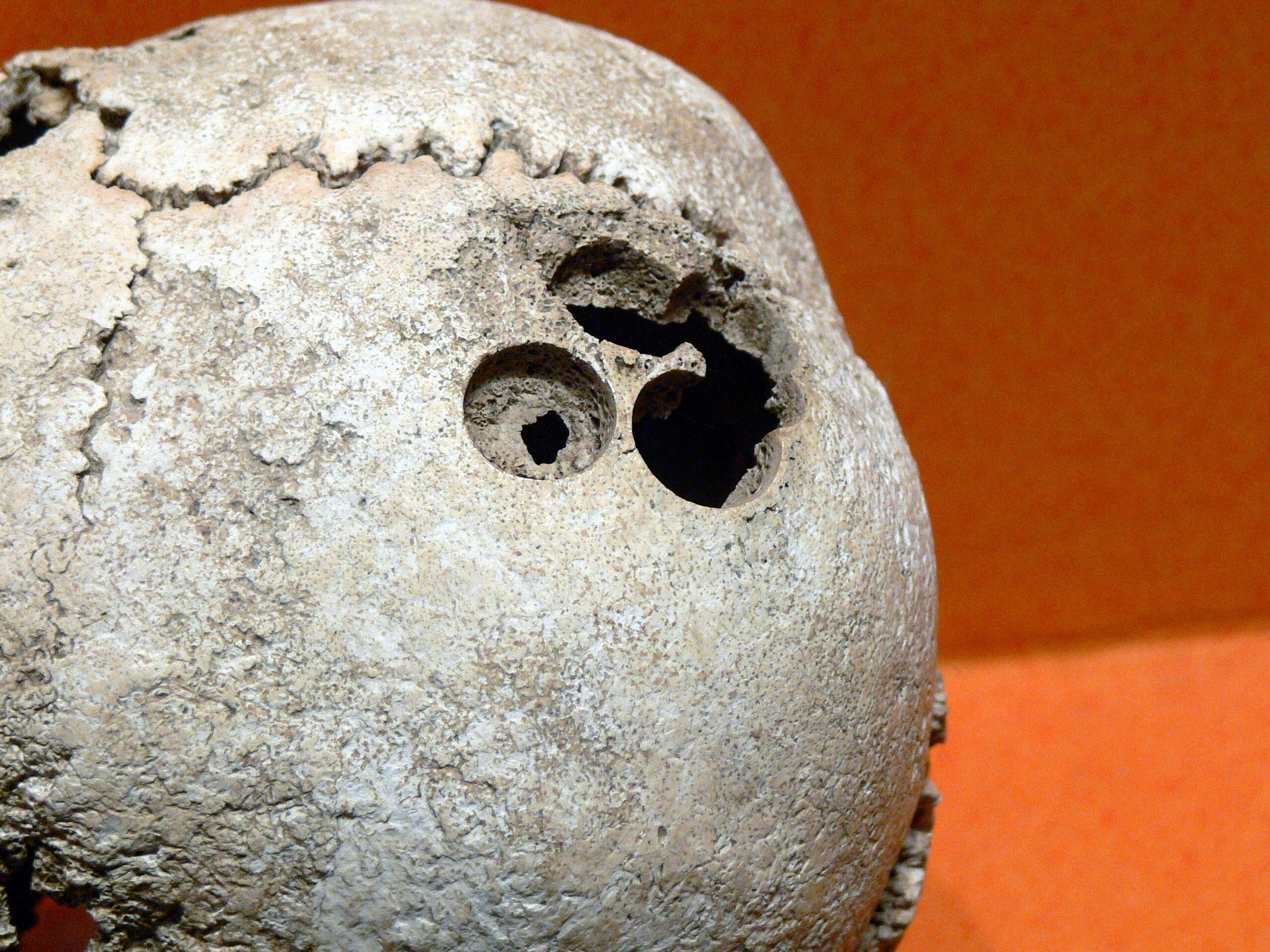
Human skull with evidence of trepanation found at Monte Albán in Oaxaca, Mexico.

Trepanation in Mesoamerica has been practised by a number of pre-Columbian cultures in the Mesoamerican region, dating from at least the mid-Preclassic era (ca. 1500 BCE), and continuing up to the late Postclassic, or ca. 1200 CE.

Trepanation involves an intentional and planned operation to open or bore into the skull on a live subject, using tools specifically designed for the purpose. This can be accomplished by several techniques, such as drilling, incising and abrasion, or some combination of these. The purpose of such operations ranges from the medicinal (intended to relieve pressure or address a number of other ailments) to the ritualised and experimental.

In pre-Columbian Mesoamerica, evidence for the practice of trepanation and an assortment of other cranial deformation techniques comes from a variety of sources, including physical cranial remains of pre-Columbian burials, allusions in iconographic artworks and reports from the post-conquest period.

== Overview ==
Trepanation has been practised by a variety of historical cultures and societies across the globe, with evidence for it dating back to the Neolithic period, and its use has continued up to the present era under certain limited circumstances by a few cultures. If the patient manages to survive the procedure, the bone begins to slowly grow back from the rim of the hole towards the center. This new bone growth is measurably thinner than the undamaged bone at the rim, providing scientists examining a trepanned skull with a means to establishing whether or not the person lived beyond the operation. Among New World societies, trepanation is most commonly found in the Andean civilizations such as the Inca, where it is frequently associated with pre-existing cranial damage, indicating that it had a use as a reasonably-successful medical procedure— by one estimate, more than 70% of the patients survived the operation. In 2008, anthropologists have discovered evidence which suggests that survival rates may have been as high as 80 to 90 percent.

Its prevalence among Mesoamerican civilizations is much lower, at least judging from the comparatively few trepanned crania which have been uncovered. The archaeological record is further complicated by the practice of skull mutilation and modification which was carried out after the death of the subject, in order to fashion "trophy skulls" and the like, of captives and enemies. This was a reasonably widespread tradition, illustrated in pre-Columbian art which on occasion depicts rulers adorned with or carrying the modified skulls of their defeated enemies, or of the ritualistic display of sacrificial victims. Several Mesoamerican cultures used a skull-rack (known by its Nahuatl term, tzompantli) on which skulls were impaled in rows or columns of wooden stakes.

Even so, some evidence of genuine trepanation in Mesoamerica (i.e., where the subject was living) has been recovered.

== Survey ==
=== Early colonial reports ===
Sixteenth-century Spanish colonial accounts like those of Bernardino de Sahagún and Bishop Diego de Landa contain references to the use of trepanation techniques among Mesoamericans to alleviate pain, such as for persistent headaches and that which results from the practice of deliberately deforming the cranium (for aesthetic purposes) by using compression boards and other methods.

=== Central Mexico and Oaxaca ===
The earliest archaeological survey published of trepanned crania was a late 19th-century study of several specimens recovered from the Tarahumara mountains by the Norwegian ethnographer Carl Lumholtz. Later studies documented cases identified from a range of sites in Oaxaca and central Mexico, such as Tilantongo, Oaxaca and the major Zapotec site of Monte Albán. Two specimens from the Tlatilco civilization's homelands (which flourished around 1400 BCE) indicate the practice has a lengthy tradition, although the cultural provenance of these particular specimens has been disputed.

A 1999 study of seven trepanned crania from Monte Albán showed a combination of single and multiple elliptical holes drilled or worn into the cranial cap, performed exclusively on the upper Parietal bones. The sample crania were from both male and female adults, and evidence of healing around the perforations suggested that about half had survived the operation. Most of the skulls in the study showed signs of earlier cranial damage, indicating (as with the Andean examples) that the operations were an attempt to repair or alleviate this head-trauma.

From these analyses, it appears that a technique of straightforward abrasion was employed in the earliest-dated finds, to be combined later on with drilling and incision techniques.

Crania recovered from Cholula show another form of trepanation ("supra-inial lesion"), where a depression has been worn into the back of the skull, without however substantially perforating it.

=== Maya region and Yucatán Peninsula ===
Specimens identified from the Maya civilization region of southern Mexico, Guatemala and the Yucatán Peninsula show no evidence of the drilling or cutting techniques found in central and highland Mexico. Instead, the pre-Columbian Maya seemed to have utilised an abrasive technique which ground away at the back of the skull, thinning the bone and sometimes perforating it, similar to the examples from Cholula. Many of the skulls from the Maya region date from the Postclassic period (ca. 950–1400), and include specimens found at Palenque in Chiapas and recovered from the Sacred Cenote at the prominent Postclassic site of Chichen Itza in northern Yucatán.

The practice of deliberate cranial deformation or flattening is well documented among the pre-Columbian Maya peoples and is evidenced from the Preclassic era onwards. By the use of cradleboards and other compression techniques applied to the growing skull from infancy, a variety of head-shapes were fashioned, with different regions and time-periods exhibiting a difference in style and ideal. The practice was applied to both males and females and was not thought to be particularly associated with class or social standing. It was widely adopted however, to the point where one particular study which examined over 1,500 skulls drawn from across the Maya region determined that at least 88% exhibited some form of intentional cranial deformation. These practices have no known therapeutic value although they may have been intertwined with the expression of Maya cultural values, beliefs and identity. It is argued by some scholars in the field such as Vera Tiesler, that trepanation among the Maya was also imbued with a culturally significant meaning apart from any medical benefit.
