= Clotilde Kate Brewster =

French-born architect

- Born: 1874; Fontainbleau, France
- Died: 1937 (aged 62–63)
- Occupation: Architect
- Parents: Henry Brewster (father); Julia von Stockhausen (mother)

Clotilde Kate Brewster (1874–1937) was a French-born architect with an extensive career in Italy, England, France, and Russia. Brewster's work spans castles, chapels, fountains, and many renovations and additions to existing buildings all over Europe in the Edwardian era.

== Early years ==
Brewster was born in Fontainebleau, France, in 1874. Her father was Henry Bennet Brewster (H.B.), a philosopher and writer. Henry Brewster's father was a dental surgeon in New York who went on to work for the European elite, and he was eventually knighted by Nicholas I Tsar of Russia in 1842. Following his death, he left a large inheritance for Henry Brewster, allowing Clotilde Brewster's father to sustain his family while pursuing a literary career. Brewster's mother was born Julia von Stockhausen, the daughter of a Hanoverian diplomat, Bodo von Stockhausen. The Brewsters lived isolated in Florence, Italy for 10 years to be immersed in theology, nature, and history. During this time, Clotilde Brewster and her brother Christopher were born. In 1880 the family moved to an estate, Château de Avignônet but by 1883, it had burned down completely. In 1885, Brewster's parents divorced. These events are considered to be the inspiration for Brewster's motivation to rebuild the house and her subsequent architectural career.

== Life and career ==
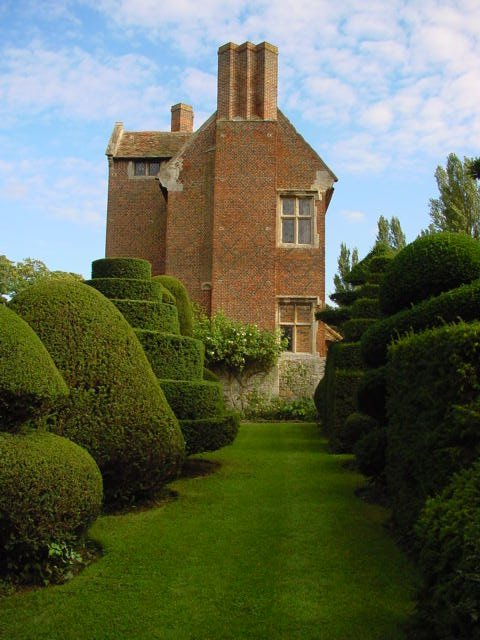
Beckley Park, located in England. Building renovations completed by Brewster in 1926.

Brewster began her career as a mentee under Swiss architect Emanuel La Roche. At 18 she displayed work at the World's Columbian Exposition in Chicago. It was difficult to practice architecture at the time, and Brewster was unable to get a job, so she studied mathematics at Cambridge for a year. The next summer she got an internship under notable architect Reginald Bloomfield. Brewster began to receive commissions, including a mausoleum in Menton, France, a villa in Rome, and a Municipal Palazzo. She also created plans for an unbuilt Italian National Theatre. Brewster's work varies greatly from her mentor, Bloomfield. She explored the minimal themes of Early Modernism, shying away from ornament and only including the necessities.

While working under Bloomfield, Brewster met Percy Feilding, who she would go on to marry. The two worked on several projects including the Pekes Manor restoration which was completed in 1911. Brewster's final project was Beckley Park, a renovation completed in 1926, three years before Percy Feilding's death.

Later in life Brewster became a recluse, and she suffered through an addiction to alcohol and cigarettes until her death in 1937.
