= One Retreats =

Psychedelic treatment centre in Jamaica

- Type: Private
- Industry: Psilocybin therapy
- Founded: June 2023 Negril, Jamaica
- Headquarters: Negril, Jamaica
- Owner: Rose Hill
- Website: oneretreatsjamaica.com

One Retreats is a psychedelic retreat center located in Negril, Jamaica. It is among several retreat centers in Jamaica that provide psilocybin-assisted retreat programs as the psilocybin mushrooms are legal in Jamaica.

The retreat center is operated by Jamaican company Rose Hill which asserts itself as world's largest legal producer of psilocybin mushrooms. The retreats participants have also included participants from the United States Navy SEALs veterans community. According to VICE News, the company was also behind the first legal export of psilocybin mushrooms from Jamaica to Canada which was possible due to a legal loophole.

== See also ==
- Negril
