= Evolute Institute =

Private organization in the Netherlands

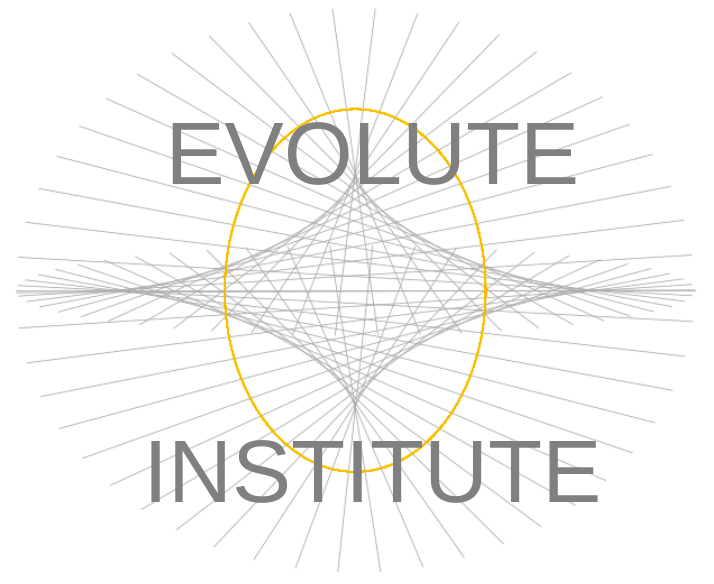
Logo of Evolute Institute

The Evolute Institute is a private organization based in the Almere, Netherlands, that offers programs combining legal psychedelic retreats (notably psilocybin-containing truffles), with professional coaching and integration practices. According to media reports, the programs are aimed at personal and leadership development and have primarily attracted entrepreneurs and executives.

Journalistic coverage has described the institute as part of a broader trend examining the use of altered states of consciousness in leadership training. Its activities have been reported in European media outlets, including Manager Magazin, Der Spiegel, Neue Zürcher Zeitung (NZZ), ZDF, and Der Tagesspiegel.

== History and founding ==
The Evolute Institute was founded in July 2022 by Dr. Dmitrij Achelrod and Christopher Kabakis. They established the organization in the Netherlands where psilocybin truffles (a form of psychedelic fungi) can be legally used.

== Leadership and core team ==
According to Manager Magazin, both founders, Christopher Kabakis and Dmitrij Achelrod, completed business studies, followed by master's degrees in leadership and health policy, respectively, and pursued doctoral paths. The article further states that Dmitrij Achelrod received a scholarship to Oxford, earned a doctorate, worked in healthcare companies and startups, and is employed full-time at a young AI software company.

While Christopher Kabakis is an Affiliate Professor at ESCP Business School (Berlin) in the Department of Innovation and Entrepreneurship, he has also worked in executive communication, public speaking & speaker coaching, and leadership coaching for organizations since 2014.

The Evolute Institute’s team includes facilitators with backgrounds in clinical psychology, somatic therapy, executive coaching, hospice work, and medical professionals who oversee participant screenings and health during retreats.

Among the team is Patrick Liebl, a lead facilitator for psychedelic-assisted retreats, specializes in psychedelic integration, retreat facilitation, and end-of-life accompaniment and is a co-founder of OMDB, an organization focused on creating spaces for grief and loss.

== Philosophy and methodology ==
According to coverage, Evolute’s programs address themes including self-leadership, self-awareness, emotional intelligence, and purpose. The institute’s approach is reported to incorporate frameworks like the Inner Development Goals (IDGs), which complement the UN Sustainable Development Goals.

Published sources state that Evolute’s methodology incorporates elements of adult developmental theory, including vertical development, and includes activities described as focusing on mindset and consciousness. Media coverage has reported that the organization operates within a legal framework, with professional oversight that includes medical screenings, supervision during sessions, informed consent from participants, and stated adherence to ethical guidelines.

Some experts and regulatory bodies continue to debate the appropriateness and safety of psychedelic use outside clinical settings, particularly for purposes of personal development. Evolute has not been subject to public controversies, but its work exists within this broader discussion.

== Public perception and media analysis ==
Since 2023, Evolute has been the subject of coverage in media outlets reporting on the intersection of psychedelics, business, and personal growth. In 2023, Der Spiegel reported on the growing interest in psychedelic-assisted coaching for executives, portraying Evolute as one of the organizations offering such programs.

In 2024, the Swiss newspaper Neue Zürcher Zeitung (NZZ) published a feature on executives participating in guided psychedelic retreats for professional growth. The article included descriptions of Evolute’s programs and participant testimonials. The same year, the German public broadcaster ZDF featured Evolute in its documentary "Die Welt der Coaches" ("The World of Coaches"). The documentary included Evolute’s work as part of a broader trend in personal and professional development.

In 2025, Der Tagesspiegel covered the Evolute Institute in an article about the use of psychedelics among managers. The article noted the institute's focus on professionals and leaders and described its screening and aftercare processes. In August 2025, the German business magazine Manager Magazin profiled the Evolute Institute, a company that facilitates psilocybin retreats in the Netherlands. The article described the institute's participants as executives and leaders seeking to address burnout and personal dissatisfaction. It detailed the company's structured program, which includes medical screenings and post-retreat follow-up, and contrasted this approach with critical views from German psychiatry experts who caution against psychedelic use outside of a strictly medical context.

The Evolute Institute’s team have also participated as speakers in industry events such as the Ada Lovelace Festival 2023 and 2024 and the Second German Psychedelika Summit 2025.

== Safety standards and dosing ==
Evolute Institute authored the ''Psilocybin Retreat Standards: An Evidence-Informed Evaluation Framework'' (PREF), a publicly available guide for evaluating psilocybin retreat providers in the Netherlands. The framework is published under an open license that allows it to be shared and adapted, including by other organisations, provided the source is credited, and the institute invites researchers, clinicians and practitioners to propose corrections and additions.

For its own retreats, the institute states that it calculates each participant's dose from the measured psilocybin content of the specific truffle batch used, expressed in milligrams of psilocybin. It measures this on site using a colorimetric test developed at the Institute of Pharmacy of Friedrich Schiller University Jena, an approach meant to account for the variation in psilocybin content that laboratory studies have found between batches and strains of psilocybin-containing fungi.
