= Amanda Feilding =

English drug policy activist (1943–2025)

- Feilding in 2011
- Born: Amanda Claire Marian Feilding; 30 January 1943; Beckley Park, Oxfordshire, England
- Died: 22 May 2025 (aged 82); Beckley Park, Oxfordshire, England
- Other name: Lady Neidpath
- Occupation: Drug policy reformer; Neuroscience researcher
- Known for: Beckley Foundation
- Notable work: Heartbeat in the Brain
- Title: Countess of Wemyss and March (since 2008)
- Spouse: James Charteris, 13th Earl of Wemyss (m. 1995)
- Children: 2 sons (with Joseph Mellen)

Amanda Claire Marian Charteris, Countess of Wemyss and March (née Feilding; 30 January 1943 – 22 May 2025) was an English drug policy reformer, lobbyist, and research coordinator. In 1998, she founded the Foundation to Further Consciousness, later renamed to the Beckley Foundation, a charitable trust which initiates, directs, and supports neuroscientific and clinical research into the effects of psychoactive substances on the brain and cognition. She also co-authored over 50 papers published in peer-reviewed journals, according to the Foundation. The central aim of her research was to investigate new avenues of treatment for such mental illnesses as depression, anxiety, and addiction, as well as to explore methods of enhancing well-being and creativity.

Feilding was a proponent of utilising the cognitive effects of cannabis since the 1960s. She experimented with trepanning, drilling a hole into her skull in 1970 to expose the dura mater, a technique used in some cultures to treat mental illness, and considered by some to provide a calming effect or a higher state of consciousness. She was also a proponent of the use of LSD to trigger long-term improvements in creativity.

In addition to the Beckley Foundation, Feilding founded numerous other organizations including Beckley Waves, Beckley Retreats, and Beckley Psytech.

== Early life and experiments ==
Born on 30 January 1943, Feilding was the youngest child of Basil Feilding (great-grandson of the 7th Earl of Denbigh and of the 3rd Marquess of Bath) and his wife, Margaret Feilding, who was his second cousin. She was born and brought up at Beckley Park in Oxfordshire, a Tudor hunting lodge with three towers and three moats, which was owned by her father and situated on the edge of a fen outside Oxford.

From an early age, Feilding was interested in states of consciousness and mysticism. At 16 years old, she embarked on a journey to Ceylon (now Sri Lanka) with £25 (about £743 in 2025), where her godfather, Bertie Moore, had become a Buddhist monk. Although she did not reach Ceylon, Feilding hitchhiked as far as the Syrian border, where she spent time living with Bedouins before returning to the UK. Feilding then studied Comparative Religions and Mysticism with Professor R.C. Zaehner, and Classical Arabic with Professor Albert Hourani. She concentrated later on learning about altered states of consciousness, psychology, physiology and, later, neuroscience.

Feilding had her first psychedelic experience at 22 years of age, when an acquaintance spiked her coffee with a massive dose of then-legal LSD. She retreated to her family home for months to recover.

Feilding gained notoriety in 1970 when she performed trepanation on herself, with a dental drill. She made a short art film about the experience, entitled Heartbeat in the Brain. The 1998 documentary A Hole in the Head contains footage from Heartbeat in the Brain. Feilding also began to microdose herself with LSD while she was in her 20s. A 2019 Guardian article offers this analysis: "It would be fair to say ... that her credibility as an advocate has not always been helped by her storied history with self-experimentation".

Trepanation was part of her exploration into the effects of different techniques to alter and enhance consciousness. During this period, she wrote Blood and Consciousness, which hypothesized that changing ratios of blood and cerebrospinal fluid underlie changes in consciousness, and also described the theory of the "ego" as a conditioned reflex mechanism that controls the distribution of blood in the brain.

== Beckley Foundation ==
In 1998, Feilding founded the Foundation to Further Consciousness, later renamed Beckley Foundation, a charitable trust which claims to promote a rational, evidence-based approach to global drug policies and initiates, directs, and supports pioneering neuroscientific and clinical research into the effects of psychoactive substances on the brain and cognition. The central aim of her research was to investigate new avenues of treatment for such mental illnesses as depression, anxiety, and addiction, as well as to explore methods of enhancing well-being and creativity. The Foundation states that Fielding co-authored over 50 scientific papers in peer-reviewed journals. Feilding was the Founder and executive director of the Foundation.

Through the Beckley Foundation, Feilding initiated, directed, and, supported scientific research investigating psychoactive substances, such as cannabis and other psychedelics (LSD, psilocybin, ayahuasca, DMT, 5-MeO-DMT, and MDMA, commonly known as Ecstasy).

She was a significant figure in modern psychedelic research, with the New Scientist calling her the "Queen of Consciousness". Among her projects are a study investigating the efficacy of using psilocybin as an aid to psychotherapy in overcoming depression and nicotine addiction, a brain imaging study investigating the effects of psilocybin and MDMA on cerebral blood supply, an examination of the effects of cannabis on creativity and of the importance of the THC/CBD ratio in mental health, and the first brain imaging study investigating the effects of LSD on the brain.

Feilding was also active in drug policy reform and was among the first to compile evidence upon which new policies could be formed, arguing that benefits as well as harms should be considered. In 2007, Feilding convened the Global Cannabis Commission, producing a report authored by a group of leading drug policy analysts, which lays out a plan for possible reforms of cannabis control policies at national and international levels. 2011 saw Feilding bring together members of the Global Commission on Drug Policy Reform (a panel of world leaders and intellectuals) and political leaders from 14 countries interested in reform. Together, at the House of Lords, they launched the Beckley Foundation Global Initiative for Drug Policy Reform, a joint initiative with the All Party Parliamentary Group on Drug Policy Reform, which was set up to support the BF's initiative to drive forward alternative approaches to drug control to create more humane, evidence-based policies that would reduce the potential harm of drugs to individuals and societies.

In 2013, President Otto Perez Molina of Guatemala asked Feilding to advise on the Guatemala government's policy on drugs, and in 2015, Mark Golding, the Jamaican Minister of Justice, invited Feilding to advise him and the government in developing plans for the country's new system of cannabis regulation. In May 2016, in response to the enforcement of the Home Office's Psychoactive Substance Act, the Beckley Foundation published a chapter on the regulation of new psychoactive substances (NPS) from an upcoming report entitled Roadmaps to Regulation: Cannabis, Psychedelics, MDMA and NPS.

=== Continued LSD research ===
A report in early 2019 indicated that the Foundation would be conducting further research into the use of LSD to trigger long-term improvements in creativity. (A previous study by the Beckley/Imperial Research Programme, in conjunction with Imperial College, indicated some likelihood of success in this goal, according to Feilding.) Feilding offered this summary of the new plan.

Participants will receive two microdoses (10 mic) per week over a period of four weeks. On each microdosing day, they will complete questionnaires to assess various aspects of their mood, wellbeing and cognitive functions as well as other tests, including a computerized Go game, to investigate creativity and intuitive thinking. Brain function will be measured using EEG both at rest and while participants are actively involved in those tests. Importantly, this study will also evaluate the safety and tolerability of repeated microdoses of LSD, via measures of LSD pharmacokinetics and pharmacodynamics, including physiological markers of inflammation and neurogenesis.

=== Beckley Canopy Therapeutics ===
News reports in 2018–2019 indicated that the Foundation had been retained by the Canadian cannabis producer Canopy Growth Corporation to conduct research as to the benefits of various strains of its products, particularly in treating pain, anxiety and drug addiction. One goal is to reduce dependence on opioids in treating cancer-related pain. The two formed Beckley Canopy Therapeutics in Oxford, to raise funds from investors for cannabinoid research and drug development.

Canopy Growth has been planning to export its products to the UK. The long-term intent of the partnership is to confirm the value of cannabis in specific conditions and to convince insurers to pay for medical cannabis when used accordingly. Mark Ware, Canopy's chief medical officer, said in an interview that Feilding's "ability to take a scientific look at what would otherwise be considered as controversial therapeutics makes her a very good partner".

Feilding's son, Cosmo Feilding Mellen, is the managing director of the partnership.

== Other ventures ==
=== Beckley Retreats ===
Beckley Retreats is a network of psychedelic retreat centers co-founded by Amanda Feilding in 2021. It provides programs utilizing psilocybin and operates in jurisdictions where psilocybin is legal, including Jamaica and the Netherlands.

=== Beckley Psytech ===
Beckley Psytech was founded in 2019 by Fielding and her son, Cosmo Fielding Mellen, as a drug development company based on Feilding's research. The company's aim is to convert her findings into commercial drug treatments. In 2025, Beckley Psytech merged with atai Life Sciences. The merged companies became known as AtaiBeckley. As of 2025, AtaiBeckley is in clinical trials with 5-meo-dmt, also known as BPL-003, to be used to treat patients with treatment-resistant depression.

=== Beckley Waves ===
Beckley Waves is a venture capital studio co-founded by Feilding in 2021. It invests and provides mentorship to entrepreneurs who build infrastructure for the sale and legal access to psychedelic medicines and therapies. In 2023 it purchased the ketamine therapy provider Nue Life.

== Personal life and death ==
In 1966 Feilding met and formed a relationship with Dutch scientist Bart Huges. From the late 1960s, she lived with British-born author Joseph Mellen, with whom she had two sons.

Feilding and Mellen separated in the mid-1990s. On 29 January 1995, she married James Charteris, 13th Earl of Wemyss and 9th Earl of March (then known by the courtesy title of Lord Neidpath), under the Bent Pyramid in Egypt. Feilding also used the title of Lady Neidpath.

When discussing how her mother viewed her life when Feilding was in her 30s, she made this comment during an interview: "There I was, druggy, trepanned, unmarried, with two sons – bastards, as she might have seen them – and she didn’t mind a bit".

Feilding worked at her family home, Beckley Park, near the village of Beckley, Oxfordshire. As of early 2019, the property housed the offices of five researchers and interns. Some news articles refer to Beckley Park as her residence, but Feilding and her husband maintained an official residence at Stanway House in Gloucestershire and also owned Gosford House in East Lothian.

In 2014 Feilding sold a version of the Chardin painting Le Bénédicité from the collection at Gosford House. It was attributed to the school of Chardin and sold for £1.15M. A subsequent examination revealed Chardin's signature, leading to its reattribution as the second known example in Chardin's own hand. It was resold for $10.5m (£8.5m) in January 2015. Feilding unsuccessfully sued the original dealer for negligence.

On 12 May 2025, Feilding posted a message on her Instagram account reporting that the immunotherapy treatment against liver cancer, which she had undertaken for the best part of a year, had not worked and as a result she had "shifted my focus to spending more precious time with my family and friends." She died at Beckley Park on the evening of 22 May 2025, at the age of 82.

== Trepanation advocacy ==
Feilding learned of trepanation from Bart Huges, whom she met in 1966, and who published a paper on the topic. The hypothesis that she investigated proposes that trepanation improves cerebral circulation by allowing the "full heartbeat" to express itself inside the cranial cavity, which Feilding hypothesises cannot fully occur after the closing of the cranial bones in adulthood. To compensate for the relative loss of blood in the brain, she hypothesised that humans developed an internal system of control of blood flow in the brain, which Feilding identifies with the development of the "ego" and the origins of language. Trepanation, Feilding hypothesises, allows increased blood circulation, allowing people to achieve and sustain a slightly higher state of consciousness that she theorises children experience before their cranial bones fuse. Recent research on patients with cranial lesions in collaboration with Prof. Yuri Moskalenko has provided evidence of blood flow changes. This is part of an investigation on the change of intracranial dynamics with age, and ways to increase cranial compliance (which, they theorise, might help limit the detrimental changes associated with ageing).

Feilding ran for British Parliament, in 1979 and later in 1983, on the platform 'Trepanation for the National Health' with the intention of advocating research into its potential benefits; she advocated the provision of the procedure by the National Health Service.

The claim that trepanation can expand consciousness and reduce neurosis has gained no support from the medical community.

== Selection of articles ==
Feilding co-authored a number of papers and reports with the Beckley Foundation.

=== Scholarly articles ===
- Carhart-Harris RL, ..., Feilding A, Nutt DJ (2016). Neural correlates of the LSD experience revealed by multimodal neuroimaging. Proceedings of the National Academy of Sciences, 113(17), 4853–4858.
- Carhart-Harris RL, ..., Feilding A, Nutt DJ (2016). Psilocybin with psychological support for treatment-resistant depression: an open-label feasibility study. The Lancet Psychiatry, 3(7), 619–627.
- Lebedev AV, ..., Feilding A, Nutt DJ, Carhart-Harris RL (2016). LSD-induced entropic brain activity predicts subsequent personality change. Human Brain Mapping, 37(9), 3203–3213.
- Tagliazucchi E, ..., Feilding A, Nutt DJ, Carhart-Harris RL (2016). Increased Global Functional Connectivity Correlates with LSD-Induced Ego Dissolution. Current Biology, 26(8), 1043–1050.
- Soler J, Elices M, Franquesa A, Barker S, Friedlander P, Feilding A, Pascual JC, Riba J (2016). Exploring the therapeutic potential of ayahuasca: acute intake increases mindfulness-related capacities. Psychopharmacology, 233(5), 823–829.
- Roseman L, Leech R, Feilding A, Nutt DJ, & Carhart-Harris RL (2014). The effects of psilocybin and MDMA on between-network resting state functional connectivity in healthy volunteers. Frontiers in human neuroscience, 8, 204.
- Carhart-Harris RL, ..., Feilding A, & Nutt DJ (2014). The Effects of Acutely Administered 3, 4-Methylenedioxymethamphetamine on Spontaneous Brain Function in Healthy Volunteers Measured with Arterial Spin Labeling and Blood Oxygen Level–Dependent Resting State Functional Connectivity. Biological psychiatry, S0006-3223(14)00005-5
- Schafer G, Feilding A, Morgan CJ, Agathangelou M, Freeman TP, & Curran HV (2012). Investigating the interaction between schizotypy, divergent thinking and cannabis use. Consciousness and Cognition, 21(1), 292–298.

=== Policy reports ===
- Room, Robin; Fischer, Benedikt; et al. (2008). "Cannabis Policy: Moving Beyond Stalemate". Beckley Foundation. September.
- Room, Robin (2012). “Roadmaps to Reformation: The UN Drug Conventions”. Beckley Foundation.
- Bryan, M; et al. (2013). "Licensing and regulation of the cannabis market in England and Wales: Towards a cost-benefit analysis”. Beckley Foundation.
- Feilding, A and Singleton, N. (2016). "Roadmaps to Regulation: New Psychoactive Substances”. Beckley Foundation.
- Moore K, Wells H, Feilding A (2019). "Roadmaps to Regulation: MDMA". Beckley Foundation
