= Beckley Retreats =

Psychedelic retreat center

- Type: Private
- Industry: Wellness tourism
- Founded: 2021
- Founders: Amanda Feilding, Neil Markey
- Headquarters: Jamaica
- Number of locations: Jamaica, Netherlands
- Key people: Neil Markey (CEO)
- Website: beckleyretreats.com

Beckley Retreats is a network of psychedelic retreat centers that provides integrated health programs utilizing psilocybin. Founded in 2021, it operates in jurisdictions where psilocybin is legal, including Jamaica and the Netherlands.

== History ==
Beckley Retreats was founded in 2021 by Amanda Feilding, Neil Markey, and others in the psychedelics field. Its first retreat took place in September 2022 in Jamaica and hosted approximately 20 guests. Feilding's personal experience with psychedelics inspired the retreats.

== Operations ==
Beckley Retreats operates in countries where psilocybin is legal, including the Netherlands and Jamaica. In Jamaica, retreats take place on the 2000-acre Good Hope Estate in Trelawny Parish, with Netherlands retreats taking place at multiple sites.

Retreats consist of multi-night stays and include mindfulness, meditation, and yoga. Retreat programs include pre-retreat preparation and post-program integration. During the retreats, participants consume psilocybin through tea or capsules, with ceremonies facilitated by therapists, physicians, and musicians and lasting approximately six hours.

Attendees have been described as high-functioning individuals including entrepreneurs, creatives and philanthropists. Retreats have been attended by CNN correspondents, tech executives, and the fashion editor of The Sunday Times. In 2025, a study of the effects of psychedelics in retreat settings was conducted by Robin Carhart-Harris at Beckley Retreats.
