= Rosalyn Moran =

Irish and British neuroscientist and computational psychiatrist

Rosalyn J. Moran
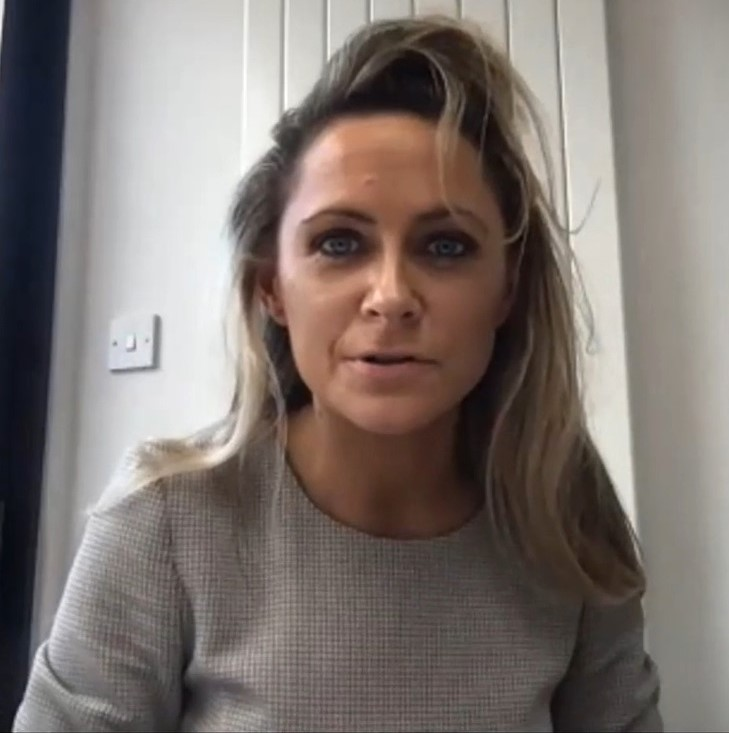
- Moran in 2020
- Education: University College Dublin
- Scientific career
- Workplaces: Stanhope AI; University of Bristol; Virginia Tech Carilion School of Medicine and Research Institute; King's College London; University College London
- Thesis: (2004)

Rosalyn J. Moran is an Irish and British engineer and neuroscientist. She is CEO and Co-Founder of Stanhope AI, the 'Active Inference'-based world model artificial intelligence solutions provider.. She is Professor of Computational Neuroscience at King's College London; her research has been based on understanding neural algorithms through brain connectivity.

== Early life and education ==
Moran grew up in Ireland, where she studied applied mathematics at the local boys school. Moran was an undergraduate and postgraduate student in electronic engineering at the University College Dublin. Her doctoral research applied information theory to biomedical signal processing. During her PhD, she met a scientist who was combining electrical and chemical analysis of schizophrenia, and became interested in pursuing a career in neuroscience. She was a postdoctoral researcher at University College London supported by the Wellcome Centre for Human Neuroimaging.

== Research and career ==
Moran moved to Virginia Tech Carilion School of Medicine and Research Institute in 2012, where she spent four years as an assistant professor. She returned to the United Kingdom in 2016 and joined the University of Bristol as a senior lecturer. In 2018, she was made associate professor at King's College London. She became deputy director of the King's Institute for Artificial Intelligence in 2022.

Moran's research combines artificial intelligence, Bayesian inference and experimental neurobiology to understand brain connectivity and neural processing. She is interested in how neurotransmitters (e.g. noradrenaline, serotonin) in decision making. She uses deep networks to model diseases, with a focus on neurodegenerative diseases and schizophrenia.

Moran has investigated the free energy principle, an all-purpose mode of the brain and human behaviour. The free energy principle is based on surprise minimisation, brains work to minimise free energy. Moran has argued that the free energy principle offers an alternative rationale for generative artificial intelligence.

Moran is the CEO of Stanhope AI.

== Selected publications ==
- Klaas Enno Stephan; William Penny; Jean Daunizeau; Rosalyn J Moran; Karl J. Friston (20 March 2009). "Bayesian model selection for group studies". NeuroImage. 46 (4): 1004–1017. doi:10.1016/j.neuroimage.2009.03.025. ISSN 1053-8119. PMC 2703732. PMID 19306932. Wikidata Q43103813. (erratum)
- K E Stephan; R J Moran; H E M den Ouden; J Daunizeau; K J Friston (12 November 2009). "Ten simple rules for dynamic causal modeling". NeuroImage. 49 (4): 3099–3109. doi:10.1016/j.neuroimage.2009.11.015. ISSN 1053-8119. PMC 2825373. PMID 19914382. Wikidata Q24645074.
- Karl J. Friston; Rosalyn Moran; Anil Seth (21 December 2012). "Analysing connectivity with Granger causality and dynamic causal modelling". Current Opinion in Neurobiology. 23 (2): 172–178. doi:10.1016/j.conb.2012.11.010. ISSN 0959-4388. PMC 3925802. PMID 23265964. Wikidata Q38069689.
