= Obelion =

Point on the skull

The term obelion is applied to that point of the sagittal suture which is on a level with the parietal foramina.
