= Self-inflicted caesarean section =

Form of self-surgery

A self-performed caesarean section is a form of self-surgery where a woman performs or attempts to perform a caesarean section on herself. Cases of self-performed caesarean section have been reported since the 18th and 19th century. While mostly deadly to either the woman, the child, or both, there are at least five known documented successful cases.

== Notable case ==
=== Inés Ramírez Pérez ===
In March 2000, Inés Ramírez Pérez, a Mexican woman from the state of Oaxaca, gained media attention after performing a caesarean section on herself. Despite having no medical training, the operation was successful and both she and her baby survived.

At midnight, on 5 March 2000, after 12 hours of continual pain, Ramírez sat down on a bench and drank three small glasses of hard liquor. She then used a 15-centimetre (5.9 in) kitchen knife to cut open her abdomen in a total of three attempts. Ramírez cut through her skin in a 17-centimetre (6.7 in) vertical line several centimeters to the right of her navel, starting near the bottom of the ribs and ending near the pubic area. (For comparison: a typical C-section incision is 10 centimetres (3.9 in) long, horizontal and well below the navel, the Pfannenstiel incision.) After operating on herself for an hour, she reached inside her uterus and pulled out her baby boy. She then severed the umbilical cord with a pair of scissors and became unconscious. She used clothes to bandage her wound after regaining consciousness, and sent one of her older sons to find help.

Several hours later, the village health assistant and a second man found Ramírez conscious and alert, along with her live baby. He sutured her incision with an available needle and thread.

Ramírez was eventually taken to the local clinic, 2.5 miles (4.0 km) away in San Lorenzo Texmelucan, and then to the nearest hospital, eight hours away by car. Sixteen hours thereafter she underwent surgical repair of the incision site. On the seventh post-operative day, she underwent a second surgery to repair complications resulting from damage to her intestines incurred during her C-section. She was released from the hospital on the tenth day post-surgery, and went on to make a complete recovery.

Describing her experience, Ramírez said, "I couldn't stand the pain anymore. If my baby was going to die, then I decided I would have to die, too. But if he was going to grow up, I was going to see him grow up, and I was going to be with my child. I thought that God would save both our lives."

The case was written up in the March 2004 issue of the International Journal of Gynecology & Obstetrics.

She is also believed to have been profoundly lucky in several ways: to have put herself in the position she chose, which put her uterus – rather than her intestines – against the abdominal wall under the incision site; to have not succumbed to infection from the large open wound in a non-sterile environment; to have not passed out from the pain part-way through, bled to death, or died from shock. She did say, afterward, that she did not advise other women to follow her example.
