= Psychedelic retreat =

Retreats using psychedelic drugs

A psychedelic retreat is a guided, multi-day program with a set or semi-set itinerary hosted by one or more facilitators where psychoactive substances or processes are administered to guests to improve their mental well-being. The program includes learning and lifestyle workshops on topics such as meditation and healthy eating. These retreats may include an overnight stay, ranging from just one night to one month or more, with meals, a variety of healing modalities, and other activities. A retreat may own its own facility or rent a space to provide suitable accommodation.

Psychedelic retreats can be found in more than a dozen countries, principally in places like Mexico, Costa Rica, Jamaica, and the Netherlands. Various psycheleics are used depending on the retreat, including ayahuasca, psilocybin, and San Pedro cactus.

== Overview ==
Psychedelic retreats are typically led by experienced facilitators who have gone through their own psychoactive-centered journey for self-improvement and learned how to administer the substances from veteran practitioners. Most commonly, these retreats include the administration of a dose of a psychoactive compound derived from natural sources, such as Ayahuasca, Mescaline (synthesized or derived from San Pedro(Huachuma) or peyote), Psilocybin (the active ingredient in 'magic mushrooms'), or ibogaine, provided by a seasoned practitioner; they may alternatively administer a dose of a synthetic compound, such as LSD or MDMA, or create a psychoactive experience without using a psychoactive substance, as in a Cacao ceremony or a darkness retreat.

At a retreat, guests often engage in a wide variety of activities in addition to the consumption of psychedelics. These activities are meant to draw on the insights the guest might have collected from their psychedelic experience so that they can be understood, and the learnings can be applied consciously to their daily lives. Many attendees of psychedelic retreats say that Michael Pollan's 2018 book, How to Change Your Mind, which explores the science of psychedelics in treating mental illness, was the objective proof they required to confirm their decision to attend the retreat.

=== Typical experience ===
A credible retreat center often has medical screening and an application process to help make sure that the consumer is mentally and medically prepared. There will be a strong emphasis on emotional and psychological integration after the experience. Retreat ceremonies are typically conducted by a Shaman who has been trained by indigenous people regarding the proper preparation and administration of the psychoactive compound. Typically, shamans are supported by therapists, medical practitioners, and other support staff. Every ceremony is an experience unique to the individual, and all those present may experience a completely different set of feelings, emotions, and bodily reactions. At the end of the retreat, people are encouraged to reflect on their experiences.

== Types of substances ==
Emerging research is demonstrating that many psychoactive substances appear to affect brain chemistry in similar ways. The hallucinatory experience caused by moderate to heavy doses of a variety of substances may work somewhat differently depending on the substance, but all have the ability to transform thinking, addictive impulses, general happiness, and potentially even physical changes.

Various psychedelic substances are offered depending on the retreat, including substances with ayahuasca being the most common followed by psilocybin and San Pedro cactus. Retreats can be found across the globe and vary in pricing depending on location and length of stay. A study by PLOS One published in 2025 found 130 retreats inside the United States and 310 internationally. Retreats offering psilocybin operate mainly in Jamaica and the Netherlands where the substance is legal.

Retreats may also be found in a variety of different settings. Guests can choose to visit a retreat with access to a local beach; surrounded by nature deep in a tropical jungle; in a private home; or at a rented convention facility at the center of an urban area. The comfort of the guest during the retreat is considered to be very important, as their response to the treatments may be better or worse (in terms of its effects and the nature of their experience) depending on how aligned they are to the 'set and setting' of the retreat itself. There are currently multiple marketplaces that offer full retreat packages along with additional services.

=== Ayahuasca ===
Based on the potential antidepressant and anxiolytic effects of ayahuasca, retreats offer brews rich in DMT. The treatment has been shown to be effective, with lower Addiction Severity Index scores seen in users of ayahuasca compared to controls.

=== Psilocybin ===
At psilocybin retreats, participants consume psilocybin through tea or capsules. Retreats are typically themed around specific events such as trauma, addiction, or just connecting with nature. They also include activities such as yoga, meditation, group activities, and art therapy. A 2025 study conducted by Robin Carhart-Harris of military veterans at Beckley Retreats showed the use of psilocybin integrated in a retreat setting was beneficial for treatment of depression and post-traumatic stress disorder.

=== Mescaline ===
Some retreats use mescaline obtained from San Pedro cactus in guided, ceremonial practices.

== Locations ==
Psychedelic tourism has gained popularity in countries that allow the substances to be administered, either due to their decriminalized, unregulated, or fully legal status. Countries such as Peru, Costa Rica, Mexico, the Netherlands, and Jamaica have psychedelic retreats of one kind or another. Psychedelic retreats in Jamaica, include MycoMeditations, Beckley Retreats, and One Retreats. Psychedelic retreats in the Netherlands include Inwardbound Institute, one of the pioneers since 2018, and Evolute Institute.

== Effacy in a retreat setting ==
=== Benefits ===
There are several specific mental health disorders that psychedelic therapy, delivered in any setting, may help treat, including greatly alleviating symptoms of depression and anxiety, notably in scenarios where these afflictions are resistant to other treatments. Additionally, these experiences can sometimes uncover suppressed trauma, enabling the consumer to address their trauma with less anguish. Similarly, compounds like ibogaine enable a consumer to overcome severe addictions that have otherwise been left unresolved by any other treatment.

Receiving psychedelic therapy in a retreat setting may amplify the experience for several reasons. A retreat setting allows a guest to work directly with an integration therapist throughout the day, aiding them in the process and coaching them through it for days or weeks. Different compounds have different styles and results in the treatment of specific afflictions and different levels of intensity.

=== Risks ===
Attending a psychedelic retreat is not without risk. The substances used in these retreats can, in rare circumstances, lead to negative and lasting impacts on individuals. In 2020, a 29-year-old British woman went to Peru for an ayahuasca retreat and developed mental health issues upon returning home, which later may have contributed to her committing suicide.

There have also been examples of sexual assault, violence, and petty crimes. In 2015, a Canadian tourist stabbed to death a fellow participant at a psychedelic retreat in the Amazon, after being attacked while under the influence of ayahuasca. In 2023, a shaman and another tourist were killed in a double murder at a different retreat. Robberies have also been reported in psychedelic retreat settings, as have sexual assaults. Psychedelic experiences produce immense physical and emotional vulnerability, and some women have claimed that they were molested by shamans while under the influence of a substance.

Rare deaths have been reported, although none that were attributed to use of psychedelics alone.
