= Khosrow Jamshidi =

Iranian hematologist

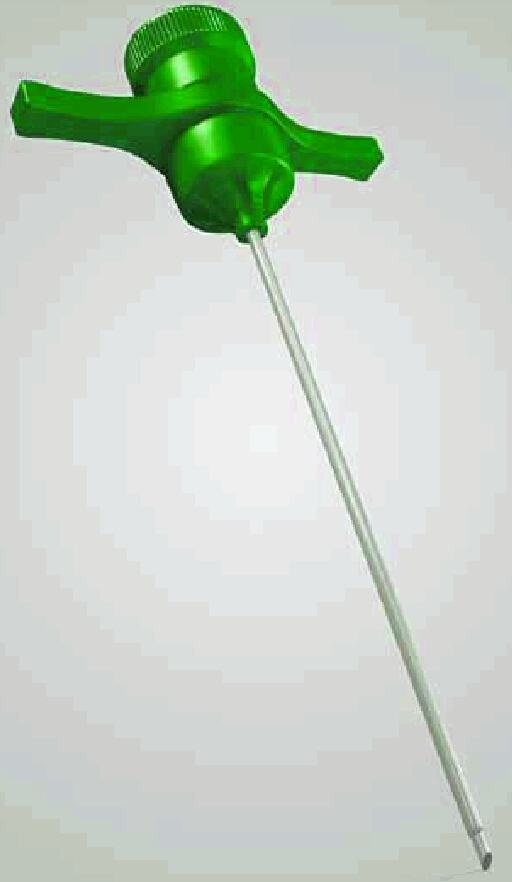
A disposable Jamshidi needle

Khosrow Jamshidi is an Iranian hematologist who invented the Jamshidi needle used for bone marrow biopsy.
