= Jamshidi needle =

Surgical instrument

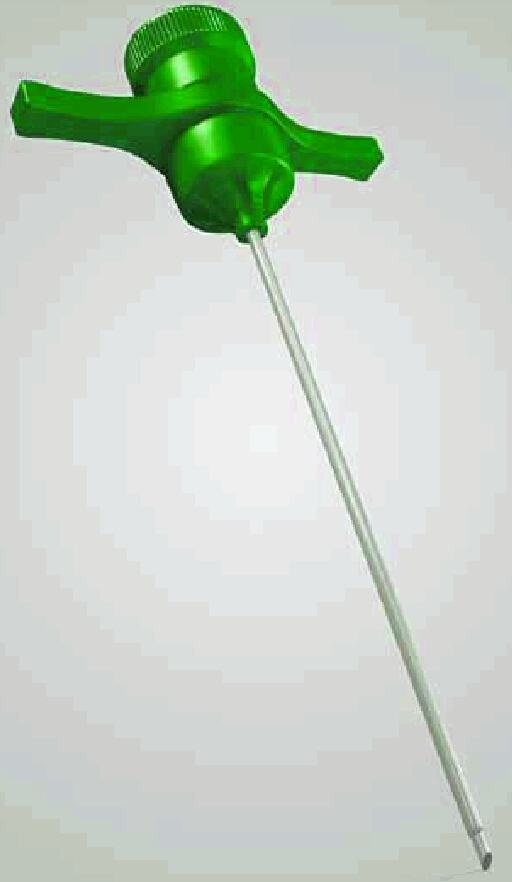
A disposable Jamshidi needle

The Jamshidi needle is a trephine needle for performing bone marrow biopsy, whereby a cylindrical sample of tissue, a core biopsy specimen, is obtained. It is a cylindrical needle with a tapered cutting tip. The tapered end reduces the potential of crush artifact. It is the most commonly used needle for performing bone marrow biopsies. The device is named for its inventor Khosrow Jamshidi who is an Iranian physician.

The Jamshidi interosseous needle has also been successfully used in pediatric patients, where a conventional intravenous line could not be established.

== See also ==
- Instruments used in general surgery
