= Trephine =

Bladed surgical instrument

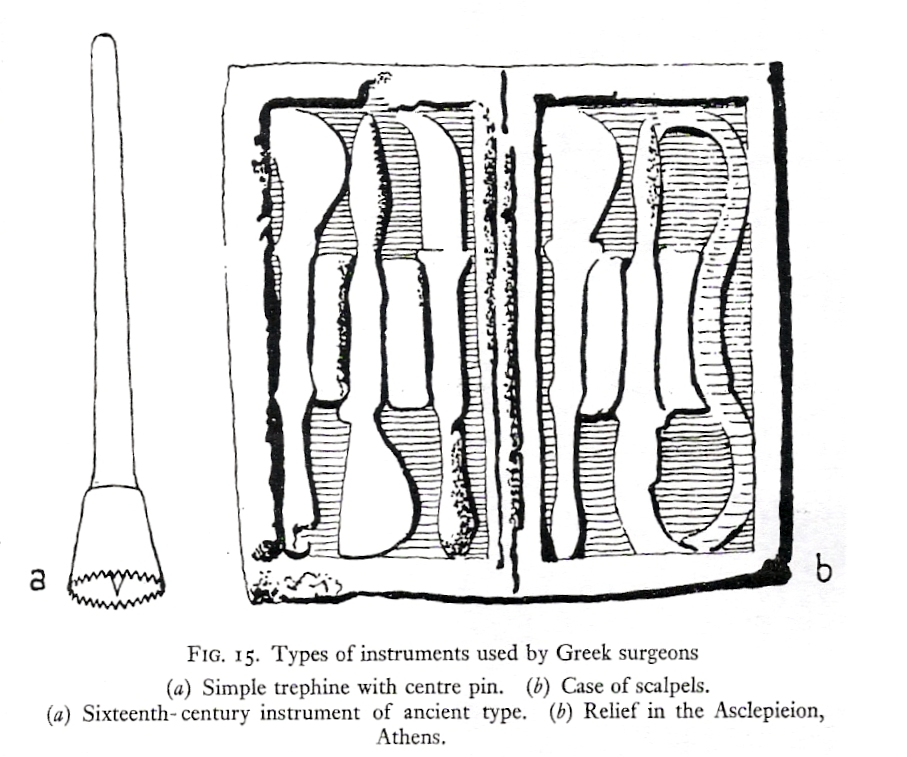
A trephine with a center pin can be seen on the left.

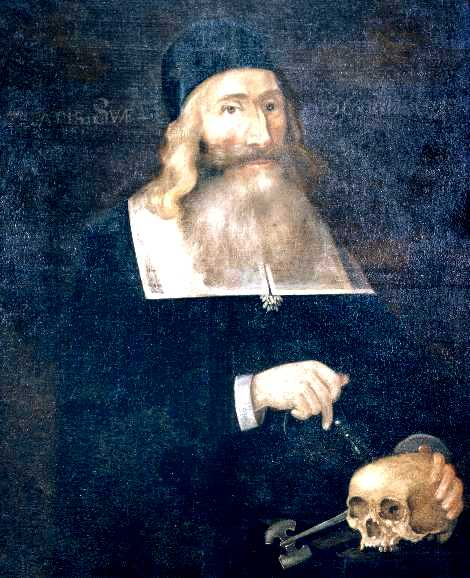
Dr. John Clarke trepanning a skull, ca. 1664, in one of the earliest American portraits. Clarke has a trephine in his right hand. The painting is in Harvard Medical School.

A trephine (/trɪˈfaɪn/; from Greek τρύπανον, trypanon 'instrument for boring') is a surgical instrument with a cylindrical blade. It can be of one of several dimensions and designs depending on what it is meant to be used for. A trephine may be specially designed for obtaining a cylindrically shaped core of bone that can be used for tests and bone studies, cutting holes in bones (e.g., the skull), or cutting out a round piece of the cornea for eye surgery.

A cylindrically shaped core of bone (or bone biopsy) obtained with a bone marrow trephine is usually examined in the histopathology department of a hospital under a microscope. It shows the pattern and cellularity of the bone marrow as it lay in the bone and is a useful diagnostic tool in certain circumstances such as bone marrow cancer and leukemia.

== See also ==
- Trepan
- Trepanning
- Trepanation in Mesoamerica
- Instruments used in general surgery
