= Trepanning =

Surgically drilling a hole in the skull

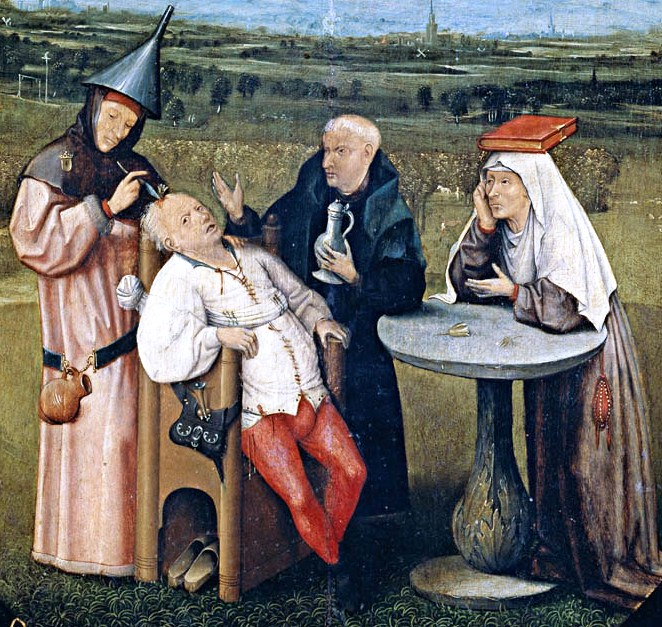
- Detail from The Extraction of the Stone of Madness, a painting by Hieronymus Bosch depicting trepanation (c. 1488–1516)
- Other names: Burr hole
- Specialty: Neurosurgery, neurology

Trepanning, also known as trepanation, trephination, trephining or making a burr hole (the verb trepan derives from Old French from Medieval Latin trepanum from Greek trúpanon, literally "borer, auger"), is a surgical intervention in which a hole is drilled or scraped into the human skull. This procedure is one of the oldest known surgical procedures, mainly performed by priests or "medicine men." Those who performed trepanation used materials such as stone, obsidian, bronze, or bone shaped into hand-held tools. The intentional perforation of the cranium exposes the dura mater to treat health problems related to intracranial diseases or release pressured blood buildup from an injury. It may also refer to any "burr" hole created through other body surfaces, including nail beds. The process to identify trepanation is through identification of a hole in the skull. The shape of the hole, cutting edges, and the healing process that is from the procedure also helps archeologists identify a trephined skull. A trephine is an instrument used for cutting out a round piece of skull bone to relieve pressure beneath a surface.

Trepanning was sometimes performed on people who were behaving in a manner that was considered abnormal. In some ancient societies it was believed this released the evil spirits that were to blame. Evidence of trepanation has been found in prehistoric human remains from Neolithic times onward. During that time, trephined skulls were commonly found in central Europe. After the Neolithic era, trephined skulls became less common due to the increased use of cremation. The bone that was trepanned was kept by the prehistoric people and may have been worn as a charm to keep evil spirits away. Evidence also suggests that trepanation was primitive emergency surgery after head wounds to remove shattered bits of bone from a fractured skull and clean out the blood that often pools under the skull after a blow to the head. Trepanation was also used for the purposes of removing splinters from head wounds and cranial decompression. Hunting accidents, falls, wild animals, and weapons such as clubs or spears could have caused such injuries. War injuries such as a bullet wound can mimic a trephined skull. Trepanations appear to have been most common in areas where weapons that could produce skull fractures were used. The primary theories for the practice of trepanation in ancient times include spiritual purposes and treatment for epilepsy, head wounds, mental disorders, and headaches, although the latter may be just an unfounded myth. Studies show that trepanation was used on individuals that were diagnosed with epilepsy, scurvy, frontal sinustis, intracranial disorders, diseases, hydrocephaly, and osteitis.

In modern eye surgery, a trephine instrument is used in corneal transplant surgery. The procedure of drilling a hole through a fingernail or toenail is also known as trephination. It is performed by a physician or surgeon to relieve the pain associated with a subungual hematoma (blood under the nail); a small amount of blood is expressed through the hole and the pain associated with the pressure is partially alleviated. Similarly, in abdominal surgery, a trephine incision is when a small disc of abdominal skin is excised to accommodate a stoma. Although the abdominal wall does not contain bone, the use of the word trephine in this context may relate to the round excised area of skin being similar in shape to a burr hole.

== History ==
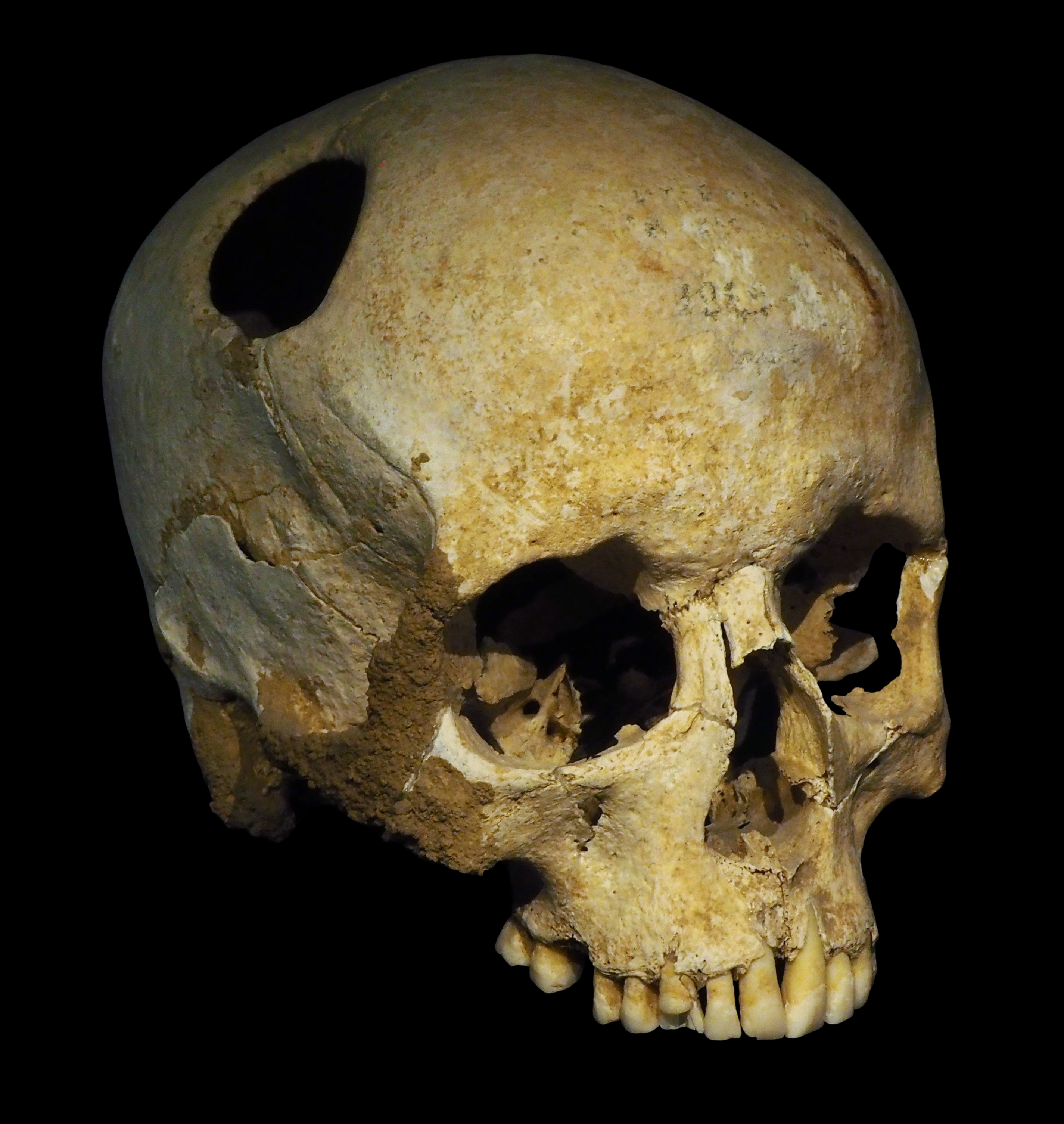
The perimeter of the hole in this trepanated Neolithic skull is rounded off by ingrowth of new bony tissue, indicating that the patient survived the operation.

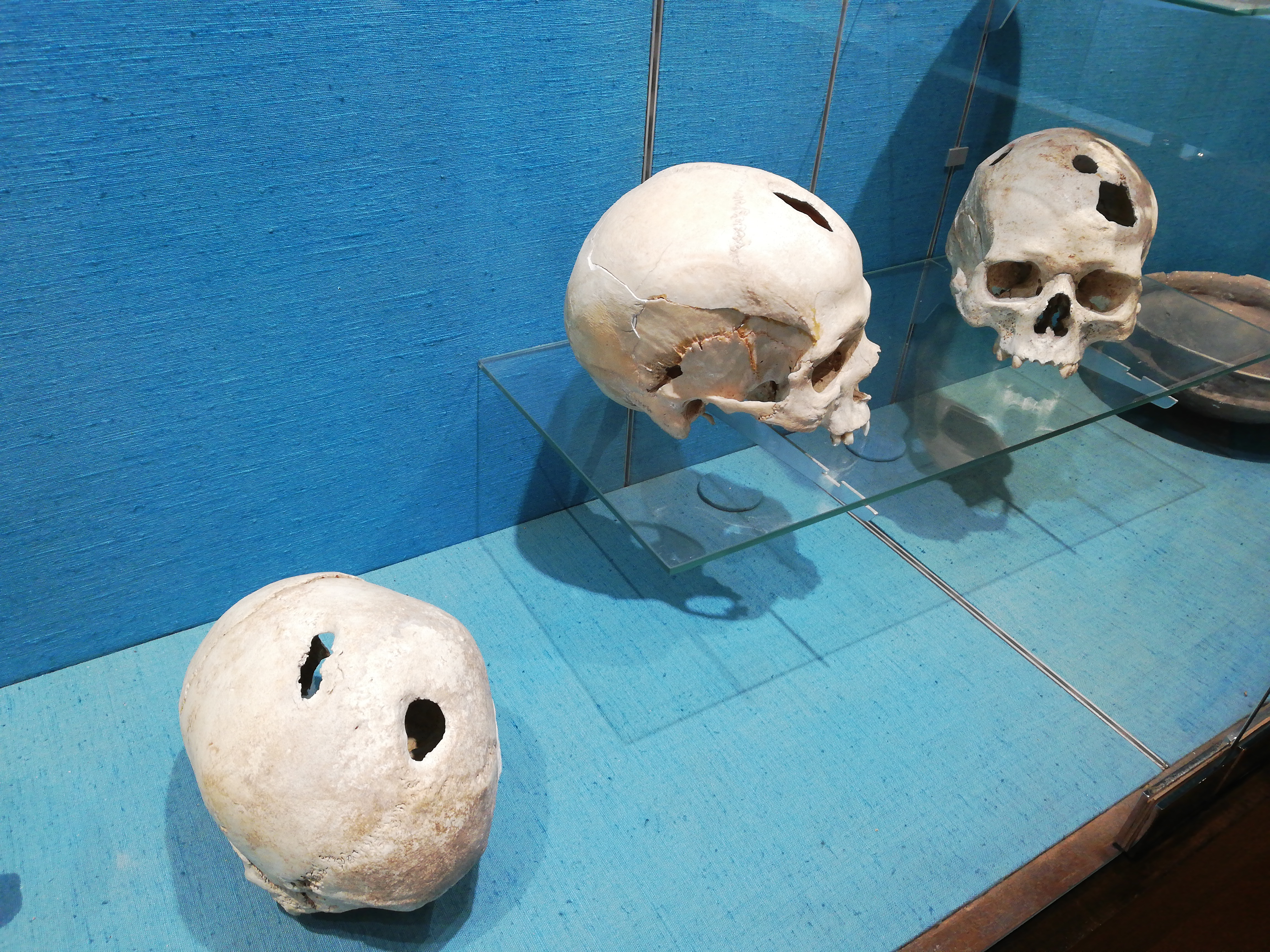
Skulls from the Bronze Age exhibited at the Musée archéologique de Saint-Raphaël (Archeological Museum of Saint-Raphaël), found in Comps-sur-Artuby (France). The subjects survived operations.

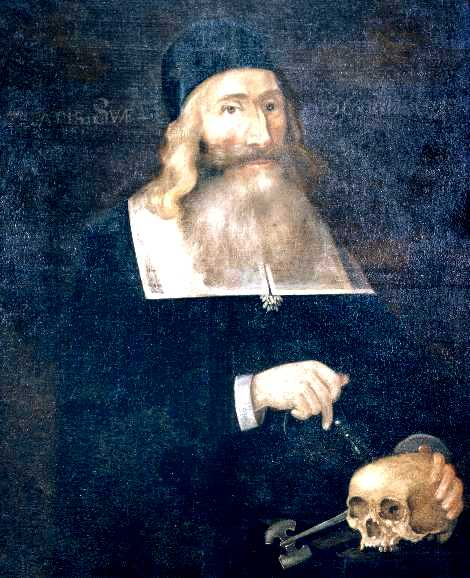
Dr. John Clarke trepanning a skull, c. 1664, in one of the earliest American portraits. Clarke is alleged to have been the first physician to have performed the operation in the New England Colonies.

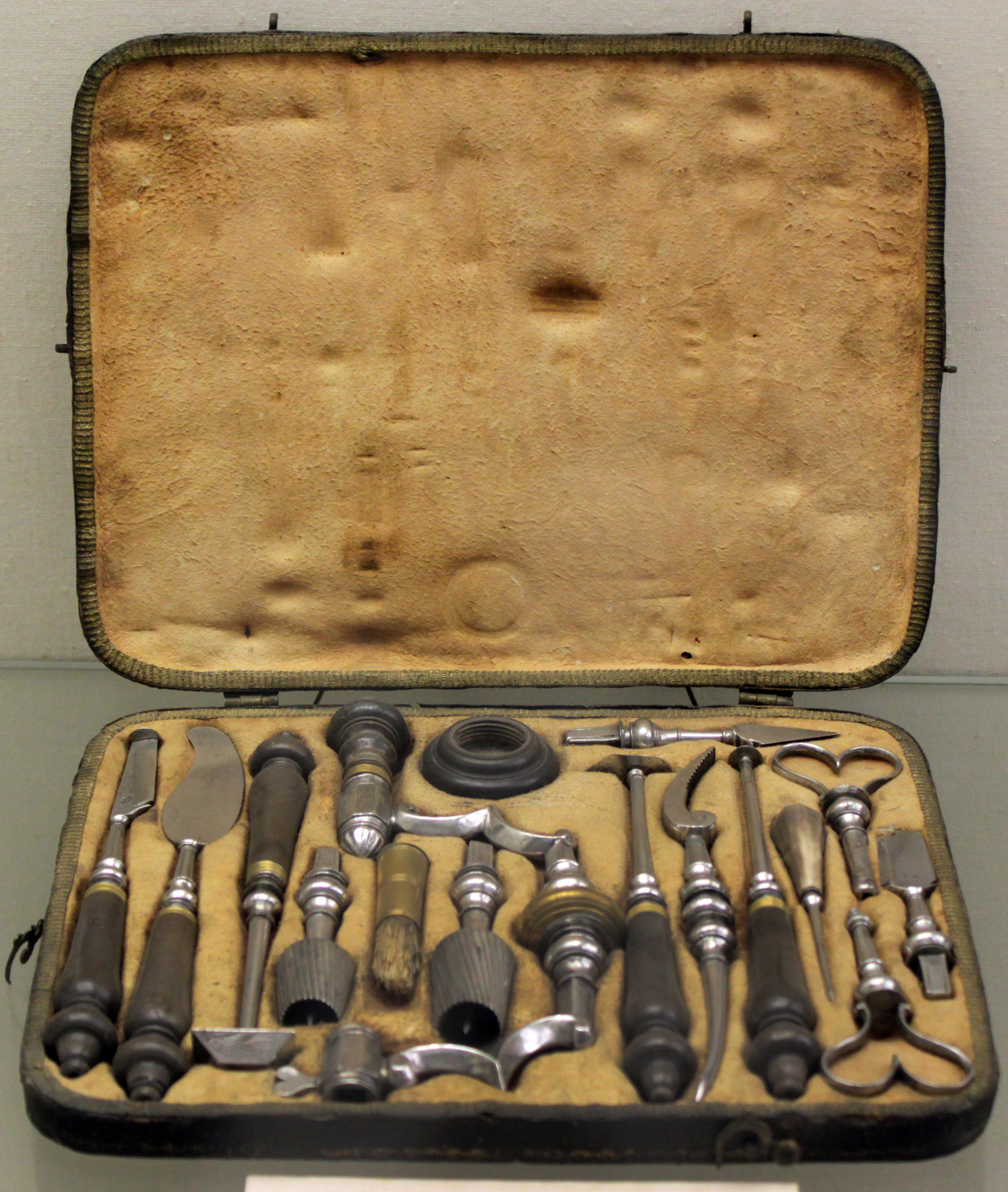
Trepanation instruments, 18th century; Germanic National Museum in Nuremberg

=== Prehistoric evidence ===
Trepanation dates back to 7,000–10,000 years ago, is perhaps the oldest surgical procedure for which there is archaeological evidence, and in some areas may have been quite widespread. Trepanation is a worldwide practice that was extremely common during the Neolithic era. The main pieces of archaeological evidence are in the forms of human remains. At one burial site in France dated to 6500 BCE, 40 out of 120 prehistoric skulls found had trepanation holes. At the time only around 40% of people survived the procedure. A skull of a child in an Harappan burial at Lothal dated to 2200 BCE shows signs of trepanation.

More than 1,500 trephined skulls from the Neolithic period (representing 5–10% of all cranial remains from that era) have been uncovered throughout the world – from Europe, Siberia, China and the Americas. Most of the trephined crania belong to adult males, but women and children are also represented.

There also exists evidence of trepanation being performed on a cow in France around 3400–3000 BCE. If performed while alive, the cow did not survive the procedure. It is unclear if this was performed as a veterinary procedure, medical experimentation or for other unknown reasons. However, it could be the earliest archaeological example of veterinary surgery or animal medical experimentation.

=== Pre-Columbian Mesoamerica ===
In the more recent times of postclassical pre-Columbian Mesoamerica, evidence for the practice of trepanation and an assortment of other cranial deformation techniques comes from a variety of sources, including physical cranial remains of burials, allusions in iconographic artworks and reports from the post-colonial period.

Among New World societies, trepanning is most commonly found in the Andean civilizations, such as pre-Incan cultures. For example, the Paracas culture Ica, situated in what is now known as Ica, located south of Lima. The oldest skull can be found in Paracas culture (700BC - AD300). Roman cultures left behind evidence of the practice by leaving lectures and writings written by scholars. Trepanation has also been found in the Muisca Confederation (in modern-day Colombia) and the Inca Empire. The Inca Empire used trepanation as a treatment for epilepsy and medicine. The rate of skulls being found in Perú were significantly high. Between 11 and 40% of skulls were found throughout different parts of the area. Instruments and techniques used in Perú seemed advanced due to the number of trephined skulls that missed the midline of the skull. This suggests that these cultures tried to decrease the risks and damages of this procedure. Avoiding the midline of the skull reduced damage to the cerebral sagittal sinus. This reflects the improvement in the survival rate increasing over time to 80%. In both, even cranioplasty existed. The prevalence of trepanation among Mesoamerican civilizations is much lower, at least judging from the comparatively few trepanned crania that have been uncovered.

The archaeological record in Mesoamerica is further complicated by the practice of skull mutilation and modification carried out after the death of the subject, to fashion "trophy skulls" and the like of captives and enemies. This was a widespread tradition, illustrated in pre-Columbian art that occasionally depicts rulers adorned with or carrying the modified skulls of their defeated enemies, or of the ritualistic display of sacrificial victims. Several Mesoamerican cultures used a skull-rack (known by its Nahuatl term, tzompantli), on which skulls were impaled in rows or columns of wooden stakes. Even so, some evidence of genuine trepanation in Mesoamerica (i.e., where the subject was living) has survived.

The earliest archaeological survey published of trepanned crania was a late 19th-century study of several specimens recovered from the Tarahumara mountains by the Norwegian ethnographer Carl Lumholtz. Later studies documented cases identified from a range of sites in Oaxaca and central Mexico, such as Tilantongo, Oaxaca and the major Zapotec site of Monte Albán. Two specimens from the Tlatilco civilization's homelands (which flourished around 1400 BCE) indicate the practice has a lengthy tradition.

Specimens identified from the Maya civilization region of southern Mexico, Guatemala and the Yucatán Peninsula show no evidence of the drilling or cutting techniques found in central and highland Mexico. Instead, the pre-Columbian Maya apparently used an abrasive technique that ground away at the back of the skull, thinning the bone and sometimes perforating it, similar to the examples from Cholula. Many skulls from the Maya region date from the Postclassic period (c. 950–1400 CE), and include specimens found at Palenque in Chiapas, and recovered from the Sacred Cenote at the prominent Postclassic site of Chichen Itza in northern Yucatán.

=== Ancient China ===
Before 2007, archaeological evidence of trepanation in ancient China was nonexistent. Since Chinese culture mainly focuses only on traditional Chinese medicine that usually entails non-surgical treatments such as acupuncture, balancing Qigong, cupping, herbal remedies, etc. The resulting misconception was that trepanation was not practiced in ancient China. Trepanned skulls have been found since the 1940s throughout China. Some of these skulls have dated back to the 3rd and 1st century BCE. However, in 2007, Han and Chen from the Institute of Archeology, Chinese Academy of Social Sciences looked at six trepanned skulls spanning between the Neolithic period through the Bronze and Iron Ages (c. 5000–2000 years ago) found in five different locations. Along with the discovery of these trepanned skulls, another collection of 13 trepanned skulls was discovered and dated to 3,000 years ago. In 2015, an intact 3,600-year-old mummy with a trepanned skull was discovered. Meanwhile, the oldest trepanned skull (M382) analysed by Han and Chen was radiocarbon dated to around 5,000 years ago and discovered at the Fuija site in Guangrao, Shandong. The skull, which belonged to an adult male, exhibited a right parietal calvarial defect (31 x 25 mm) with evidence of scraping by a trephine-like tool. Additionally, bone regeneration and smooth edges suggest that the subject recovered from the surgery and lived a relatively long time afterward.

The 3,600-year-old perforated skull of a mummified female dating to 1615 BCE was found in the Xiaohe tomb in China's Xinjiang Uygur Autonomous Region. The only known female with a trepanned skull, it showed signs of bone spurs growth and retraction of the edges, suggesting that she also survived the surgery. Found in a massive burial site, this mummy was one of the hundreds found in the "Little River" Tomb complex.

The Bronze Age was found to be the period with the largest number of trepanned skulls in ancient China.

=== Medieval East Africa ===
Trephining has a long history in East Africa. Bones of depressed fractures were elevated by surgeons of Bunyoro-Kitara. The hair may or may not have been shaved depending upon the site of the operation.

Trepanning at the Kisii people in Kenya was filmed in 1958.

=== Pre-modern Europe ===
Trepanation was known to prehistoric Europeans, with some populations having impressive success rates of 78% in the Iron Age. Central Europe during the Neolithic era had an important understanding of the risks of trepanation. They used aids like rudimental anesthetic, antiseptic, and technological aids.

Trepanation was also practised in the classical and Renaissance periods. Hippocrates gave specific directions on the procedure from its evolution through the Greek age, and Galen also elaborates on the procedure. During the Middle Ages and the Renaissance, trepanation was practiced as a cure for various ailments, including seizures and skull fractures. Out of eight skulls with trepanations from the 6th to 8th centuries found in southwestern Germany, seven skulls show clear evidence of healing and survival after trepanation, suggesting that the survival rate of the operations was high and the infection rate was low.

In the graveyards of pre-Christian (Pagan) Magyars, archeologists found a surprisingly high frequency (12.5%) of skulls with trepanation, although more than 90% only partial (these served probably ritual purposes). The trepanation was performed on adults only, with similar frequencies for males and females, but increasing frequency with age and wealth. Additional research has suggested that the male to female proportion of these individuals was 2:1. Children accounted for only 7% of trephined skulls. This custom suddenly disappeared with the Magyars' conversion to Christianity.

A small area near (modern) Rostov-on-Don, in southern Russia, may have been a centre for ritual trepanning, around 6000 years ago, according to archeologists who discovered remains of eight recipients of the practice, within a small area, all with the incision in the unusual obelion position, high on the back of the head.

During the 16th and 17th centuries, around 80% of people survived the procedure of trepanation.

=== Modern medical practices ===
The prefrontal leucotomy, a precursor to lobotomy, was performed by cutting a trephine hole into the skull, inserting an instrument, and destroying parts of the brain. This was later made unnecessary by the development of the orbital transit lobotomy where a spike was inserted through the eye-sockets.

Trepanation is a treatment used for epidural and subdural hematomas, and surgical access for certain other neurosurgical procedures, such as intracranial pressure monitoring. Modern surgeons generally use the term craniotomy for this procedure. Unlike in folk practices, a craniotomy must be performed only after diagnostic imaging (like computed tomography and magnetic resonance imaging) has pinpointed the issue within the skull; preoperative imaging allows for accurate examination and evaluation. Unlike in trepanation, the removed piece of skull (called a bone flap) is typically replaced as soon as possible, where it can heal. Trepanation instruments, nowadays being replaced with cranial drills, are now available with diamond-coated rims, which are less traumatic than the classical trephines with sharp teeth. They are smooth to soft tissues and cut only bone. Additionally, the specially designed drills come with a safety feature that prevents the drill from penetrating into the brain tissue (through the dura mater). Along with antisepsis and prophylaxis of infection, modern neurosurgery is a common procedure for many reasons other than head trauma.

In documented cases of trepanning done in Africa and Oceania during the 20th century, patient survival rate was seen to be approximately 90%.

=== Myth of trepanation as a treatment for headaches ===
After the retrieval of some skulls from the Neolithic era that showed signs of trepanation, in the nineteenth century, the false belief that these holes were drilled for the treatment of headaches or other neurological disorders started spreading. During the 1870s, the French anthropologist and physician Paul Broca found several European and South American children's skulls dating to the Neolithic age that were perforated surgically. Since no signs of fractures that could justify this complex procedure to relieve trauma were found, a debate emerged around why these children were subjected to trepanation while they were still alive. Broca theorized that this operation had a ritual or religious purpose, probably to remove "confined demons" inside the head of the patient, or to create healing or fortune talismans with the removed skull fragments. Superstitions were created by ancient settlers who believed that drilling a hole in the skull would release demons. However, he also suggested that the operation may have been performed to treat some infantile conditions such as febrile seizures to explain why it was performed only on children. Broca also concluded that trephination was mostly performed on live patients.

Broca never mentioned headaches, though, and the association was established only several decades later by the world-famous Canadian physician William Osler in 1913. Osler misinterpreted Broca's words, and added other conditions such as "infantile convulsions, headache and various cerebral diseases believed to be caused by confined demons." Osler's theory was seen as particularly palatable by other armchair anthropologists, who were fascinated by the idea that folk traditions and/or myths could be linked with the treatment for common conditions such as migraine. Eventually, Broca's speculation came to be accepted as fact, and the myth was perpetuated by other historians and physicians. To this day, there's no credible evidence supporting this theory, especially since children are much less frequently affected by migraine and headache disorders than adults. Nevertheless, the myth persists.

=== Cultural perspectives on trepanation ===
The motivations behind trepanation varied significantly across cultures, often tied to beliefs about health, spirituality, and the treatment of ailments. Early instances of the practice may have been influenced by a combination of supernatural beliefs and early understandings of physical ailments, leading to its acceptance in various medical traditions. In many cultures, it was believed that drilling a hole in the skull will let out the evil spirits that caused pain and illness. It can be explained as most head injuries and diseases, such as migraines, felt like pounding, so cutting a hole in the head may help to relieve the pain and pressure. In Africa and Europe, not only was this procedure performed for spiritual reasons, but also the discs made of cranial bones were commonly used as a shield from demons and evils. In China, twelve shaman corpses in a tomb were found with trephined bodies because they also had duties of doctors. This shows the connection between cranial surgery and religion; there was a conception that an open hole in the head contributed to communication with gods and the souls of dead people. In tribal groups (what tribal groups?), trepanning was seen as a medicine to maintain youth and a cure for rheumatism. Priests were a common person to perform this procedure, leading to beliefs of metaphysical objectives like exorcism. Trepanation was also associated in Chinese medicine with the balance of vital energy, or qi. They understand trepanation as a way to balance the body and energy, spiritual and physical health. On the other hand, it was thought that cerebral disorders arise from the loss of the spiritual image in ancient Peru, an illness developed after being separated from the body. Trepanation would have been done in order to allow the spirit to reenter the body. In these cases, the patient may have suffered from paralysis, cerebral palsy, severe depression, or intellectual disability.

== Tools and methods ==
In ancient times, trepanation instruments were less complex, and were commonly made out of flint, obsidian, or harder material such as stone knives, and later with metal such as bronze and copper. During the beginning and middle of the Neolithic period, flint was commonly used as a tool but as time went on, tools became more refined in shape and were eventually made from bronze. Additionally, the procedure was done by practitioners utilizing tumi (ceremonial knife in early Peru), sharpened seashells (South Pacific), a trephine drill, bronze knife, etc. The Greeks and Romans were the first to design medical instruments to penetrate the skull. Such instruments includes the terebra serrata, made to perforate the cranium by positioning the instrument's pointed end against the cranium and manually rolling the instrument's shaft back and forth between the surgeon's two hands. By the Renaissance period, when trepanation was routinely performed, a range of instruments were developed to accommodate the demand.

As many as five main methods were found for trephination:

1. Rectangular intersecting cuts
2. Scraping utilizing an abrasive instrument such as flint
3. Circular grooving
4. Boring and cutting by a circular trephine or crown saw
5. Burr hole done by drilling several circle holes closely to create a space and then cut/chisel the bone between the hole.

The scraping method was found to be the most common in prehistoric times. Individuals who would perform this procedure would scrape away at the lamina extera, the diploe, and then the lamina intera which will allow for dura mater to be exposed. A woman was found in Pritschona that was trephined by scraping with silex. This resulted in the skull being removed in a powder form. The opening of the skull had bevelled edges that were wide. Archeologists have found that this method was common up to the Italian renaissance era. The differences in method vary in the amount and depth of bone being removed. The trepanation surgical procedure includes exposure of the dura mater without damaging the underlying blood vessels, meninges, and brain. Over time, the skin will reform over the puncture site, but the hole in the skull will remain.

The location of the trepanation on the skull varies by geographical region and period, common locations are the frontal and the occipital bones. In most cases, trepanation was a one-off operation, with only a small percentage of the trepanned skulls having undergone more than one surgery. In those with multiple openings, the extent of bone remodelling helps identify whether the opening was done at around the same time or at different times during the individual's life.

== Healing ==
Scientists did not believe there were prehistoric, trephined skulls that went through the healing process. According to research, 70% of skulls exhibited signs of healing after the procedure. Bone remodelling indicates that the process of healing after trepanning has occurred. The oldest cases of healed trephined skulls can be found between 10,000 and 5,000BC. Identifying the healing period after someone has passed away from this procedure is difficult for archeologists. No signs of healing exhibit that a patient had died shortly after the procedure occurred. Healing around the edges of the bone’s opening show how efficiently the patient has healed. There are three stages with the healing process of this procedure. The first stage of this procedure is the inflammatory stage that lasts from day 1 to day 21. A hematoma is usually formed that is surrounded by stem cells and monocytes. The second stage occurs after day 3 and can last up until 3 weeks. This is where the cartilaginous callus is formed from different stem cells. Finally, in the third stage around the 4th week, the callus would be ossified. In some cases, after multiple months, the skull will then be remodeled until the opening has healed. Skulls with no macro or microscopic changes suggest that the individual died within a week or two from the surgical procedure.

== Risks ==
A neurosurgeon can perform the procedure safely, although it comes with severe repercussions such as direct or indirect perioperative complications, which include increased damage to the brain, infection, blood loss, hemorrhage, and potentially death due to the trauma as the skull's protective covering is compromised. The operation leaves very minimal space for error and a high incidence of mortality if the dura mater is penetrated. Additionally, there is a high risk of infection if the operation is conducted with contaminated tools or improper sanitary wound care. If the infection is not caught and treated immediately, it can be fatal or lead to significant and permanent brain damage. Historical evidence demonstrates that the procedure was performed during the Neolithic era, and that use of tools such as freshly knapped (and therefore, sterile) flint or obsidian stone contributed to reduced infection. After surgery, neither the surrounding bone nor the trepanned bone piece ever show any osseous healing like other bones. Osteoclastic and osteoblastic activity occurs after the first week; hyperemia and osteoclastic activity are seen on the necrotic bone surrounding the trepanation site, due to loss of blood supply.

== Voluntary trepanation ==
Since the early 1960s, voluntary trepanation has been performed by people interested in "enhancing mental power and well-being". The practice of trepanning also continues today due to belief in various pseudoscientific medical benefits. For example, some have tried trepanation as a means of emulating the "third eye", in order to achieve clairvoyance or as a means of maintaining a "permanent state of euphoria". Other proponents claim that trepanning results in increased blood flow. Individuals have practiced non-emergency trepanning for psychological purposes. A prominent proponent of the modern view is Peter Halvorson, who drilled a hole in the front of his own skull to increase "brain blood volume".

One of the most prominent advocates of trepanning was Dutch librarian Bart Huges. In 1965, Huges drilled a hole in his own head with a dentist drill as a publicity stunt. Huges claimed that trepanning increases "brain blood volume" and thereby enhances cerebral metabolism in a manner similar to cerebral vasodilators such as ginkgo biloba. These claims are unsubstantiated by research. Huges and his girlfriend also made several comic books in the 1970s, which promoted trepanation.

In a chapter of his book Eccentric Lives & Peculiar Notions, esotericist John Michell cites Huges as pioneering the idea of trepanning in his 1962 monograph, Homo Sapiens Correctus, which is often cited by advocates of self-trepanation. Among other arguments, Huges contends that children have a higher state of consciousness and since children's skulls are not fully closed, one can return to an earlier, childlike state of consciousness by self-trepanation. Further, by allowing the brain to freely pulsate Huges argues that a number of benefits will accrue.

Michell quotes Joey Mellen's book, Bore Hole. At the time the passage below was written, Joey and his partner, Amanda Feilding, had made two previous attempts at trepanning Mellen. The second attempt ended up placing Mellen in the hospital, where he was reprimanded severely and sent for psychiatric evaluation. After he returned home, Mellen decided to try again. He describes his third attempt at self-trepanation:

After some time there was an ominous sounding schlurp and the sound of bubbling. I drew the trepan out and the gurgling continued. It sounded like air bubbles running under the skull as they were pressed out. I looked at the trepan and there was a bit of bone in it. At last!

Feilding also performed a self-trepanation with a drill, while Mellen shot the operation for the short film Heartbeat in the Brain, which was long thought to have been lost. Portions of the film can be seen in the documentary A Hole in the Head.

Michell also describes a British group that advocates self-trepanation to allow the brain access to more space and oxygen. Other modern practitioners of trepanation claim that it holds other medical benefits, such as relief from depression and from other psychological ailments. In 2000, two men from Cedar City, Utah, were prosecuted for practicing medicine without a license after they performed a trepanation on an English woman to treat her chronic fatigue syndrome and depression.

In 2023, Michael Raduga, a Russian lucid dreaming researcher, performed self-neurosurgery that included trepanation, electrode implantation, and electrical stimulation of the motor cortex. The goal was to stimulate the brain during REM sleep, sleep paralysis, and lucid dreams.

There are very few cases of self-trepanation. Only five cases in a five-year span have been reported as self-trephination. In English literature, only seven cases known to have a patient with schizophrenia perform self-trephination. A female patient, 56 years old was diagnosed with schizophrenia. This mental disorder is associated with neurocognitive impairment. She had delusions of having foreign body objects that resulted in her picking at the skull until dura mater was exposed. The wound measured 4 x 3 x 4 cm on the top of the skull. After being hospitalized she lost mobility, balance, and the ability to perform daily activities.

Another patient, 65 years old, used a power drill to drill a hole through his scalp and skull. The laceration was identified behind the hairline in the left frontal area. The hole was 1 cm in diameter and missed the midline. A television program that implied that trephination would lead to self-fulfillment prompted him to perform trepanation on himself. It took him 30 minutes to get through the skull which followed by hospitalization. The patient reported that he felt no improvement of his well-being. He was never diagnosed with psychotic or suicidal thoughts before this incident, but after being hospitalized he was diagnosed with dissocial personality disorder.

== Modern interpretation and research ==
Modern forensic and medical research on trepanned skulls demonstrates advanced surgical skills in prehistoric societies and highlights how trepanation influenced later developments in neurosurgery and the history of medicine. With the advancement of technology, it became possible to examine and interpret the trepanned skull with CT scans and new techniques of bioarchaeology. A recent study provided new perspective of the healing process of skull after cranial trepanation: even though there are many examples of prehistoric cranial lesions that have been classified as "healed trepanations", the research shows that definition of "healing" is not consistent. One of the reasons of distinction in variations of healing process is difference of surgical methods such as "scraping" or "grooving" that might alter the angle of the edge. The first smoothening of bone begins in 5 months, but total healing or closure never happens.

By the 20th century, the ancient practice of trepanning evolved into procedure of bone marrow biopsy, which became vital for identifying illnesses including anemia, leukomia, lymphoma, and tuberculosis. This change happened as doctors realized the need of accessing the inside of bones for diagnostic purposes, especially in the treatment of blood-related ailments. The initial tools of trepanning as crown trephine transitioned into the biopsy needles in modern medicine, such as the Vim-Silverman needle and the Jamshidi needle.

== See also ==
- Craniotomy
- Mütter Museum
- Shrunken head
