= Bart Huges =

Dutch librarian

Huges trepanning himself in 1965

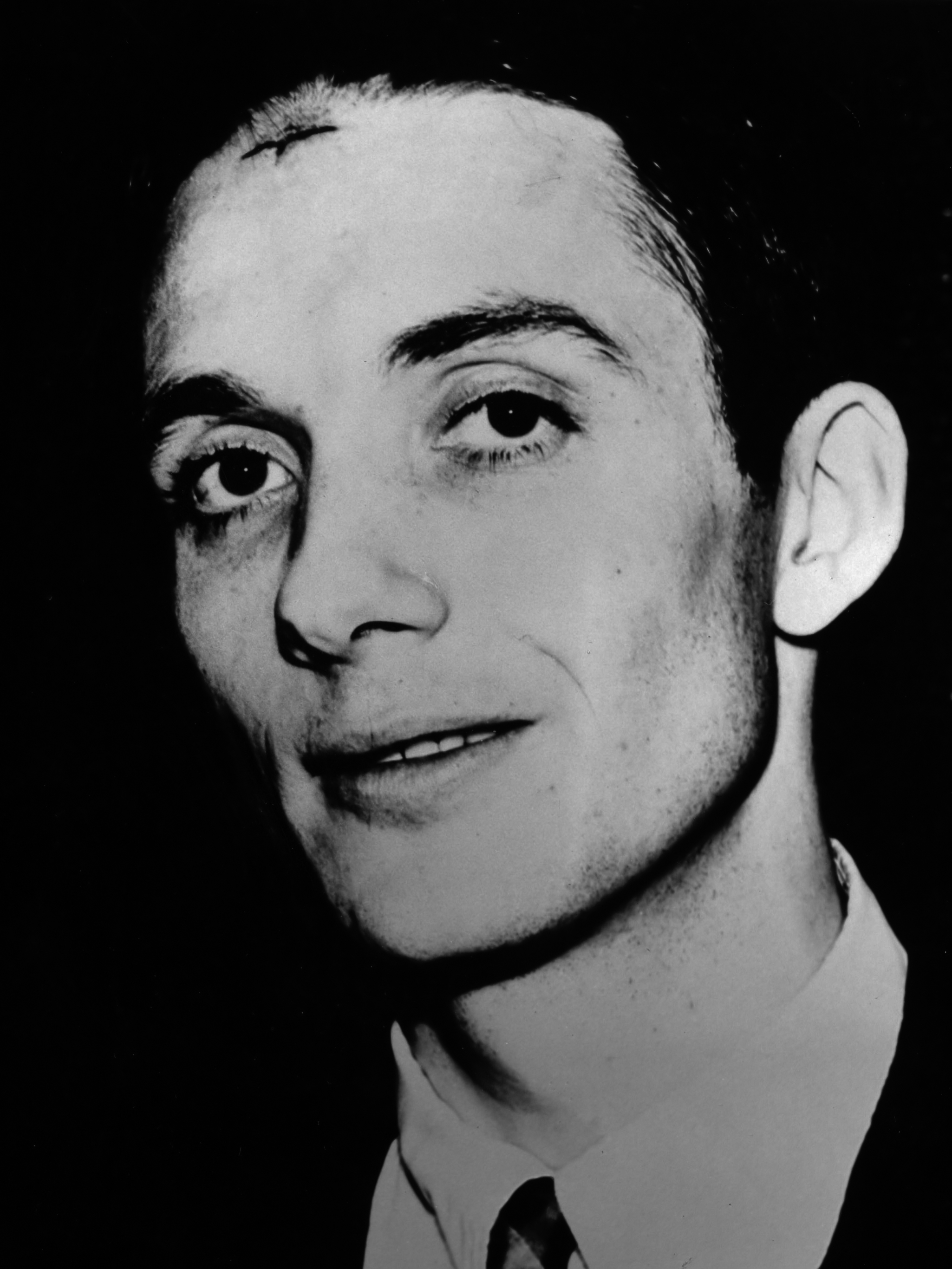
Huges after trepanning himself in 1965

Hugo Bart Huges (also Hughes; 23 April 1934 – 30 August 2004) was a Dutch librarian and proponent of trepanation. He attended medical school at the University of Amsterdam, but was refused a degree due to his advocacy of marijuana use. In 1964 he published "The Mechanism of Brainbloodvolume ('BBV')" (also known as "Homo Sapiens Correctus"), a scroll in which he proposed that trepanation could be used to enhance brain functionality by balancing the proportion of blood and cerebral spinal fluid. Huges believed that, when mankind began to walk upright, our brains drained of blood and that trepanation allowed the blood to better flow in and out of the brain, causing a permanent "high". Using a foot-operated electric dentist drill, Huges drilled a hole in his skull on 6 January 1965. He also published "Trepanation: A Cure for Psychosis", in which he expanded upon his theory, and an autobiography, The Book With The Hole, in 1972.

In the 1970s Huges and his girlfriend Eveline van Dijk made several comics promoting trepanation.

His writings influenced the British-born Joey Mellen to undergo self-trepanation, which he documented in a book called Bore Hole. Huges died of heart disease on 30 August 2004, at the age of 70. He is buried at Zorgvlied cemetery.

== Publications ==
- Bart Huges: The book with the hole. Autobiography. Translation and elaboration by Joe Mellen and Amanda Feilding. Amsterdam, Foundation for Independent Thinking (F.I.T.), 1972.
- H.B. Huges: Trepanation. The cure for psychosis Transl. by Joe Mellen. Amsterdam, Foundation for Independent Thinking (F.I.T.), 1971.
- Hugo Bart Huges: The mechanism of brainbloodvolume. Transl. by Joe Mellen. Amsterdam, Foundation for Independent Thinking (F.I.T.), 1970.
