= Joey Mellen =

British writer

Joseph Mellen (born September 1939) is the British-born author of Bore Hole, a book about his attempts at self-trepanation, influenced by Bart Huges, and his eventual success with the help of his partner Amanda Feilding.

Mellen and Feilding lived together from the late 1960s until the early 1990s. They had two sons, Rock Basil Hugo Feilding-Mellen (born 1979) and Cosmo Birdie Feilding-Mellen (born 1985). Rock Feilding-Mellen was a local councillor and cabinet member for housing, property and regeneration with the Royal Borough of Kensington and Chelsea. Following the Grenfell Tower fire and its aftermath, he resigned.

In 1994 Mellen met Jenny Gathorne-Hardy, who was trepanned in 1995. Their son Rudy Blu was born in 1996 and they were married later that year; their daughter Lily was born in 2012.

== Other sources ==
- Michell John (1984), Eccentric Lives and Peculiar Notions, ISBN 0-15-127358-8
