= I Feel Love (disambiguation) =

"I Feel Love" is a 1977 song by Donna Summer. It may also refer to:

- "I Feel Love", a 1974 song by Charlie Rich, featured in the film Benji
- "I Feel Love", a 1989 song by Aishah and The Fan Club
- "I Feel Love", a song from Rav Shmuel's 2006 album, Protocols
- "I Feel Love", a song written by Jimmy Davis
- "I Feel Love (Good Sensation)", a 2006 song by Sabrina Salerno
- "I Feel Love (All the Time)", a song from Theo Katzman's 2011 album, Romance Without Finance
- "I Feel Love (Every Million Miles)", a 2015 song by The Dead Weather
- I Feel Love!, a 2009 live performance by George Chakravarthi
- I Feel Love: MDMA and the Quest for Connection in a Fractured World, a 2023 nonfiction book by Rachel Nuwer

== See also ==
- "I Feel Loved", a 2001 song by Depeche Mode
- "I Feel Love Comin' On", a 1967 song by Felice Taylor
- "Feel Love", a 2011 rap song by J. Cole
