= Corporate propaganda =

Claims made by corporations for the purpose of manipulating market opinion

Corporate propaganda refers to corporations or government entities that spread specific ideology in order to shape public opinion or perceptions and promote its own interests. The more well-known term, propaganda, refers to the spreading of information or ideas by someone who has an interest in changing another person's thoughts or actions. Two important early developers in this field were Harold Lasswell and Edward Bernays. Some scholars refer to propaganda terms such as public relations, marketing, and advertising as Organized Persuasive Communication (OPC). Corporations must learn how to use OPC in order to successfully target and control audiences.

== History ==
It was not until the 20th century that the term propaganda started to become more well-known. The invention of the newspaper and radio aided the public's knowledge of this term because of its use in World War I. Harold Lasswell was the first to define propaganda as it is thought of today. He defined it as a person or group that aims to influence the opinion or actions of another through psychological manipulations, often subconsciously.

=== Early propaganda ===
One of the initial developers in the field of propaganda was Edward Bernays. Propaganda became more widely known during World War I when the US government hired Bernays for the Committee for Public Information (CPI). Throughout the early portion of his career, he called himself a propagandist. While he was employed by the CPI, Bernays established the "Counsel on Public Relations" and established Public Relations as a stand-alone practice. He once stated in an interview, "If this could be used for war, it can be used for peace," speaking about the uses of propaganda. During World War I, the term propaganda had taken on a negative connotation due to its use in Nazi Germany. In Bernay's book Propaganda, he stated that the using the term was a crucial part of organizations that wanted to get noticed by the public. Since propaganda had negative connotations already, he wanted it separated from its original connotation so that organizations could use targeted messaging to influence American consumers. He wanted to redefine propaganda to fit in the Public Relations role. His "new propaganda" was to be seen as a tool to be used by corporations to shape society's opinions and persuade consumers.

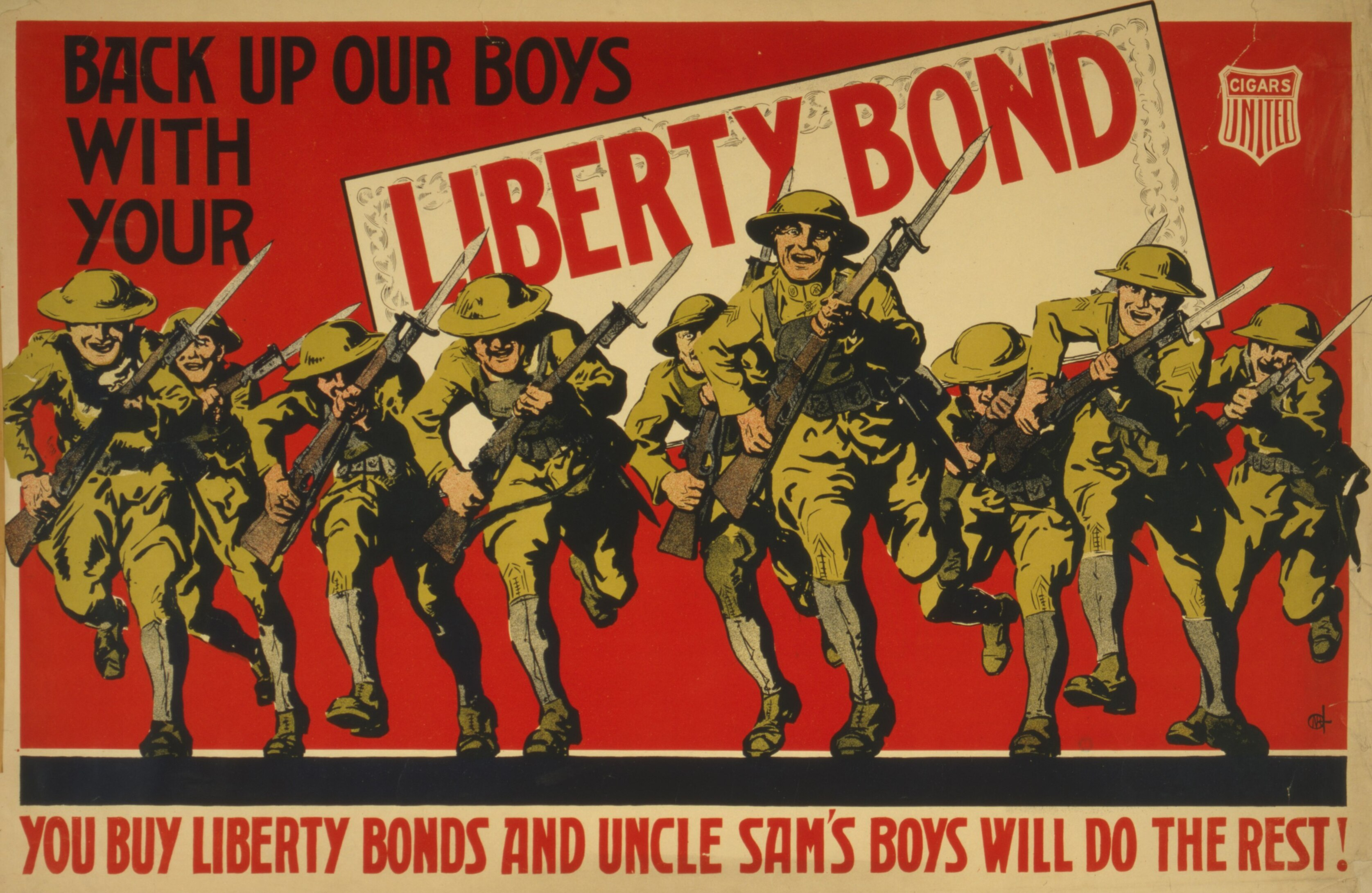
Example of US World War I Liberty Bond Advertisement propaganda

=== Propaganda in war ===
The first users of propaganda in the US was the government. President Woodrow Wilson needed a way to persuade the American people to support US involvement in World War I. The CPI recruited famous American artists, filmmakers, and writers to make pro-war products and advertisements. Newspapers and magazines printed advertisements urging that it was the American citizen's duty to buy war bonds and stamps to support the war efforts.

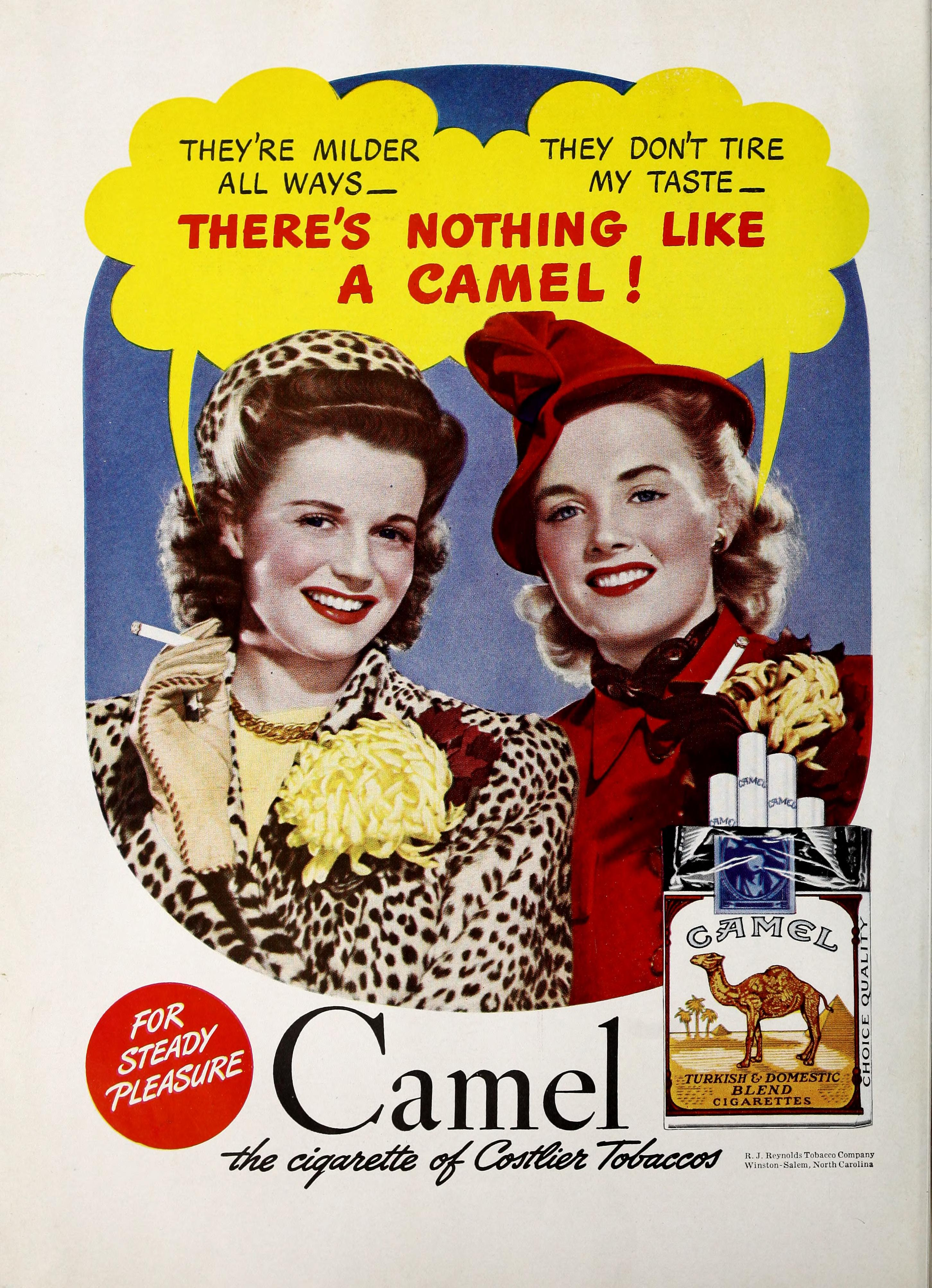
Tobacco cigarette advertisement that was made specifically to appeal to women

=== Propaganda for products ===
After the success of the pro-war propaganda campaign, Bernays was hired by the American Tobacco Company to find a way to persuade American women to start smoking. In the 1920s men were the primary consumers of cigarettes, and the American Tobacco Company saw women as an untapped potential consumer base. The first campaign Bernays created was aimed at women's beauty standards. He came up with the idea to advertise cigarettes as a way to lose weight. The advertisements encouraged them to pick up a cigarette instead of a fattening food. This campaign worked incredibly well, and women started smoking at home but not out in public, so Bernays created his second campaign. This time, it appealed to the feminist movement. He labeled cigarettes "torches of freedom" and said they promoted equality among the genders. This was a successful campaign because many women were involved in the feminist movement at the time and were eager to accept changes that put them on the same level as men.

== Corporate propaganda vs. PR ==
Not all scholars agree that propaganda can be defined as PR. Those in the field of PR see organized persuasive communication (OPC) as a non-manipulative (consensual) form of persuasion in a democratic society. While others see all propaganda, as manipulative both historically and in current societies.

The early scholars of propaganda, like Lasswell, saw the notion of organized manipulation as unavoidable, and as society progressed, more and more corporations came to rely on it. Scholars of propaganda believe it to be a manipulative type of persuasion that intends to influence a person's opinion. They believe that those who use propaganda do not care if it is used un-consensually or deceptively.

Those who study the field of PR tend to distance themselves from the word propaganda. They believe that any form of OPC that is highly manipulative only occurs in authoritarian governments or governments that are in direct opposition to democratic societies. They do not relate PR with any form of deception, incentivization, or coercion. The negative connotation people associate the word propaganda with has been difficult to change since its initial conception in World War I. The public resistance to adopting the idea that propaganda was not always corrupt led Edward Bernays to redefine forms of propaganda to PR.

Another reason PR scholars have tried to separate themselves from propaganda is because some say that any form of persuasion is manipulation. Corporations rely on persuasion to sell an idea and a product. PR scholars believe that if all persuasion is manipulation, then consumers would unable to tell the difference between actual and untrue advertising statements.

== Ethics ==
During the period right after World War I, the press and journalists were opposed to the practice of public relations. They believed that journalists only wrote for the interest of the public and condemned public relations for writing subjective statements that only benefited the clients. Many journalists were critical of Bernays and his new public relations. They had a hard time seeing the differences between PR and press agents. Bernays believed that, at its core, PR was a moral practice that benefited all society, but he had trouble convincing others of that.

Even though Bernays felt his definition of PR was completely ethical, some scholars criticized his involvement in the field. One occurrence that Bernays was involved with that had people questioning the ethics of propaganda or PR involved the National Electric Light Association (NELA) and their parent company General Electric (GE). In 1928. NELA implemented a propaganda campaign that discouraged the public from owning any of the electric utilities. Their propaganda campaign was set in newspapers and schools. The company publicly said that the campaign was for educational purposes so that the public would be more informed about the industry. However, when the government investigated them, it was found that they were buying off schools and faculty. They were found not only to be conducting manipulative forms of propaganda but also to have gone as far as to completely block opposing viewpoints, which was directly against what Bernays said propaganda was used for. When Bernays was asked to write about this incident, he said that when a PR counsel takes on an organization, they must maintain an entirely ethical stance, and when a point of view is bought, it is no longer ethical. Though some corporations use PR manipulatively, Bernays still believed that those who use PR had an obligation to keep its use ethical.

== See also ==
- 1977 Nestlé boycott
- Alcohol advertising on college campuses
- Astroturfing
- Better Living Through Chemistry
- Direct-to-consumer advertising
- Happy Meal
- Hawaii series by Georgia O'Keeffe
- Joe Camel
- National Association of Manufacturers
- Nutritionism
