= Dying to Know =

Dying to Know

- Dying to Know: Ram Dass & Timothy Leary 2014 documentary film about Ram Dass and Timothy Leary
- "Dying to Know", song by Pennywise from Unknown Road
- "Dying to Know", song by Clawfinger from Life Will Kill You
- "Dying to Know", song by Arrogance from Rumors (album)
- "Dying to Know", song by Tegan and Sara from Love You to Death (album)
- Dying to Know You (2012) Aidan Chambers
