= Michael Clegg =

Michael Clegg is the name of:

- Michael Clegg (drug distributor) (born 1937 or 1938), American MDMA producer and seller
- Michael Clegg (footballer) (born 1977), English footballer
- Michael Clegg (naturalist) (1933–1995), British museum curator, naturalist, and television presenter
- Michael T. Clegg (born 1941), American plant geneticist
