= Michael Clegg (drug distributor) =

- Born: 1937 or 1938 (age 87–88)
- Other name: Satyam Nadeen
- Occupations: Seminarian; Entrepreneur
- Years active: Early 1980s to early 1990s
- Organization: The Texas Group
- Known for: Distributing and popularizing MDMA ("Ecstasy")

Michael Clegg, also known as Satyam Nadeen, is an American former seminarian and entrepreneur who manufactured and distributed MDMA in the 1980s and 1990s. His business, known as The Texas Group, has been described as almost certainly the largest MDMA producer in the world from the early 1980s to the early 1990s. Clegg is credited with popularizing MDMA as a recreational drug.

== Early life ==
Clegg was born and raised in Chicago, Illinois. He went into the Catholic seminary with the aim of becoming a priest but dropped out at the age of 26 in 1965.

== MDMA business ==
Clegg tried MDMA for the first time in Cancun, Mexico in 1978 when he was 40 years old. He began to distribute MDMA in Dallas, Texas in 1979. A few years later, in 1983, he met an associate named Bob McMillen and began efforts to produce and sell MDMA on a larger scale. Clegg coined the name "Therapy" as a marketing name for MDMA. However, McMillen is said to have rejected this name, and instead proposed the name "Ecstasy", which the pair ultimately agreed upon. According to other reports however, the name "Ecstasy" emerged in 1980 or 1981, prior to when Clegg is said to have met McMillen.

They sold MDMA by phone and mail and their business selling the drug quickly exploded. In 1984, they were making 1 million tablets per month and still were not meeting demand. The group even had the number 1-800-ECSTASY for taking orders. They also specifically introduced MDMA to clubs. The Filipino–American chemist Carina Leveriza (later Carina Leveriza-Franz), who left her job at Intel, worked overseeing the industrial-scale production of MDMA for Clegg.

Clegg once donated and sold Rick Doblin almost 40,000 MDMA tablets in 1985, which Doblin then re-sold to his contacts, for instance in the MDMA-assisted therapy community. Doblin used the proceeds to help fund research into MDMA, for instance at the Multidisciplinary Association for Psychedelic Studies (MAPS) founded in 1986.

Clegg claims that he wished to change the world with MDMA. However, McMillen has said that Clegg's only motivation was money.

MDMA became a Schedule I controlled substance in mid-1985. Despite this, Clegg and The Texas Group continued producing and selling MDMA. They also tried to market MDEA as a replacement for MDMA, but this was unsuccessful. Although MDMA was scheduled, it nonetheless flourished in popularity and became emblematic of the rave and club scenes of the late 1980s and 1990s.

== Prison and subsequent life ==
Clegg, along with several of his associates, was eventually arrested in 1992 or 1993 and was tried and convicted for producing and selling MDMA, serving years in prison.

During his time in prison, Clegg had a spiritual awakening, wrote a book, and assumed the new name Satyam Nadeen. As part of his transformation into a guru, Clegg denounced drugs as a "false path". Clegg eventually began running yoga retreats in Costa Rica and Georgia.

== Popular media ==
A television series about Clegg was underway in 2019. Clegg was covered in Rachel Nuwer's 2023 book I Feel Love: MDMA and the Quest for Connection in a Fractured World. A 2026 documentary film called Prophet of Ecstasy was made about Clegg.

== Publications ==
=== Books ===
- Nadeen, Satyam (1996). From Onions to Pearls: A Journal of Awakening and Deliverance. New Freedom Press. ISBN 978-0-9653850-0-8.

== See also ==
- Carina Leveriza-Franz
