= The Substance: Albert Hofmann's LSD =

2011 Swiss documentary film

- Directed by: Martin Witz
- Written by: Martin Witz
- Produced by: Andres Pfäffli; Elda Guidinetti
- Cinematography: Pio Corradi; Patrick Lindenmaier
- Edited by: Stefan Kälin
- Music by: Marcel Vaid
- Production companies: ventura film sa RSI Radiotelevisione svizzera Teleclub AG; Lichtblick Film- und Fernsehproduktion GmbH; Spotlight Media Productions AG
- Release date: August 2011
- Running time: 89 minutes
- Countries: Switzerland; Germany
- Languages: English; German

The Substance: Albert Hofmann's LSD is a 2011 Swiss documentary film written and directed by Martin Witz. Drawing on material from more than fifty film archives, it examines the history of LSD. In 2012, the film won awards at PARISCIENCE and the Berlin & Beyond Film Festival, and it was screened at festivals including Locarno, Göteborg, and Seattle.

== Synopsis ==
The documentary traces the history of LSD from Swiss chemist Albert Hofmann’s discovery of the substance in Basel in 1943 to its use by psychiatrists in the 1950s. It then follows the drug’s spread beyond clinical settings in the 1960s, its prohibition in the 1970s, and its later return to legal therapeutic use.

== Reception ==
=== Awards and nominations ===
The film won the Prix Audace at the PARISCIENCE Festival international du Film Scientifique, the Audience Award for Best Documentary at the Berlin & Beyond Film Festival in San Francisco, and the Special Jury Award at the 360° Contemporary Science Film Festival in 2012. It was also nominated for the Swiss Film Award for Best Documentary Film that year.

=== Critical response ===
Filmdienst described the film as an engaging documentary on the history of LSD and its Swiss discoverer Albert Hofmann, calling it an entertaining as well as informative combination of archive footage and interviews with contemporary witnesses. SRF wrote that Martin Witz’s film, drawing on material from more than fifty film archives, succeeds in showing the eventful history of LSD. Variety described it as “a lopsided and somewhat sedate history” of LSD.

== Festival screenings ==
The film was screened at festivals including the 64th Locarno Film Festival, the International Documentary Film Festival Amsterdam, and the 8th Seville European Film Festival in 2011. Among its 2012 festival screenings were the 35th Göteborg International Film Festival, the Seattle International Film Festival, the Buenos Aires International Festival of Independent Cinema, and the Galway Film Fleadh.

== See also ==
- List of psychedelic documentaries
- Hofmann's Potion: The Pioneers of LSD (2002)
