= Carina Leveriza-Franz =

Filipino–American chemist

- Born: December 1954 (age 71)
- Other names: Carina Leveriza; Karen Leveriza
- Occupations: Chemist; Businesswoman; Hiking guide
- Organization(s): Intel; The Texas Group
- Known for: Production of MDMA in the 1980s and early 1990s

Carina "Karen" Leveriza-Franz is a Filipino–American chemist who is known for being one of the world's most prolific underground MDMA ("Ecstasy") producers. Working for Michael Clegg and The Texas Group, she manufactured MDMA on an industrial scale from the mid-1980s through the early 1990s. Clegg and the Texas Group are credited with popularizing MDMA as a recreational drug.

== Early life and education ==
Leveriza-Franz was born in December 1954 in the Philippines and was raised there. She got into Filipino politics as a teenager and marched in Manila against the Marcos regime. Her parents worried about her safety due to her politics, so they sent her to the United States. Leveriza-Franz studied chemistry in college in California and earned a Ph.D. degree in this area in the 1970s.

== Career ==
Leveriza-Franz took a job at Intel in Santa Clara, California in 1979. She worked in the area of lithography and the wafer fabrication process.

Howard Butcher, her boss at Intel, tasked her with some consulting on a side project in November 1981. This side project involved scaling up the synthesis of a chemical compound called MDMA from the gram to kilogram level. She was given a 1980 journal article coauthored by Alexander Shulgin describing MDMA and its synthesis along with other materials for this work. Later, in April 1982, Butcher asked her to become actively involved in scaling up production at a foundry and she agreed. Leveriza-Franz initially had no familiarity with MDMA, which was still obscure at the time. She merely did what she was asked, and was told that the work was for industrial use.

In March 1985, Butcher's boss Michael Clegg approached Leveriza-Franz for work on larger-scale production of MDMA. He and The Texas Group also finally informed her that they were manufacturing the drug for recreational use and had her try it. She was apprehensive about the group but tried the drug and found it to be "heart opening" and produced "a relaxed yet almost explosively energetic outpouring of love". Previously, Leveriza-Franz says that she had been motivated solely by money and opportunity. But after trying MDMA, she felt that she was involved in something "far bigger than me" and that she was helping spread connection and love in the world. She left her job at Intel to work on MDMA production.

Leveriza-Franz oversaw most of the MDMA production for Clegg and The Texas Group from the mid-1980s to the early 1990s. She made at least 1,000 lbs (~450 kg) of the drug, or enough for over 3 million doses. Leveriza-Franz is described as a highly-skilled perfectionist who produced high-quality, highly pure, pharmaceutical-grade MDMA. Rick Doblin once had a sample of her MDMA tested and it was of greater than 99.99% purity. As authorities began to crack down on production and use of MDMA around 1985, Leveriza-Franz and The Texas Group opted to move the drug's production from the United States to Mexico. Leveriza-Franz took a break from producing MDMA in 1989. In 1991 however, she resumed, and set up a new lab in Brazil. In addition to her work producing MDMA, Leveriza-Franz also worked in the tech industry in Silicon Valley, including forming a startup company called Syn Labs that was involved in lithography for memory chips.

In 1991 and 1992, the United States Drug Enforcement Administration (DEA) infiltrated The Texas Group. In March 1992, Clegg and Walter "Walt" Franz, Leveriza-Franz's husband, were arrested. Franz refused to disclose Leveriza-Franz's location and she went on the run. Leveriza-Franz was finally arrested while hiding out with her infant daughter under a blanket at her parents' house in Florida in January 1993.

Leveriza-Franz was sentenced to 78 months (6.5 years) in prison for producing MDMA. Her conviction was upheld upon appeal. Leveriza-Franz served her time in prison and was released a year early. After being released from prison, she continued life with her husband Walt and her daughter and worked for a tax office and later in life as a hiking guide. Leveriza-Franz has said that she does not regret her involvement in MDMA production or her incarceration as she felt that "we touched millions of people" and "this had a huge effect on humanity". However, she has also described struggling with her time in prison and with what she did, including avoiding the media for many years. Leveriza-Franz has jokingly likened herself to a female version of Walter White from Breaking Bad, except saying that she "didn't go so much into mobile homes".

== Personal life ==
Leveriza-Franz met Walter "Walt" Franz, who was working for Michael Clegg and was also involved in MDMA manufacture, in 1985. She entered a relationship with Franz after taking MDMA with him, her second time trying the drug, and within a few years they had married. Leveriza-Franz has described being given 2,000 MDMA tablets by Clegg as a gift and taking all of them between her and Franz. She had a daughter with Franz in 1992. Later on, after decades of marriage, Franz died of cancer in 2014. In the 2010s and 2020s, Leveriza-Franz has worked full-time as a hiking guide in Sedona, Arizona. She eventually swore off use of all psychoactive drugs, including alcohol, instead preferring immersion in nature and saying that she no longer needs MDMA. She has also said that she has become the "living MDMA", that the drug is "within me, it's part of me, cellularly", and that she is now able to "impart connectivity and love without any drugs".

== Popular media ==
Leveriza-Franz was featured in Rachel Nuwer's 2023 book I Feel Love: MDMA and the Quest for Connection in a Fractured World. She was also featured in the documentary film Prophet of Ecstasy about Michael Clegg in 2026.

== See also ==
- List of psychedelic chemists
- Michael Clegg
