= Better Living Through Chemistry (2021 film) =

- Directed by: Connie Littlefield
- Written by: Connie Littlefield
- Produced by: Connie Littlefield, others
- Starring: Alexander Shulgin, Ann Shulgin, Myron Stolaroff, Jean Stolaroff, Paul Daley, Mariavittoria Mangini, David Presti
- Release date: September 1, 2021 (CUFF.Docs)
- Running time: 1 hour, 29 minutes
- Country: Canada
- Language: English

Better Living Through Chemistry is a 2021 documentary film about the lives of psychedelic chemist Alexander Shulgin and his wife Ann Shulgin. It was written and directed by Connie Littlefield. The phrase "Better Living Through Chemistry" was once the slogan of DuPont, before being co-opted by the counterculture of the 1960s and becoming associated with psychedelic drugs.

== See also ==
- List of psychedelic documentaries
- Alexander Shulgin § Documentaries
- Hofmann's Potion: The Pioneers of LSD (2002)
