= Unraveling the Dream: Psychedelics, Awakening, and the Brain =

- Directed by: Jake Orthwein
- Written by: Jake Orthwein
- Produced by: Sam Harris, Jaron Lowenstein
- Edited by: Jake Orthwein
- Production company: Waking Up
- Distributed by: YouTube
- Release date: 2026
- Running time: 61 minutes
- Country: United States
- Language: English

Unraveling the Dream: Psychedelics, Awakening, and the Brain is a 2026 documentary about psychedelic drugs and how they affect consciousness. It was developed and presented by Sam Harris's Waking Up and was published freely on YouTube. The film was directed by filmmaker Jake Orthwein, produced by Sam Harris and Jaron Lowenstein, and featured original interviews with Anil Seth, Robin Carhart-Harris, and Shamil Chandaria. It includes discussion of Aldous Huxley and his 1954 book The Doors of Perception as well as discussion of theories about how psychedelics work. The documentary surpassed 600,000 views on YouTube within 2 weeks of being posted.

== See also ==
- List of psychedelic documentaries
