= Prophet of Ecstasy =

- Directed by: Karen Cho, Elias Varoutsos
- Written by: Charles Beaudette, Jeffrey Blatt, Lori Braun, Karen Cho
- Produced by: Lori Braun, Sergeo Kirby
- Starring: Gregg Lowe, Daniel Rindress-Kay, Stephanie Sy, Michael Clegg, Rick Doblin, Carina Leveriza-Franz, Bob McMillen, others
- Cinematography: Alexandre Bussière, Simon Lamarre-Ledoux
- Production company: Laurus Productions
- Distributed by: CBC
- Release date: 2026
- Running time: 1 hour, 45 minutes
- Country: Canada
- Language: English

Prophet of Ecstasy is a 2026 documentary film about Michael Clegg and his 1980s and early 1990s operation producing and selling MDMA ("Ecstasy"). Clegg's operation, also known as The Texas Group, is credited with popularizing MDMA as a recreational drug. The film stars Clegg, Carina Leveriza-Franz, Bob McMillen, Rick Doblin, and others.

== See also ==
- List of psychedelic documentaries
