= Hawaii series by Georgia O'Keeffe =

Painting and photography series by Georgia O'Keeffe

Hawaii series
- Hibiscus with Plumeria (1939, Smithsonian American Art Museum).
- Housed at: Georgia O'Keeffe Museum; Honolulu Museum of Art; Museum of Fine Arts, Boston; Smithsonian American Art Museum; Baltimore Museum of Art; Muscatine Art Center; Private collection
- Size (no. of items): 20 sketches 20 paintings 17 photographs

American artist Georgia O'Keeffe (1887–1986) created a series of sketches, paintings and photographs based on her more than nine-week visit to four of the Hawaiian Islands in the Territory of Hawaii in the summer of 1939. Her trip was part of an all-expenses-paid commercial art commission from the Philadelphia advertising firm N. W. Ayer & Son on behalf of the Hawaiian Pineapple Company, later known as Dole. The company arranged for O'Keeffe to paint two works, without any artistic restrictions, for a magazine advertising campaign for pineapple juice. Two of the paintings from this commission, Crab's Claw Ginger Hawaii and Pineapple Bud, were used in advertisements that appeared in popular American magazines in 1940. Her photos of Hawaii, all from the island of Maui, are said to be her first major works in that medium up to that point.

The exhibition of O'Keeffe's complete Hawaii series of paintings, comprising tropical flowers, landscapes, and cultural artifacts, has only been shown together in their entirety once, appearing in O'Keeffe's original showing at An American Place from February 1 to March 17, 1940, which was positively received by critics at the time. The original exhibition led to the sale of one work, Cup of Silver Ginger, which contemporaneously entered the collection of the Baltimore Museum of Art. Subsequent public exhibitions in 1990, 2013, and 2018, have shown only part of the series due to six of the paintings in the series being held in disparate public and private collections. In 2021, O'Keeffe's Hawaii photos from the series were first shown in a traveling exhibition dedicated solely to her photography.

== Background ==
Georgia O'Keeffe was raised on a large, rural dairy farm in Sun Prairie, Wisconsin, in the late 19th century. Her exposure to nature contributed to her artistic development at a young age. O'Keeffe's mother educated and encouraged her daughters to study art. O'Keeffe studied art at a Catholic girls' high school, where she first focused on larger images in her paintings in response to a nun who criticized a drawing of two hands she had made as tiny and out of proportion. After high school, she took life drawing classes at the School of the Art Institute of Chicago under John Vanderpoel, whose impact would stay with her throughout her life. She left the school after she came down with typhoid, forcing her to recover at home for a time. By 1907, O'Keeffe was well enough to begin studying at the Art Students League in New York with William Merritt Chase, who taught his students to work quickly and to create a new painting each day.

She won a scholarship in 1908, but financial problems caused O'Keeffe to leave art school and move to Chicago in late 1908, where she worked as a commercial artist. She took freelance commercial commissions in the fashion advertisement industry and corporate and business commissions in Chicago and New York, drawing lace and embroidery designs for women's clothing advertisements, often for 12 hours at a time, six days a week. Her job required illustrators to quickly produce work for daily newspaper deadlines, and there was no end to job opportunities for those who could keep up. It was often rumored that O'Keeffe was the uncredited designer of the logo for Old Dutch Cleanser. O'Keeffe later credited Chase for teaching her to paint quickly, a skill that was useful in the fast-paced commercial art world. O'Keeffe was not happy with working in advertising to the exclusion of all else, nor was she fond of the teeming city of Chicago, with its harsh winters and polluted air.

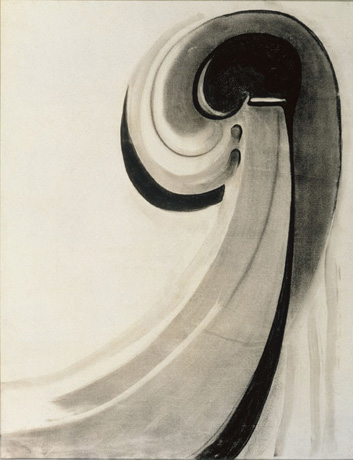
Early Abstraction (1915)

O'Keeffe came down with the measles in 1910, leaving her vision too weak to continue illustrating advertisements. This forced her to recover with her family, who were now living in Virginia, putting an end to her commercial pursuits. She stopped painting at this point, realizing her academic study had only taken her so far. O'Keeffe recalled: "I began to realize that a lot of people had done this same kind of painting before I came along. It had been done and I didn't think I could do it any better." She enrolled in drawing classes at the University of Virginia, Charlottesville, in 1912. Noticing O'Keeffe was no longer painting, her sister Anita invited her to take classes from Alon Bement who was training students to teach art to children. Bement relied on the Dow Method, the artistic approach of his mentor, Arthur Wesley Dow, a mostly unknown artist and arts educator innovator. O'Keeffe attended courses by Dow at Teachers College, Columbia University, in New York in 1914, embracing Dow's philosophy to "produce original work" and "fill a space in a beautiful way". O'Keeffe taught art at Columbia College in South Carolina in 1915.

At the age of 28, she made the rash decision to destroy all of her existing artwork, concluding it was too derivative. (Note: Dead Rabbit with Copper Pot escaped O'Keeffe's destruction of all of her early work in 1915 only because it was held by the Art Students League.) Going in an entirely new direction, O'Keeffe put her color palette aside for several years and worked in black and white, using charcoal to create original abstract expressionist works. Sharing her new style with Anita Pollitzer, O'Keeffe swore her to secrecy. Pollitzer instead shared them with photographer Alfred Stieglitz (1864–1946). Stieglitz showed O'Keeffe's work at his gallery in 1916, giving her an entire show to herself the next year. They soon married in 1924. Stieglitz was opposed to commercial art, and his position created friction between the two of them. O'Keeffe's increasing use of bright and radiant colors attracted attention with her Fifty Recent Paintings exhibition in 1926. O'Keeffe was approached by Edward Bernays on behalf of the Cheney Brothers Silk Manufacturing Company, commissioning her to create five paintings of flowers paired with silk women's clothing styles. Her paintings were reproduced as posters and window displays to promote Cheney Brothers fashion in retail stores.

== Ayer commission ==
By the late 1930s, O'Keeffe was highly productive and sought after, and her profile as an artist had reached a crescendo with multiple exhibitions and mixed, yet positive reviews. In April 1936, she and Stieglitz moved into the Arno penthouse at 405 East Fifty-fourth Street. Months later, Elizabeth Arden, then one of the wealthiest women in the world, commissioned O'Keeffe to paint Jimson Weed (1936) for her Gymnasium Moderne, a New York salon and fitness center. In 1937, Steuben Glass Works invited 27 artists, including O'Keeffe, Henri Matisse, Isamu Noguchi, and Salvador Dalí, to design crystal works for the company. O'Keeffe took the commission, designing a jimsonweed flower (Note: See Steuben Glass Bowl with Jimson Weed Image, 1938. Georgia O'Keeffe Museum. CR 947) which was etched on a crystal bowl.

By February 1938, Life magazine was calling O'Keeffe "America's most famous and successful woman artist". In May of that same year, she received an honorary doctorate from the College of William & Mary, which was arranged by Earl B. Thomas, an old friend of O'Keeffe's who was now working for Philadelphia advertising firm N. W. Ayer & Son as an executive. Ayer was commissioning famous artists for their clients, bringing fine art to commercial advertisements. Ayer represented the Hawaiian Pineapple Company account, and Thomas would soon make O'Keeffe an offer to join their campaign. By July, O'Keeffe told friend and fellow artist William Einstein that she was considering taking the commission.

In the 1930s, Ayer art director Charles T. Coiner was partly responsible for the popularity of marketing fine art with commercial products, particularly for clients like DeBeers, Steinway & Sons, and the Container Corporation of America. (Note: For a detailed history of Coiner's role and the evolution, development, and marketing of fine art in corporate advertising, see art historian Harris, Neil (1990). Cultural Excursions: Marketing Appetites and Cultural Tastes in Modern America. University of Chicago Press. pp. 368–372. ISBN 9780226317588. OCLC 20491867. Quote: "By 1930 [Coiner] was outlining his ideas in the pages of the most sophisticated journal of American commercial art...which signaled the beginning of a new cosmopolitanism in American advertising art...A new kind of corporate art patron had emerged...Coiner and other art directors now found willing clients for fine graphic artists...The rapidity and comprehensiveness of the movement that joined art with advertising and then went on to systematic corporate patronage was breathtaking. Almost nonexistent in the mid 1930s, it was so well established by 1946 that it evoked a number of significant commentaries, including a seminal essay written by Walter Abell, a faculty member at Michigan State University.") Coiner hired modern artists to persuade customers of the quality of purchasing products made by Ayer's clients in high-end magazine advertisements. In 1932, Hawaiian Pineapple (later known as Dole) had come close to bankruptcy during the Great Depression. To get out of the red, they spent $1.5 million on advertising, using famous artists to generate interest in their product.

Coiner took the Dole account in 1933, making changes to their advertising strategy. Before coming to Ayer, Dole focused on the health and nutrition of pineapple. Coiner turned this around and changed the product attention to Hawaii itself. Japanese-American painter Yasuo Kuniyoshi and California Scene painter Millard Sheets were matched with Hawaiian Pineapple Company advertisements. Coiner next invited American artist Isamu Noguchi and modernist painter Georgia O'Keeffe to join the campaign. In the summer of 1938, O'Keeffe was offered an all-expenses paid, nine-week trip to the territory of Hawaii as a commercial art commission for the Hawaiian Pineapple Company. In exchange, O'Keeffe agreed to produce two paintings without artistic restrictions for a magazine advertising campaign for canned pineapple juice. O'Keeffe was hesitant at first, but Coiner managed to convince her to take the commission.

== Voyage to Hawaii ==
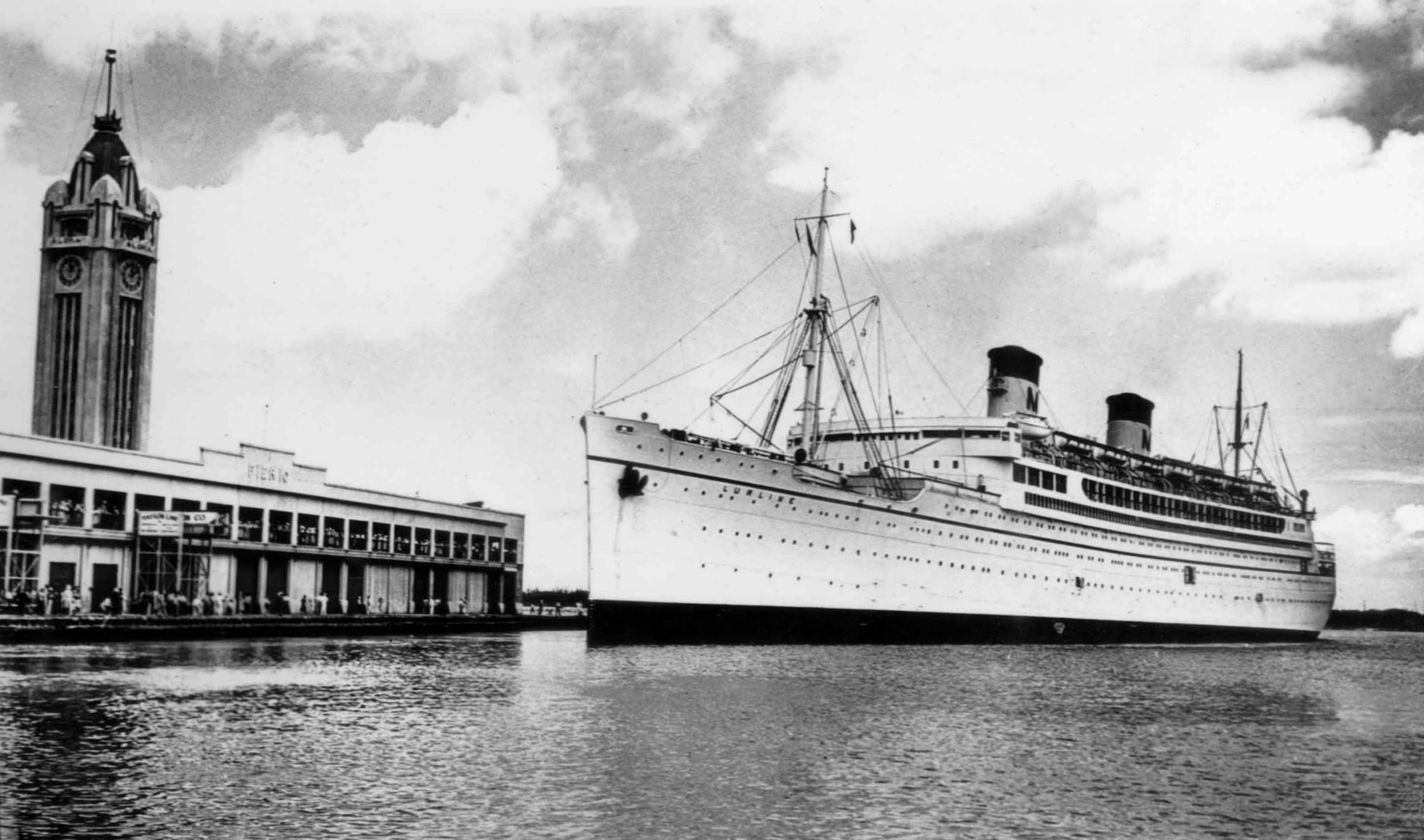
SS Lurline in Honolulu in the 1930s. Aloha Tower is visible to the left.

Before traveling to the Territory of Hawaii, O'Keeffe's knowledge of the islands came mostly from travel brochures designed for tourists, preconceived ideas that O'Keeffe would have to master to create an original artistic approach and vision about Hawaii in her work. By late January 1939, O'Keeffe finished hanging her annual exhibition of paintings at An American Place, Stieglitz's largest gallery. The showing, Georgia O'Keeffe: Exhibition of Oils and Pastels, ran from January 22 to March 17. It featured 22 paintings in her absence, as she departed for Hawaii a week after the exhibition opened. She left for the Hawaii Territory on January 30 from Grand Central Station in Manhattan. After arriving in San Francisco, O'Keeffe boarded the SS Lurline, a Matson luxury cruise ship, on February 3. The ship took her to Oahu, arriving in Honolulu on February 8. The entire trip, from New York to Hawaii, took her nine days.

== Arrival, interisland travel ==
O'Keeffe's ship arrived at Honolulu Harbor on February 8, 1939. She was met by a representative from Ayer (thought to be John S. Coonley) who took a tender out to the boat. Helen Richards, the wife of Atherton Richards, president and manager of Hawaiian Pineapple, waited for O'Keeffe on the dock. Both Coonley and Richards brought O'Keeffe traditional flower leis as a greeting, which greatly impressed her. After her arrival, O'Keeffe checked into the Moana Hotel in Waikīkī as a guest. In a radio postal telegraph to Stieglitz soon after, she writes: "Arrived this morning feeling fine. Lovely summer weather here. Hope you are alright."

O'Keeffe spent almost four of the nine weeks in the territory of Hawaii on the island of Oahu. A few days after her arrival, O'Keeffe is thought to have taken a day trip in a car to East Oahu, viewing the cliffs at Makapuʻu, continuing along the windward cliffs of the Nuʻuanu Pali, taking in the sights of the rainforest and waterfalls, and spending some time at the Foster Botanical Garden. It was not until eight days (Note: O'Keeffe later claimed she waited two weeks to visit the pineapple plantation, but Saville traced her letters and postmarks and discovered it was, in fact, eight days.) after her initial arrival that she was first taken to a pineapple plantation. She wrote to Steiglitz telling him that she had expected to visit the plantation on her first or second day. O'Keeffe wanted to live among the workers on the Dole plantation to best capture the images for her commission, but Ayer refused to allow it. "O'Keeffe insisted on staying in the village where the pineapple workers lived, to avoid making the long round-trip drive there every day", writes art historian Michele H. Bogart. "Taken aback, the representative tried to explain that local custom would not permit such a close association between an upper-class white woman and native workers."

Art historian Sascha Scott notes that as a wealthy white woman, O'Keeffe's request "flew in the face of Hawaiian social, racial, and gender hierarchies", particularly in 1939, as the racial tensions of the 1932 Massie Trial in Honolulu were still fresh. The company was also unable to provide adequate samples of a pineapple plant for O'Keeffe to paint. Angered by this treatment, the story goes, O'Keeffe did not paint a pineapple in Hawaii—the entire purpose of her visit—until she returned home to New York. These narrative accounts of O'Keeffe's failure to paint the fruit are popular in the literature, but may not be historically accurate. Curator Theresa Papanikolas believes that O'Keeffe's letters indicate that she did attempt to paint a pineapple while she was still in Hawaii. (Note: Much later, in 1980, Stieglitz's niece, artist Georgia Engelhard (1906–1986), would tell biographer Sarah Whitaker Peters (1924–2019) about O'Keeffe's process which often involved initially painting small objects from a model to get the motif in place, "working from realism to abstraction", and later finishing the work from memory based on their impressions.)

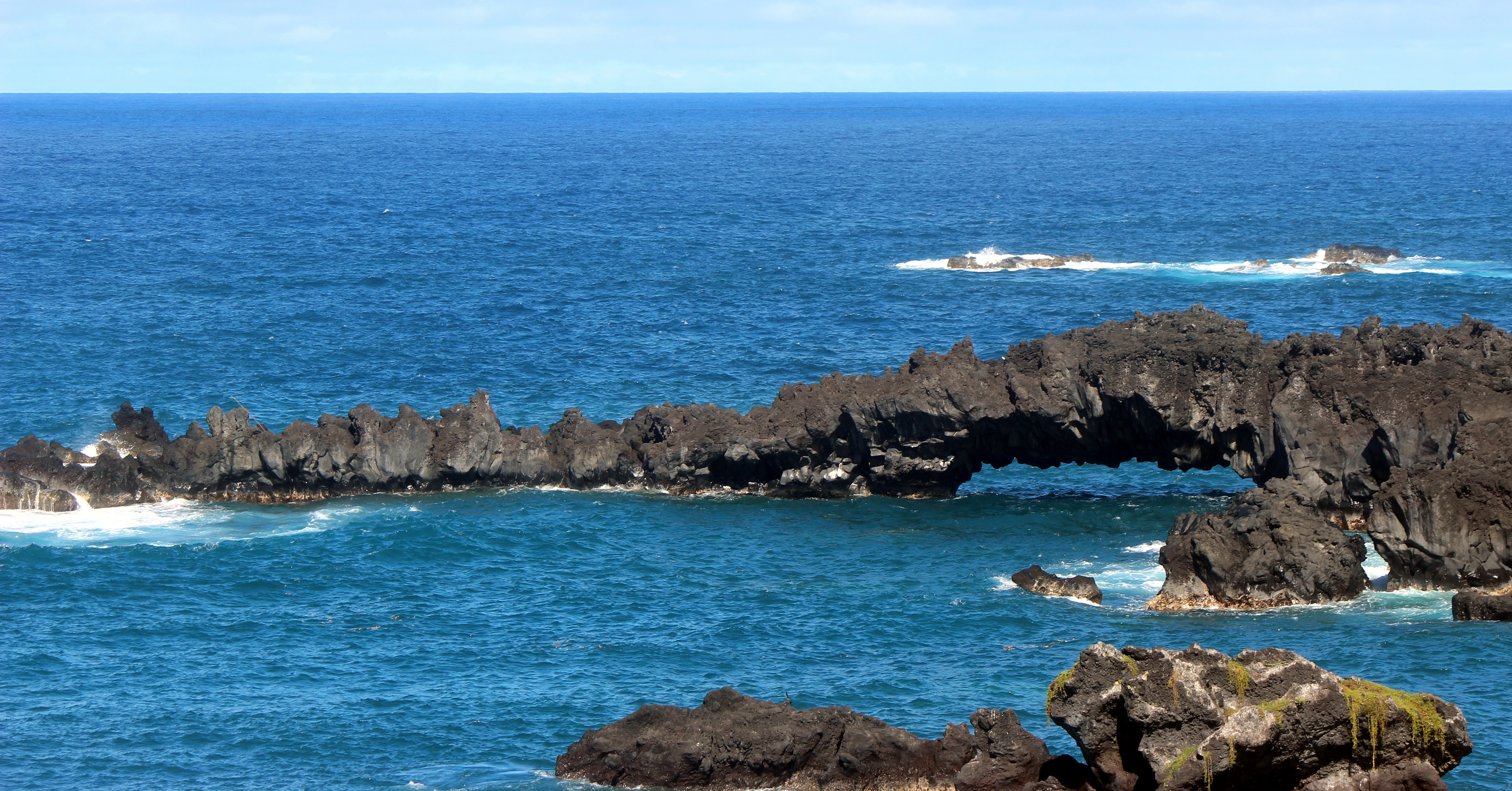
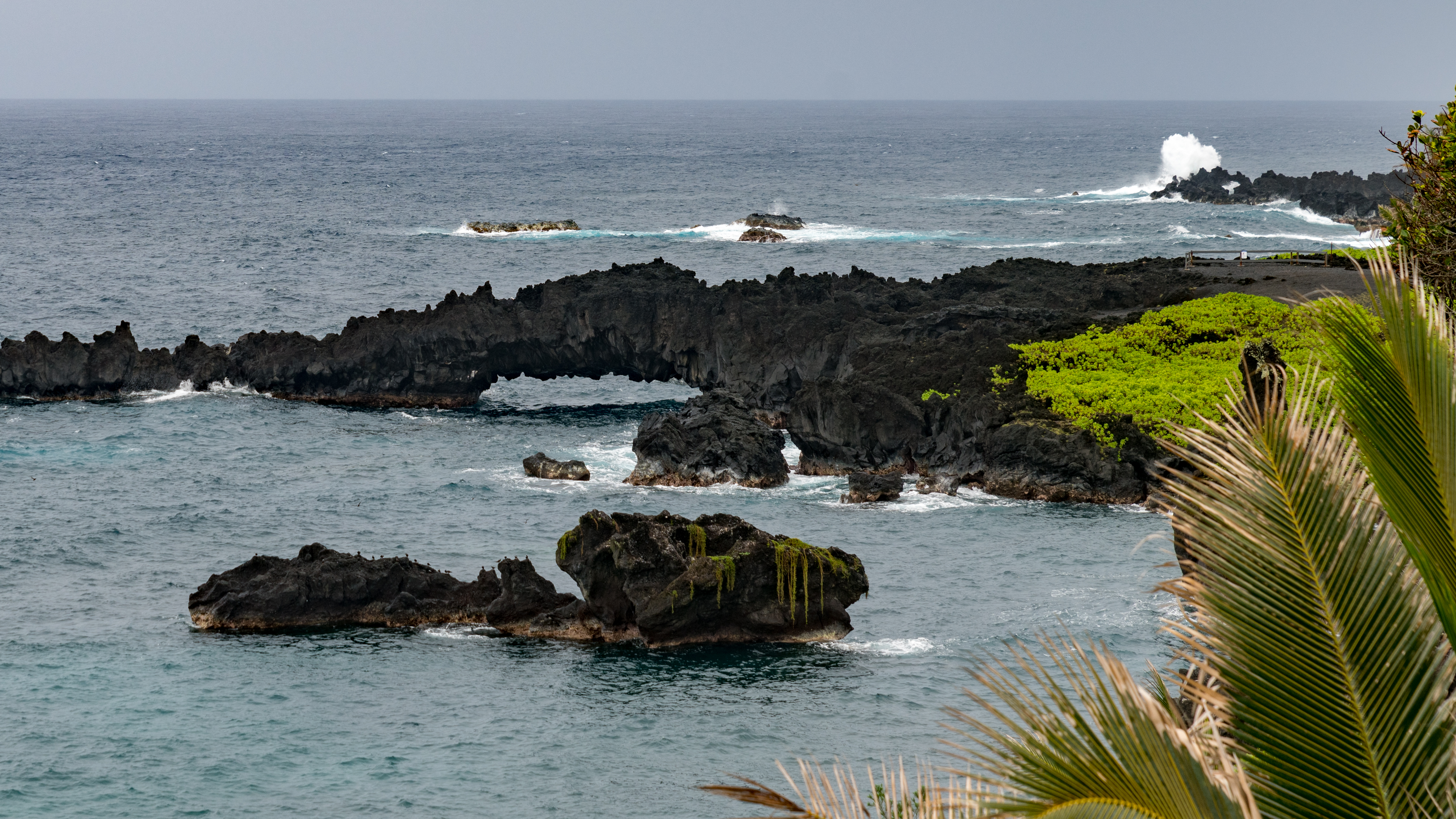
Lava "bridge"-like formation at Waiʻanapanapa State Park

On February 23, O'Keeffe visited the island of Kauai, spending two days visiting with artist Reuben Tam (1916–1991) in Kapaʻa. During her stay, she was hosted by Robert Allerton and John Gregg Allerton at the former Hawaiian Royal tropical estate, now known as the Allerton Garden. After flying back to Oahu and spending additional time there, O'Keeffe visited Maui on March 10, where she checked in to the Maui Grand Hotel in Wailuku as a guest.

Artist Robert Lee Eskridge (1891–1975) arranged for Willis Jennings, the manager of the Kaeleku Sugar Company plantation, to host O'Keeffe at their plantation house in Hana. His 12-year-old daughter, Patricia Jennings, took O'Keeffe on a week-long, guided tour of the island. In Hana, they visited an area now known as Waiʻanapanapa State Park, where O'Keeffe painted two landscapes (Black Lava Bridge). On the road to Kipahulu, O'Keeffe spotted a flowering shrub that she thought resembled jimsonweed, her "favorite flower". Patricia told O'Keeffe the locals referred to it as "belladonna". O'Keeffe asked her to pick some flower samples. That afternoon, back in the Jennings' guest cottage, O'Keeffe painted Bella Donna. O'Keeffe's visit to the island of Maui continued to the Leinaʻala Valley, where she painted for three days, producing five paintings (Waterfall, Papaw Tree), using the Jennings' station wagon as a studio, just as she did in New Mexico. Her visit later continued to Haleakalā crater.

On March 28, she left Maui for the Big Island on an interisland steamboat that arrived in Hilo the next day. She was met by her hosts, the Shipman family, who took her on a tour of a black sand beach, and later Kīlauea, where she stayed at the Volcano House. The next day, she traveled to Kona, and spent the remainder of her time there on the west side. In Kona, she became lifelong friends with Richard G. Pritzlaff, a fellow New Mexican, where O'Keeffe had been spending her summers since 1929. Pritzlaff was a breeder of Arabian horses, Chow Chow dogs, and peacocks. After Stieglitz's death in 1946, O'Keeffe would later permanently move to Abiquiú. In 1952, Pritzlaff gave O'Keeffe her first two Chows, Bo and Chia, as a present, the beginning of her long fascination with the breed who were often seen in her company in New Mexico. She returned to Honolulu on April 10 to prepare for her departure to the mainland.

== Departure and return ==
O'Keeffe left Hawaii on April 14, 1939, traveling on the ocean liner SS Matsonia back to San Francisco, after which she took a train to New York. After returning, she resumed her normal routine throughout May, but soon began experiencing serious health problems. O'Keeffe suffered from what she described as exhaustion. In a letter to art critic Henry McBride (1867–1962) dated July 22, 1939, she writes that she had been seeing a physician three times a week and had remained mostly bedridden for the previous six weeks. She described symptoms of "stomach problems, headaches, and weight loss".

Meanwhile, the commission for Dole Pineapple loomed large. O'Keeffe began painting, and by June or July she completed two works: Crab's Claw Ginger Hawaii, an image of a lobster claw heliconia, and Papaw Tree, Īao Valley, Maui, an image of a papaya tree. Both were submitted to Ayer to fulfill the commission for the canned pineapple juice ads. She did not go to New Mexico that year, and she stopped painting entirely until October. For the remainder of her life, O'Keeffe never wrote or spoke about her 1939 paintings in and about Hawaii outside of her original exhibition statement at An American Place in 1940. In that commentary, she implied that her brief, nine-week visit to Hawaii was too short.

O'Keeffe later wrote about returning to Hawaii for a second trip and reflected on how much she enjoyed her first visit. In 1958, she wrote a letter to Ansel Adams, telling him that her two best experiences were going to Yosemite with him in 1938 and visiting Hawaii in 1939. She eventually returned to Maui in May 1982, visiting the island with Juan Hamilton and his family.

== Advertisements ==
1940 Dole Pineapple Juice ad featuring Pineapple Bud

Although it was never demanded or specified that O'Keeffe would produce a painting featuring a pineapple, her two submissions featuring a heliconia flower and a papaya tree caused some confusion. Ayer art director Charles T. Coiner recalled that O'Keeffe "came back with all kinds of beautiful paintings but nothing to do with pineapple...I said, 'I wonder if you couldn't paint the pineapple flower.'" O'Keeffe explained to Coiner what had happened and how she was prevented from painting the pineapple by Dole and how she was provided with a terrible specimen unfit for painting. Coiner quickly made arrangements to send her a viable plant. In less than two days, Coiner had a new pineapple plant shipped by plane from Hawaii to New York for O'Keeffe to paint. Sometime between June and July, O'Keeffe eventually completed her commission, producing Crab's Claw Ginger Hawaii and Pineapple Bud for Dole to use in their advertisements. Her previous submission candidate, Papaw Tree, Īao Valley, Maui, a painting of a papaya tree, was rejected by Dole because their direct competitor at the time produced papaya juice.

Two separate print advertisements for Dole Pineapple Juice used two different paintings to accompany the ads. Crab's Claw Ginger Hawaii was published first, appearing in The Saturday Evening Post in April 1940, and a year later in Vogue in February 1941. Pineapple Bud was the second painting used in an advertisement, first appearing in Ladies' Home Journal in October 1940, (Note: "First Showing: A Dole Pineapple Bud from Hawaii". Ladies' Home Journal. 57 (10): 61. October 1940.) followed by its use in Woman's Home Companion in November of that same year. Crab's Claw Ginger Hawaii shows an image of a red heliconia in close view with the ocean in the background along the bottom; an island can be seen along the horizon with low-lying clouds. The text accompanying the ad using Crab's Claw Ginger Hawaii reads in part: "Hospitable Hawaii cannot send you its abundance of flowers or its sunshine. But it sends you something reminiscent of both—golden, fragrant Dole Pineapple Juice."

The ad for Pineapple Bud shows a framed painting of a close-up of a small, newly formed pineapple surrounded by its leaves. The ad presents this image in the context of art as a "First Showing: A Dole Pineapple Bud from Hawaii". The text at the bottom of the ad reads in part: "Perhaps you have never seen a pineapple bud—and words cannot describe the glowing crater of color which on the Dole plantations grows and ripens into a luscious big pineapple...Perhaps you have never tasted Dole Pineapple Juice—and there is no other way to discover the fragrant, zestful goodness of this pure juice."

== Paintings ==
O'Keeffe's ad hoc digital catalogue raisonné indicates that she completed a total of 44 works in 1939, of which 23 were drawings and 21 were oil paintings. Within the Hawaii series, 20 of these drawings are preliminary sketches and 20 are paintings. Of those 20 paintings, there are eleven of flowers, seven showing Hawaii landscapes, and two depicting cultural artifacts. It is not entirely clear which paintings were completed in Hawaii and which were finished on the mainland in New York, but O'Keeffe acknowledged this distinction in her original 1940 exhibition statement. (Note: "Some of them were painted in Hawaii, some were painted here in New York from drawings or memories of things brought home.")

Previously, art historians like Lisa Messinger have dismissed O'Keeffe's Hawaii paintings as "very beautiful", but of "secondary importance" because they were perceived as formulaic and lacking innovation. Messinger considers O'Keeffe's Maui paintings as some of her best of the Hawaii period, with Bella Donna as her crowning achievement in the series. Art historian Sascha Scott views O'Keeffe's Hawaii series as part of a larger discourse rooted in the history of colonialism, given the complex interrelationship between the Dole family, the history of agriculture in Hawaii, and the hostile overthrow of the Hawaiian Kingdom. O'Keeffe later returned to Hawaii-related subjects in her work twice: with a painting of a bromeliad in Leaves of a Plant (1942) and a heliconia in Not from My Garden (1967).

=== Flowers ===
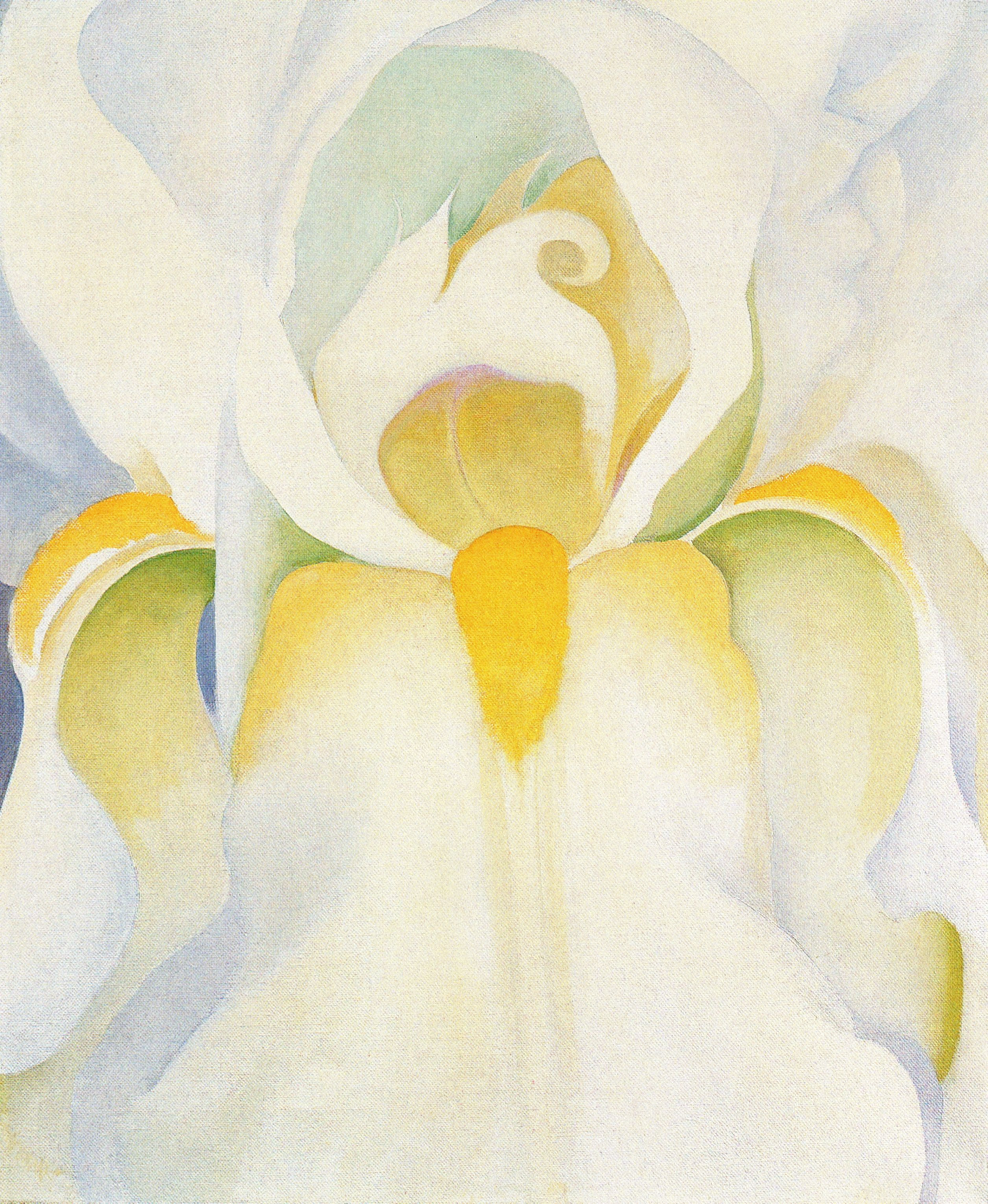
Untitled (White Iris) (1926)

Art historians believe that the flowers depicted in Bella Donna with Pink Torch Ginger Bud and White Lotus were already familiar to O'Keeffe before she visited Hawaii, indicating that she was staying within her comfort zone, painting what she knew at first. The painting of Bella Donna features the hybrid ornamental Brugmansia × candida, commonly known as angel's trumpet. Angel's trumpet is similar to Datura, a flower which O'Keeffe had an affinity for in her past work, notably appearing in Jimson Weed (1936); O'Keeffe even grew the flower in her New Mexico garden.

White Lotus shares a profile view that O'Keeffe previously used in Untitled (White Iris) (1926). Unlike most of her paintings, O'Keeffe altered the appearance of the lotus flower before painting it, a practice considered unusual for her style. Five of her Hawaii flower paintings continue her exploration of the color white, which she investigated in her paintings of shells, bones, and clouds. As O'Keeffe grew more comfortable with Hawaii, her work expanded into new territory. She found herself drawn to the White Bird of Paradise, writing about her fascination with its colorful flowers in several letters. The intensity of her focus on these new tropical flowers increased over her stay, turning her attention to the large "waxy" redness of the Heliconia, the exotic, contrasting colors of the Pink Ornamental Banana, and yet, also revisiting her past success and familiar style with works like Cup of Silver Ginger.

Crab's Claw Ginger Hawaii was owned by Dole Company from 1940 to 1976. After that time, the work passed through 10 separate owners, finally settling with Laila and Thurston Twigg-Smith in 1988, where it remained for 33 years. In 2021, it was sold by their descendant Sharon Twigg-Smith at Phillips for more than $7.7 million. After Hibiscus appeared at the original exhibition in 1940, it disappeared into private collections. Saville traced it to the collection of Alice and Fred Rubin, noting in her catalog that it shared qualities with O'Keeffe's work depicting flowers at close range in the 1920s, but was unable to borrow it for the 1990 exhibition. Eight years after Saville's exhibition, Hibiscus showed up in 1998 at a gallery in Memphis, then disappeared into private hands again. Papanikolas was unable to find the painting in time for the 2018 exhibition, but just days after it opened in New York City, Hibiscus appeared at auction, where it sold for US$4.8 million.

=== Landscapes ===
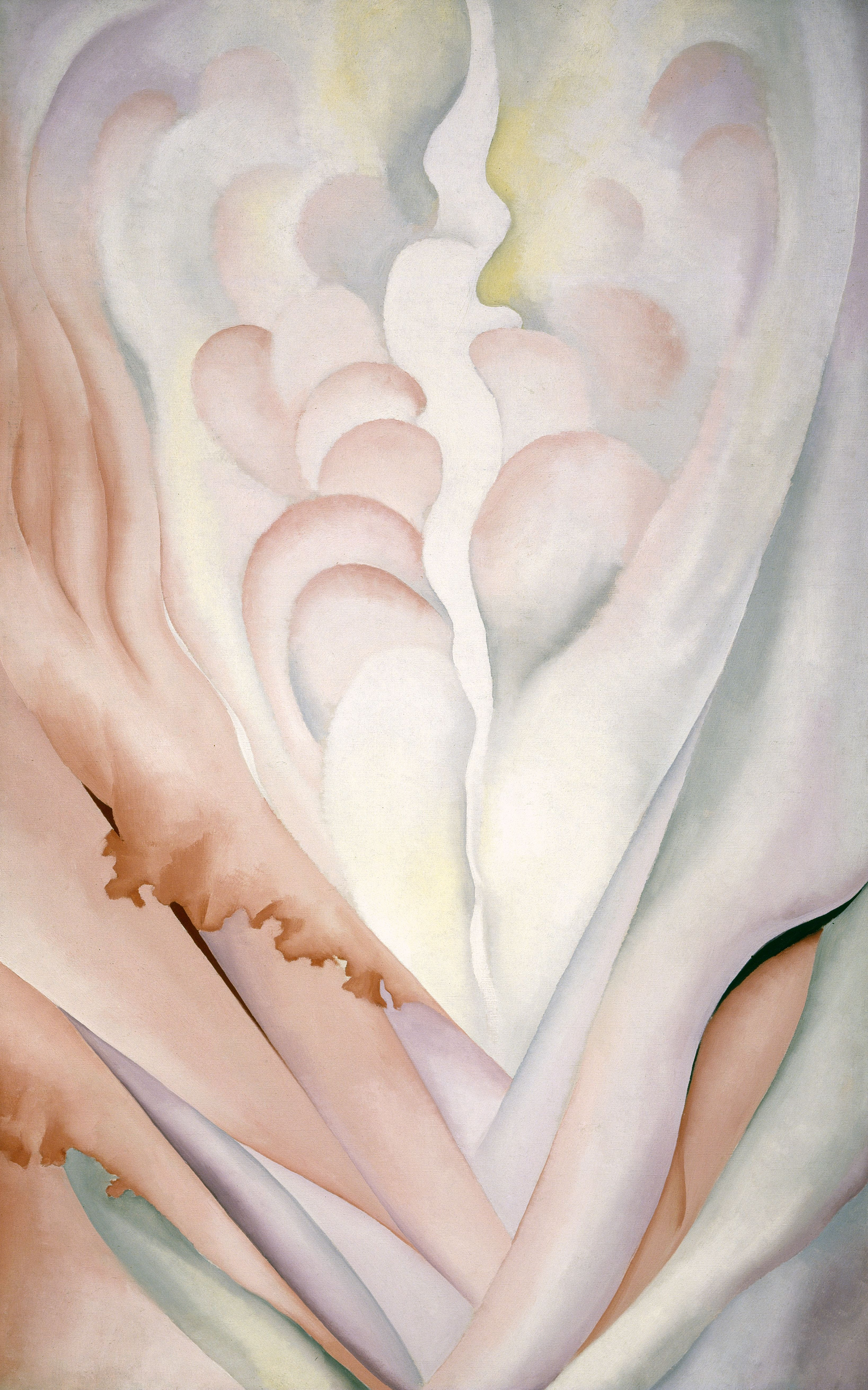
Flower Abstraction (1924)

On Maui, O'Keeffe painted two seascapes in Hana featuring lava formations that spilled out to the ocean. Black Lava Bridge, Hana Coast, No. I and No. II depict what she described as the meeting of "the lava and the sea" near Leho'ula Beach, "a beautiful strip of black lava stretching out into the sea—worn under in one spot so it was like a bridge." To capture the scene, O'Keeffe had to hike into a precarious area filled with sharp lava rocks and pounding surf. Both works are more sketch-like than her other paintings, revealing that they were created directly outdoors. The Hawaii seascapes were her first in almost two decades since her paintings in Maine (Blue Sea with Rocks, 1922; Blue Wave Maine, 1927).

O'Keffee painted for three days in late March in the ʻĪao Valley, producing five paintings. She talked about the experience in letters to Stieglitz and Ettie Stettheimer. Her guide, Patricia Jennings, witnessed O'Keeffe painting the four-part waterfall series and wrote about it, a somewhat rare event as O'Keeffe did not normally let people watch her paint. The first three paintings in the waterfall series (No. I, No. II, No. III) feature the same waterfall on the north side of the valley. The fourth work in the series, End of Road, features an entirely different scene from another part of the valley. The waterfalls were made possible by a period of heavy rain, requiring O'Keeffe to paint inside a car for cover in the backseat with Jennings watching.

Art critic Elizabeth McCausland noted the similarity between the color green O'Keeffe used to paint the ʻĪao Valley and the green she used for the mountains of New Mexico, while also observing how the paintings were completely different due to their "light and atmosphere" unique to their respective places. In the waterfall series, O'Keeffe returned to the bisected V motif found in earlier works like Inside Red Canna (1919), Flower Abstraction (1924), and Small Purple Hills (1934). After the Hawaii series, she continued to return to this motif in Black Place I (1944) and other work.

The fifth painting depicts a papaya tree with the ʻĪao Valley in the background. Before coming to Hawaii, O'Keeffe had already painted numerous trees. In the 1920s, she painted maple and chestnut trees at her husband's summer house in Lake George, as well as The Lawrence Tree (1929) in Taos. In the late 1930s, she depicted a dead cedar at Ghost Ranch in the work Gerald's Tree I (1937). Throughout the 1940s and 1950s, she continued to paint trees in New Mexico, particularly cottonwoods.

=== Cultural artifacts ===
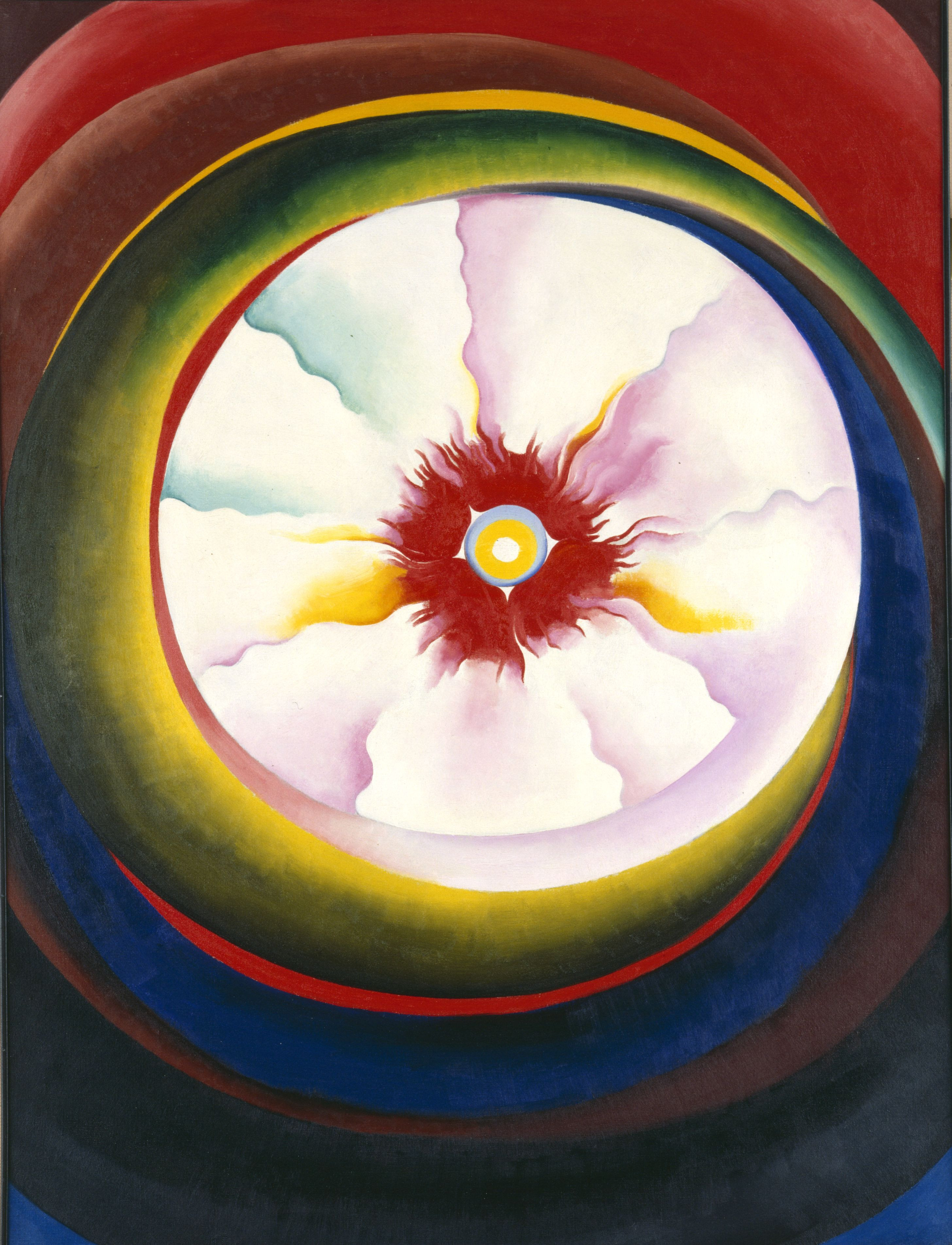
At the Rodeo, New Mexico (1929)

Fishing and fishing symbols play a significant role in the culture of Hawaii. O'Keeffe's two paintings of fishhooks important to Native Hawaiians follow similar themes in her prior work depicting artifacts of the indigenous peoples of the North American Southwest, particularly the Hopi and the Puebloans of New Mexico (At the Rodeo, New Mexico, 1929; Kachina, 1934; Eagle Claw and Bean Necklace, 1934). The Fishhook from Hawaii series shows a feather jig, a type of weighted fishing lure used for trolling, connected to a coiled leader, the front section of the fishing line connected to a hook, and a fishing swivel. Both paintings show the fishhooks floating above the water with a boundless horizon in the distance. O'Keeffe used this floating motif several years earlier in From the Faraway, Nearby (1937), which shows a deer skull and antlers hovering over a desert, a work that O'Keeffe believed captured the heart of the Southwest.

Art critic Henry McBride and curator Jennifer Saville both argue that O'Keeffe treated the fishhooks series in the same way as she did the works symbolizing the Southwest, attempting to also get to the heart of Hawaii with her paintings. Saville notes that in the fishhook series, O'Keeffe makes use of her void motif, once again exploring empty space as she previously did in Lake George and Woods (1922), as well as spiraling motifs found in At the Rodeo, New Mexico and Pink Shell with Seaweed (1938), continuing with Goat's Horn with Red (1945) years later. Saville believes the fishhook series serves as a transitional piece between O'Keeffe's early paintings in New Mexico and her later pelvic bone series in the 1940s. The fishhook paintings received positive reviews from art critics in the New York World-Telegram and The New York Sun in 1940. Fishhook From Hawaii, No. 1 was bequested to the Brooklyn Museum in 1987 after O'Keeffe's death. Her early retrospective exhibition was first held by the Brooklyn Museum in 1927. Fishhook From Hawaii, No. 2 was gifted to the Alfred Stieglitz Collection at the Boston Museum of Fine Arts in 1987, also after her death.

== Photographs ==
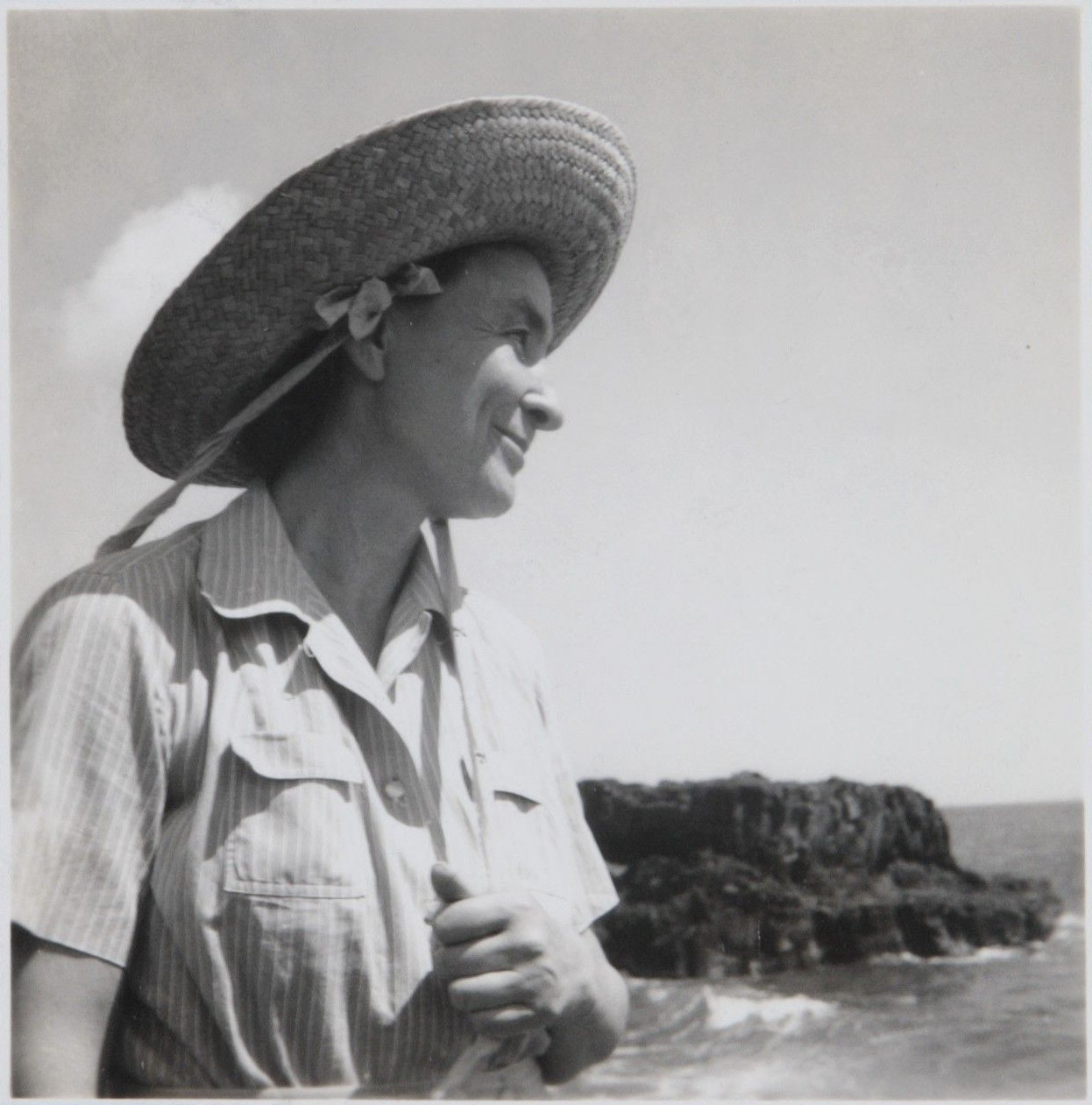
O'Keeffe in Hana, March 1939 (Harold Stein)

On the island of Maui, amateur photographer Harold Stein captured three photographs of O'Keeffe standing in front of the Hana landforms she painted (Georgia O'Keeffe in Hawaii). O'Keeffe borrowed Stein's camera to produce an additional 17 (Note: O'Keeffe only took 17 photos, all on the island of Maui. Three additional photos (Georgia O'Keeffe in Hawaii) were captured by Harold Stein, a Boy Scout leader and amateur photographer, who also served as a guide and driver for O'Keeffe when she visited the island of Maui.) photographs of Maui, including flowers (Fence Morning Glory), landscapes (Sugar Cane Fields and Clouds), and cultural artifacts (Canoe Shed at Wai'anapanapa Black Sand Beach). Stein printed the negatives on Kodak Velox F photographic paper. Each photo in the series measures less than 3 by 3 inches (7.6 cm). Before 1939, O'Keeffe took a few photographs, but the "Hawaii snaps" (as she called them) are considered her first major, cohesive works in that medium (Note: Lisa Volpe: "O'Keeffe's snaps from Hawaii are her first significant body of photographs.") up to that point in her career.

One notable technique O'Keeffe brought to photography was the experimental method of "reframing", changing the position of the camera in each shot to arrange the elements in a unique way, resulting in different compositions of the same scene. It is believed that O'Keeffe came to this method through the instructional techniques of her teacher Arthur Wesley Dow, as it notably shows up in her Hawaii series, such as Lava Arch, Wai'anapanapa State Park and Natural Stone Arch near Leho‘ula Beach, ‘Aleamai, but also in her paintings more than a decade earlier (Shell and Old Shingle, 1926) as well as in photos almost two decades later (Garage Vigas and Studio Door, 1956; Road, 1957; White House Overlook, 1957). In his influential book, Composition: A Series of Exercises in Art Structure for the Use of Students and Teachers (1899), Dow notably taught his students to "Try only to cut a space finely by landscape shapes; the various lines in your subject combine to enclose spaces, and the art in your composition will lie in placing these spaces in good relations to each other."

== Exhibitions ==
O'Keeffe's Hawaii paintings have been exhibited together, in whole or in part, four times, initially by O'Keeffe herself in 1940. In the intervening five decades, many of the paintings appeared by themselves at exhibitions, but were not all shown together as six of the works are held in private collections throughout the United States. Curator James Jensen (1950–2017), of what was then known as the Honolulu Academy of Arts, was the first to propose the idea of a new Hawaii exhibition of O'Keeffe's work in the late 1980s. Jennifer Saville, then assistant curator, organized the first exhibition in 1990, which was followed by two separate exhibitions curated by Theresa Papanikolas in 2013 and later in 2018. Curator Lisa Volpe organized an exhibition that included O'Keeffe's Hawaii photographs in 2021.

O'Keeffe's original exhibition of the Hawaii series was shown at her annual exhibition at An American Place from February 1 to March 17, 1940. Two additional unfinished works in the series, Untitled (Hibiscus) and Untitled (Yellow Flower), were not included. The exhibition was well received by both the public and critics, leading to the sale of Cup of Silver Ginger to the Baltimore Museum of Art. Time magazine published a positive review of the exhibition along with a photo of O'Keeffe smiling in front of her painting of Pineapple Bud. The magazine called her "the least commercial artist in the U.S." and praised the four paintings in the ʻĪao Valley waterfall series as the "best sequence" at the showing, noting that the most expensive paintings were priced as high as $4,000 ($91,924 in 2025).

In 1990, Saville was able to gather 18 of the 20 Hawaii paintings for the Georgia O'Keeffe: Paintings of Hawaiʻi exhibition at the Honolulu Academy of Arts from March 22 through May 6, celebrating the fiftieth anniversary of the original showing at An American Place. Two paintings, Hibiscus and Pink Ornamental Banana, both in private collections, could not be obtained for the 1990 show. The exhibition was made possible by federal funding from the National Endowment for the Arts, state funding from the Hawai'i State Foundation on Culture and the Arts, and private support from Castle & Cooke.

In 2013, Papanikolas organized 12 of the 20 works from the series along with a joint showing of Ansel Adams' work in Hawaii at the Georgia O'Keeffe and Ansel Adams: The Hawaiʻi Pictures exhibition, also at the Honolulu Academy of Arts, from July 18 until January 12, 2014. In preparation for the show, conservators restored and preserved White Lotus. The exhibition traveled to the Georgia O'Keeffe Museum from February 7 to September 14, 2014. In 2018, Papanikolas also curated a showing of 17 of the 20 works in the Hawaii series at the Georgia O'Keeffe: Visions of Hawaiʻi exhibition at the New York Botanical Garden, along with a horticultural exhibition of Hawaiian plants and flowers from the Enid A. Haupt Conservatory, combined with cultural programs and performances from May 19 through October 28, after which it traveled to the Memphis Brooks Museum of Art from December 1 through February 24, 2019.

O'Keeffe's series of Hawaii photographs (plus photos of O'Keeffe by Harold Stein) were exhibited by the Museum of Fine Arts, Houston, in collaboration with the Georgia O'Keeffe Museum, in the 2021 touring exhibition Georgia O'Keeffe, Photographer.

== Plants of Hawaii ==
Although Hawaii is known for its native plant species, none of the flowers or plants depicted in O'Keeffe's paintings are endemic to Hawaii. The plants and flowers O'Keeffe painted represent introduced species that had been brought to the Hawaiian Islands over a period of 1500 years, initially by Polynesian voyagers in canoes, and much later, Europeans. (Note: Haupt Conservatory. "Likely unknown to the artist, many of the plants she encountered–and ultimately painted–were not native to the Hawaiian Islands, but had been introduced over the course of human habitation beginning approximately 1,500 years ago. Her depictions of hibiscus, plumeria, bird-of-paradise, and even banana–an ornamental variety–provide a snapshot of the tourist’s Hawai'i, and serve as a record of her initial exploration of her new surroundings.") Three of O'Keeffe's paintings, Pink Ornamental Banana, Bella Donna with Pink Torch Ginger Bud, and Hibiscus with Plumeria, depict multiple plant species.

List of introduced plant species in O'Keeffe's Hawaii series (Note: This list was authored by the New York Botanical Garden and the National Tropical Botanical Garden as part of the Georgia O'Keeffe: Visions of Hawai'i exhibition in 2018.)

No.	Plant image	Title of work depicting plant	Botanical name	English name	Hawaiian name	Introduced	Type
1	refer to caption	Heliconia	Heliconia spp.	Heliconia		Ornamental	Painting
2	refer to caption	Crab's Claw Ginger Hawaii	Heliconia spp.	Heliconia		Ornamental	Painting
3	refer to caption	Pink Ornamental Banana	Musa velutina	Pink banana	Mai'a	Canoe	Painting
	refer to caption		Zantedeschia aethiopica	Calla lilly		Ornamental	
4	refer to caption	Pineapple Bud	Ananas comosus	Pineapple	Hala kahiki	Agricultural	Painting
5	refer to caption	Bella Donna	Brugmansia × candida	Angel's trumpet	Nānāhonua	Ornamental	Painting
6	refer to caption	Bella Donna with Pink Torch Ginger Bud	Brugmansia × candida	Angel's trumpet	Nānāhonua	Ornamental	Painting
	refer to caption		Etlingera elatior	Pink torch ginger		Ornamental	
7	refer to caption	Hibiscus with Plumeria	Hibiscus rosa-sinensis	Chinese hibiscus		Ornamental	Painting
	refer to caption		Plumeria rubra	Plumeria	Melia	Ornamental	
8	refer to caption	Cup of Silver Ginger	Solandra grandiflora	Chalice vine		Ornamental	Painting
9	refer to caption	Hibiscus	Hibiscus rosa-sinensis	Chinese hibiscus		Ornamental	Painting
10	refer to caption	White Lotus	Nelumbo sp.	Lotus		Ornamental	Painting
11	refer to caption	White Bird of Paradise	Strelitzia nicolai	White bird of paradise		Ornamental	Painting
12	refer to caption	Papaw Tree, Īao Valley, Maui	Carica papaya	Papaya	Mīkana, hē'ī	Agricultural	Painting
13	refer to caption	Fence Morning Glory (Ipomoea ochracea)	Ipomoea ochracea	Fence morning glory		Ornamental	Photograph
14	refer to caption	Sugar Cane Fields and Clouds	Saccharum officinarum	Sugarcane	Kō	Canoe	Photograph

== Works ==
Grayed out text indicates an unfinished work in the series.

Paintings

- Fishhook from Hawaii – No. 1, 1939. Oil on canvas board, 18 × 14 inches (45.7 × 35.6 cm). Brooklyn Museum of Art. CR 960
- Fishhook from Hawaii, No. 2, 1939. Oil on canvas, 36 × 24 inches (91.4 × 61 cm). Museum of Fine Arts, Boston. CR 961
- Heliconia, 1939. Oil on canvas, 19 × 16 inches (48.3 × 40.6 cm). Private collection. CR 962
- Crab's Claw Ginger Hawaii, 1939. Oil on canvas, 19 × 16 inches (48.3 × 40.6 cm). Private collection. CR 963
- Pink Ornamental Banana, 1939. Oil on canvas, 19 × 16 inches (48.3 × 40.6 cm). Georgia O'Keeffe Museum. CR 964
- Pineapple Bud, 1939. Oil on canvas, 19 × 16 inches (48.3 × 40.6 cm). Private collection. CR 965
- Bella Donna, 1939. Oil on canvas, 36 1/4 × 30 1/8 inches (91.4 × 76.2 cm). Georgia O'Keeffe Museum. Extended loan. Private collection. CR 966
- Bella Donna with Pink Torch Ginger Bud, 1939. Oil on canvas, 19 × 16 inches (48.3 × 40.6 cm). Private collection. CR 967
- Hibiscus with Plumeria, 1939. Oil on canvas, 40 × 30 inches (101.6 × 76.2 cm). Smithsonian American Art Museum. CR 968
- Cup of Silver Ginger, 1939. Oil on canvas, 19 3/16 × 16 1/8 inches (48.7 × 41 cm). Baltimore Museum of Art. CR 969
- Untitled (Hibiscus), 1939. Oil on canvas, 18 7/8 x 15 7/8 inches (47.9 × 40.1 cm). Georgia O'Keeffe Museum. CR 970
- Hibiscus, 1939. Oil on canvas, 19 × 16 inches (48.3 × 40.6 cm). Private collection. CR 971
- White Lotus, 1939. Oil on canvas, 20 × 22 inches (50.8 × 55.9 cm). Muscatine Art Center. CR 972
- White Bird of Paradise, 1939. Oil on canvas, 19 × 16 inches (48.3 × 40.6 cm). Georgia O'Keeffe Museum. CR 973
- Black Lava Bridge, Hana Coast, No. I,, 1939. Oil on canvas, 24 × 10 inches (61 × 25.4 cm). Honolulu Museum of Art. CR 976
- Black Lava Bridge, Hana Coast – No. 2,, 1939. Oil on canvas, 6 × 10 inches 15.2 × 25.4 cm). Honolulu Museum of Art. CR 977
- Waterfall – End of Road – Īao Valley, 1939. Oil on canvas, 19 × 16 inches (48.3 × 40.6 cm). Honolulu Museum of Art. CR 978
- Waterfall – No. 1 – ʻĪao Valley – Maui, 1939. Oil on canvas, 19 1/8 × 16 inches (48.6 × 40.6 cm). Memphis Brooks Museum of Art. CR 979
- Waterfall, No. 2, Iao Valley, 1939. Oil on canvas, 24 × 20 inches (61 × 50.8. cm). Private collection. CR 980
- Waterfall, No. III, 'Īao Valley, 1939. Oil on canvas, 24 1/4 × 20 inches (61.6 × 50.8 cm). Honolulu Museum of Art. CR 981
- Papaw Tree, Īao Valley, Maui, 1939. Oil on canvas, 19 × 16 inches (48.3 × 40.6 cm). Honolulu Museum of Art. CR 982
- Untitled (Yellow Flower), 1939. Oil on board, 10 1/4 x 8 inches (26 × 20.3 cm). Georgia O'Keeffe Museum. CR 984

Photographs

- Natural Stone Arch near Leho‘ula Beach, ‘Aleamai, 1939. Gelatin silver print. Georgia O'Keeffe Museum.
- Natural Stone Arch near Leho‘ula Beach, ‘Aleamai, 1939. Gelatin silver print. Georgia O'Keeffe Museum.
- Natural Stone Arch near Leho‘ula Beach, ‘Aleamai, 1939. Gelatin silver print. Georgia O'Keeffe Museum.
- Natural Stone Arch near Leho‘ula Beach, ‘Aleamai, 1939. Gelatin silver print. Georgia O'Keeffe Museum.
- Fence Morning Glory (Ipomoea ochracea), 1939. Gelatin silver print. Georgia O'Keeffe Museum.
- Canoe Shed at Wai'anapanapa Black Sand Beach, 1939. Gelatin silver print. Georgia O'Keeffe Museum.
- Cliffs and Coastline, 1939. Gelatin silver print. Georgia O'Keeffe Museum.
- Lava Arch, Wai'anapanapa State Park, 1939. Gelatin silver print. Georgia O'Keeffe Museum.
- Lava Arch, Wai'anapanapa State Park, 1939. Gelatin silver print. Georgia O'Keeffe Museum.
- Lava Arch, Wai'anapanapa State Park, 1939. Gelatin silver print. Georgia O'Keeffe Museum.
- Lava Arch, Wai'anapanapa State Park, 1939. Gelatin silver print. Georgia O'Keeffe Museum.
- Ocean Shore, 1939. Gelatin silver print. Georgia O'Keeffe Museum.
- Sugar Cane Fields and Clouds, 1939. Gelatin silver print. Georgia O'Keeffe Museum.
- Sugar Cane Fields and Clouds, 1939. Gelatin silver print. Georgia O'Keeffe Museum.
- Wai'anapanapa Black Sand Beach, 1939. Gelatin silver print. Georgia O'Keeffe Museum.
- Wai'anapanapa Black Sand Beach, 1939. Gelatin silver print. Georgia O'Keeffe Museum.
- Wai'anapanapa, Keawaiki Bay, 1939. Gelatin silver print. Georgia O'Keeffe Museum.

Three additional photographs in the Hawaii series were taken of O'Keeffe by Harold Stein:

- Georgia O'Keeffe in Hawaii, 1939. Gelatin silver print. Alfred Stieglitz/Georgia O’Keeffe Archive, Yale Collection of American Literature, Beinecke Rare Book and Manuscript Library
- Georgia O'Keeffe in Hawaii, 1939. Gelatin silver print. Alfred Stieglitz/Georgia O’Keeffe Archive, Yale Collection of American Literature, Beinecke Rare Book and Manuscript Library
- Georgia O'Keeffe in Hawaii, 1939. Gelatin silver print. Alfred Stieglitz/Georgia O’Keeffe Archive, Yale Collection of American Literature, Beinecke Rare Book and Manuscript Library

== Bibliography ==
- Blaszczyk, Regina Lee (2006). "The Colors of Modernism: Georgia O'Keeffe, Cheney Brothers, and the Relationship between Art and Industry in the 1920s". In Patricia Johnston (Ed.). Seeing High and Low: Representing Social Conflict in American Visual Culture. Berkeley: University of California Press. ISBN 0520241878. OCLC 61362718.
- Bogart, Michele H. (1995). Artists, Advertising, and the Borders of Art. University of Chicago Press. ISBN 0226063070. OCLC 31607925.
- Cass, Julia (August 14, 1989). "Charles T. Coiner, 91, Painter And Noted Advertising Designer". Philadelphia Inquirer. Archived from the original on May 21, 2015.
- Christopher, Tom (Summer 2018). "Georgia O'Keffe Paints Hawaii". Humanities. National Endowment for the Humanities. 39 (3).
- Cohen, Alina (May 22, 2018). "Georgia O'Keeffe's Missing Hawaiian Painting "Hibiscus" Resurfaces at Auction, Selling for $4.8 Million". Artsy. Retrieved June 6, 2024.
- Cowart, Jack; Hamilton, Juan; Greenough, Sarah (1987). Georgia O'Keeffe: Art and Letters. National Gallery of Art; New York Graphic Society Books, Washington, Boston. OCLC 1033646492.
- "Department of Paintings". The Museum Year: Annual Report of the Museum of Fine Arts, Boston. 112, 1987, p. 49. (subscription required)
- Gallati, Barbara Dayer (1989). Georgia O'Keeffe: Works from the Brooklyn Museum. Brooklyn: Brooklyn Museum. n.p.
- Drohojowska-Philp, Hunter (2005)[2004]. Full Bloom: The Art and Life of Georgia O'Keeffe. New York: W. W. Norton. ISBN 9780393343090. OCLC 1369657418.
- "Georgia O'Keeffe's Artistic Career". Data visualization. Georgia O'Keeffe Museum. March 11, 2024.
- Hamilton, William L. (May 24, 2018). "O'Keeffe’s Paradise, Lost and Found". The New York Times. p. C13. Retrieved January 27, 2024.
- Hawkins, Richard A. (2011). A Pacific Industry: The History of Pineapple Canning in Hawaii. London: I.B.Tauris. ISBN 9780755698400. OCLC 772844818.
- Hoffman, Katherine (1984). An Enduring Spirit: The Art of Georgia O'Keeffe. Metuchen, New Jersey: The Scarecrow Press, Inc. ISBN 9780810816725. OCLC 10185136.
- Jennings, Patricia; Ausherman, Maria (2011). Georgia O'Keeffe's Hawaiʻi. Kihei: Koa Books. ISBN 9780982165645. OCLC 726821685.
- Jewell, Edward Alden (May 1–14, 1942). "'Art Art' in Advertising". ARTnews. 41 (6): 30–31, 41. Retrieved May 12, 2024.
- Katz, Brigit (May 30, 2018). "See Georgia O’Keeffe’s Little-Known Hawaii Paintings Blossom Next to Real Plants". Smithsonian Magazine. Retrieved May 9, 2024.
- Kuh, Katharine (1962). The Artist's Voice: Talks with Seventeen Artists. New York: Harper & Row. OCLC 710851.
- Lisle, Laurie (1997)[1980]. Portrait of an Artist. New York: Washington Square Press. ISBN 9780671600402. OCLC 1082241056.
- McCausland, Elizabeth. (1940). "Exhibitions in New York". Parnassus. 12 (3): 42. (subscription required)
- Merrill, Christopher; Bradbury, Ellen (Ed.). (1998)[1992]. From the Faraway Nearby: Georgia O'Keeffe as Icon. Albuquerque: University of New Mexico Press. ISBN 0826318347. OCLC 1288384046.
- Messinger, Lisa Mintz (2001). Georgia O'Keeffe. London: Thames & Hudson. ISBN 0500203407. OCLC 1057621726.
- Murphy, Rita (2019). "Paradise For The Pioneer: Georgia O'Keeffe's Trip To Hawaiʻi". Art Journal. Providence College. 1 (4): 33–48.
- O'Connell, Maureen (August 10, 2013). "See Hawaii through the eyes of Georgia O'Keeffe and Ansel Adams". HAWAIʻI Magazine. Retrieved May 10, 2024.
- O'Keeffe, Georgia (1939). Georgia O'Keeffe: Exhibition of Oils and Pastels. January 22 – March 17, 1939. An American Place. Exhibition statement. Retrieved January 27, 2025.
- O'Keeffe, Georgia. (1940). Georgia O'Keeffe: Exhibition of Oils and Pastels. February 3 – March 17, 1940. An American Place. Exhibition statement. Retrieved June 5, 2024.
- Okihiro, Gary Y. (2009). Pineapple Culture: A History of the Tropical and Temperate Zones. Berkeley: University of California Press. ISBN 0520255135. OCLC 261173660.
- Papanikolas, Theresa (2013). Georgia O'Keeffe and Ansel Adams: The Hawaiʻi Pictures. Honolulu: Honolulu Museum of Art. ISBN 9780937426883. OCLC 835620238.
- Papanikolas, Theresa; Groarke, Joanna L. (2018). Georgia O'Keeffe: Visions of Hawaiʻi. The New York Botanical Garden and DelMonico Books-Prestel. ISBN 9783791357270. OCLC 1021055485.
- Perrottet, Tony (November 30, 2012). "O'Keeffe's Hawaii". The New York Times. Retrieved June 5, 2024.
- Peters, Sarah Whitaker (2006). In René Paul Barilleaux (Ed.). Georgia O'Keeffe: Color and Conservation. Jackson: Mississippi Museum of Art in association with Penn State University Press. ISBN 1887422110. OCLC 1414533846.
- Phillips (November 17, 2021). Georgia O'Keeffe. 20th Century & Contemporary Art Evening Sale New York Auction. Phillips. Retrieved May 8, 2024.
- "Pineapple for Papaya". Time. 35 (7): 42. February 12, 1940.
- Pollitzer, Anita (1988). A Woman on Paper: Georgia O'Keeffe. Simon & Schuster. p. 193. ISBN 9780671664312. OCLC 1151773659.
- Riley, Charles A. (1995). Color Codes: Modern Theories of Color in Philosophy, Painting and Architecture, Literature, Music and Psychology. Hanover, NH: University Press of New England. ISBN 9780874516715. OCLC 45733574.
- Robinson, Roxana (1999)[1989]. Georgia O'Keeffe: A Life. Hanover: University Press of New England. ISBN 9780874519068. OCLC 39732936.
- Rosen, Annie (May 2018). "Georgia O'Keeffe (1887–1986), Hibiscus". Christie's. Retrieved June 6, 2024.
- Saville, Jennifer (1990). Georgia O'Keeffe: Paintings of Hawaiʻi. Honolulu Academy of Arts. ISBN 0937426113. OCLC 23079609.
- Saville, Jennifer (2011). "Introduction". Revised. In Jennings, Patricia; Ausherman, Maria (Ed.). Georgia O'Keeffe's Hawaiʻi. Kiehi: Koa Books. ISBN 9780982165645. OCLC 726821685.
- Saville, Jennifer (2012). "Off in the Far Away: Georgia O'Keeffe's Letters Home from Hawaiʻi". Hawaiian Journal of History. 46: 83–137.
- Scott, Sascha T. (Summer 2020). "Georgia O'Keeffe's Hawaiʻi? Decolonizing the History of American Modernism". American Art. Smithsonian American Art Museum. 34 (2): 26–53. ISSN 1073-9300. doi:10.1086/710471.
- Tolpa, Eve (Fall 2011). "O'Keeffe's Little People". O'Keeffe: The Georgia O'Keeffe Museum Magazine. Retrieved June 3, 2024.
- Volpe, Lisa; Plotek, Ariel (2021a). Georgia O'Keeffe, Photographer. The Museum of Fine Arts, Houston; in association with Yale University Press. ISBN 9780300257809. OCLC 1245473527.
- Volpe, Lisa; Plotek, Ariel (November 5, 2021b). Georgia O'Keeffe, Photographer. Exhibition preview. Georgia O'Keeffe Museum. Retrieved June 4, 2024.
- Wright, Susan (1996). Georgia O'Keeffe: An Eternal Spirit. New York, NY: Todtri. ISBN 1880908743. OCLC 40639914.
