= Nutritionism =

Food related paradigm

Nutritionism is a paradigm that assumes that it is the scientifically identified nutrients in foods that determine the value of individual food stuffs in the diet. In other words, it is the idea that the nutritional value of a food is the sum of all its individual nutrients, vitamins, and other components. Another aspect of the term is the implication that the only point of eating is to promote bodily health. The term is largely pejorative, implying that this way of viewing food is simplistic and harmful, and the term is usually used to label others' views. The greatest popularizer of the term, journalist and professor of journalism Michael Pollan, argues that a food's nutritional value is "more than the sum of its parts."

Originally credited to Gyorgy Scrinis, the notion was popularized by Pollan. The key to Pollan's understanding of nutritionism is "the widely shared but unexamined assumption ... that the key to understanding food is indeed the nutrient." Since nutrients are invisible, it is now necessary to rely on nutrition experts to make food choices. Because science has an incomplete understanding of how food affects the human body, Pollan argues, relying solely on information regarding individual nutrients has led people and policy makers to repeatedly make poor decisions relating to nutrition.

== Flaws of the nutritionism paradigm ==
=== Problems highlighted by Pollan ===
Pollan blames nutritionism for many of the health problems relating to diet in the Western World today. He compares Nutritionism to a religion, relying on "priests" (nutrition scientists and journalists) to interpret the latest orthodoxy for the masses. Like many religions, nutritionism has divided the world into good and evil components, although what is considered good or evil can change dramatically over time.

Pollan believes that nutritionism is inherently flawed due to a reductive bias within science to isolate and study individual factors disconnected from their usual contexts such as diet and culture, factors which have repeatedly been shown to have a fundamental impact on nutritional outcomes. Even when scientists have attempted to study factors such as culture, diet, and long term consumption patterns, the enormous difficulties in making accurate measurements relating to individual nutritional components, and producing meaningful conclusions has resulted in incomplete results at best, and misleading or harmful results at worst.

Ben Goldacre wrote that nutritionism, or its attribution to scientists, is the "bollocks du jour", and that it is "driven by a set of first year undergraduate errors in interpreting scientific data." In his opinion, professional researchers and medical experts bear some blame for nutritionism because they at times created unrealistic expectations about the potential benefits of their research, but that the primary promoters of nutritionism are health food manufacturers, self-proclaimed "gurus" and journalists who have an incomplete understanding of science, along with a credulous public that is willing to believe whatever simplistic theories they are told in the mass media.

=== Focus on nutrients instead of on foods ===
Professor of the history of science Clifford D. Conner notes that the nutritionism paradigm helped U.S. agribusiness shift public attention away from major diet risks like sugar and red meat consumption to risks from nutrients invisible to the public, such as sucrose and saturated fat, respectively. A pathbreaking 1968 Congressional report of the McGovern Committee, entitled "Dietary Goals," called on Americans to reduce consumption of red meat and dairy. However, agribusiness corporate propaganda and industry lobbyists were largely successful in convincing the public and government regulators, respectively, to warn the public to reduce not consumption of sugar, red meat and dairy products, but instead to reduce "sucrose" and "saturated fat" intake. Thus, a federal government report in 1982 was tempered to advise the public to "Choose meats, poultry and fish that will reduce saturated-fat intake."

== Critique of Pollan ==
Journalist Daniel Engber has argued that Pollan's anti-nutritionism, or anti–food science stance, has taken on a dogmatic tint itself. Engber wrote: "Modern nutrition may be more of an ideology than a science, but so is Pollan's nutritional Darwinism. The two ideologies stand in direct opposition to one another, with the science-minded progressives on one side and the culinary conservatives on the other." One criticism is that while many scientific studies of nutrition, or the conclusions extrapolated from them by both scientists and journalists, have been bad, a scientific approach to food should not be rejected altogether. One reviewer notes that the study of vitamins and nutrients led to vast improvement in treatment of diseases such as beriberi or scurvy and that with further refinement food science may well help combat other diseases and health conditions. The complexity of food science should not be taken as a reason to abandon systematic investigation of it. Engber also argues that Pollan overidealizes the diet of our ancestors, and believes that it may not be well suited to our modern needs.

== See also ==
- List of diets
- Nutritionist
