= Hofmann's Potion: The Pioneers of LSD =

- Directed by: Connie Littlefield
- Written by: Connie Littlefield
- Produced by: Kent Martin, Sally Bochner
- Starring: Albert Hofmann, others
- Cinematography: Nigel Markham
- Edited by: Lawrence Jackman
- Production company: National Film Board of Canada (NFB)
- Distributed by: National Film Board of Canada (NFB)
- Release date: 2002
- Running time: 56 minutes
- Country: Canada
- Language: English

Hofmann's Potion: The Pioneers of LSD is a 2002 documentary about the early history of the psychedelic drug LSD. It was written and directed by Canadian filmmaker Connie Littlefield. The film stars Albert Hofmann, Aldous Huxley, Stanislav Grof, Al Hubbard, Abram Hoffer, Timothy Leary, Richard Alpert (Ram Dass), Ralph Metzner, Myron Stolaroff, and others.

== See also ==
- List of psychedelic documentaries
- The Substance: Albert Hofmann's LSD (2011)
- Better Living Through Chemistry (2021)
