= List of psychedelic documentaries =

This is a list of psychedelic documentaries, or documentary films and television episodes about psychedelic drugs, such as LSD, psilocybin, mescaline, dimethyltryptamine (DMT), 5-MeO-DMT, and ayahuasca. It also includes documentaries about MDMA.

== Films ==
- 5MEO: Are Some Doors Better Left Unopened? (2020)
- A New Understanding: Science of Psilocybin (2015)
- Acid Tests (1993)
- AWARE: Glimpses of Consciousness (2021)
- AYA: Awakenings (2013)
- Ayahuasca and the Path of the Shaman (2018)
- Ayahuasca: Vine of the Soul (2010)
- Becoming Nobody (2019)
- Better Living Through Chemistry (2021)
- Bufo Alvarius: The Underground Secret (2018)
- Dante: 500 Miles on Psychedelics (2026)
- Descending the Mountain (2021)
- Dirty Pictures (2010)
- DMT: The Spirit Molecule (2010)
- Dosed (2019)
- Dosed 2: The Trip of a Lifetime (2022)
- Dying to Know: Ram Dass & Timothy Leary (2014)
- Fantastic Fungi (2019)
- Feed Your Head (2010)
- From Shock to Awe (2018)
- Have a Good Trip: Adventures in Psychedelics (2020)
- Hofmann's Potion: The Pioneers of LSD (2002)
- How to Go Out of Your Mind: The LSD Crisis (1966)
- Ibogaine: Rite of Passage (2004)
- Icaros: A Vision (2016)
- In Waves and War (2024)
- Journeys (2026)
- Journeys to the Edge of Consciousness (2019)
- Magic Medicine (2018)
- Magic Trip: Ken Kesey's Search for a Kool Place (2011)
- Manifesting the Mind: Footprints of the Shaman (2009)
- María Sabina, Mujer Espíritu (1979)
- My Psychedelic Love Story (2020)
- Narrenschwämme – von Pilzen, Gordon Wasson und anderen Sonderlingen (Magic Mushrooms – From Mushrooms, Gordon Wasson and Other Eccentrics [The Mushroom Man]) (1996)
- Neurons to Nirvana: Understanding Psychedelic Medicines (2013)
- Orange Sunshine (2016)
- Peyote to LSD: A Psychedelic Odyssey (2008)
- Prophet of Ecstasy (2026)
- Psyched Out (2018)
- Psychedelia: The History and Science of Mystical Experience (2021)
- Psychedelic Revolution: The Secret History of the LSD Trade (2023)
- Psychonautics: A Comic’s Exploration of Psychedelics (2018)
- Shamans of the Amazon: A Timeless Journey (2001)
- Terence McKenna's True Hallucinations (2016)
- The Last Shaman (2016)
- The Medicine (2019)
- The Peyote Road: Ancient Religion in Contemporary Crisis (1994)
- The Psychedelic Drug Trial (2021)
- The Psychedelic Pioneers (2005)
- The Sacred Science (2011)
- The Substance: Albert Hofmann's LSD (2011)
- The Sunshine Makers (2015)
- The Way of the Psychonaut: Stanislav Grof's Journey of Consciousness (2020)
- Timothy Leary's Dead (1996)
- Timothy Leary's Last Trip (1997)
- Trip of Compassion (2019)
- Unraveling the Dream: Psychedelics, Awakening, and the Brain (2026)
- What a Trip: The Rick Doblin Story (2027)

== TV shows and episodes ==
- Everyman, Season 12, Episodes 10 and 11: The Beyond Within: The Rise of LSD and The Fall of LSD (1986)
- Hamilton's Pharmacopeia (many episodes) (2016–2021)
- How to Change Your Mind (all episodes) (2022)
- I Am Rebel, Season 1, Episode 3: The Love Drug (2016)
- The Business of Drugs, Season 1, Episode 2: Synthetics (2020)
- The Mind, Explained, Season 1, Episode 5: Psychedelics (2019)
- Trafficked with Mariana van Zeller, Season 3, Episode 2: LSD and Season 3, Episode 5: MDMA (2023)

== See also ==
- List of drug films
- List of films featuring hallucinogens
- List of films related to the hippie subculture
- List of psychedelic literature
- The Psychedelic Experience (1965 film)
