= Better Living Through Chemistry =

Better Living Through Chemistry may refer to:

- Better Living Through Chemistry (album), a 1996 album by Fatboy Slim
- Better Living Through Chemistry (2014 film), a 2014 American comedy-drama film starring Sam Rockwell and Olivia Wilde
- "Better Living Through Chemistry" (slogan), used by DuPont through much of the 20th century
- Better Living Through Chemistry (2021 film), a 2021 documentary about Alexander and Ann Shulgin
- "Better Living Through Chemistry", a song from the 2000 album Rated R by Queens of the Stone Age
- "Better Living Through Chemistry", a song from the 2005 album Planets by Adema
- "Better Living Through Chemistry", a Season 3 episode of Miami Vice
