= Dying to Know: Ram Dass & Timothy Leary =

- Film poster
- Directed by: Gay Dillingham
- Production company: CNS Communications
- Release date: 4 October 2014 (Mill Valley Film Festival)
- Running time: 95 minutes
- Language: English

Dying to Know: Ram Dass & Timothy Leary is a 2014 documentary film about Ram Dass and Timothy Leary, Harvard professors who advocated the study and use of psychedelic drugs.

== See also ==
- List of psychedelic documentaries
