= Berlin & Beyond Film Festival =

Film festival in San Francisco, California

Berlin & Beyond Film Festival is an annual film festival based in San Francisco, California featuring new cinema from Germany, Austria and Switzerland.

Founded in 1996, the festival is a program of San Francisco's branch of the Goethe-Institut and has become one of the largest and most significant German-speaking film festivals outside of Europe. Notable guests have included Mario Adorf, Doris Dörrie, Mara Eibl-Eibesfeldt, Hannelore Elsner, Anke Engelke, Florian David Fitz, Bruno Ganz, Tom Schilling, Aylin Tezel, Michael Verhoeven, and Wim Wenders. Annually, the festival welcomes over 10,000 people, and celebrates seasoned masters, up-and-coming new talents, dynamic new films, and momentous classics.

Through 2009, the festival took place each January at the Castro Theatre. In November 2009, it was announced that, starting in 2010, Berlin & Beyond would be moved to the fall to coincide with German Currents - a similar festival of the Goethe-Institut in Los Angeles. German Currents is a smaller festival, held at theaters in Los Angeles. The cooperation between the two festivals was prompted by the retirement of Ingrid Eggers, former festival director of Berlin & Beyond, who was instrumental in its founding. The cooperation was intended to allow the sister branches of the Goethe-Institut in Los Angeles and San Francisco to bring a larger and better selection of contemporary German-language films to the West Coast, and allow guest artists from Europe to make appearances at both festivals.

The festival’s current director is Sophoan Sorn, who was first appointed to lead the 15th edition, which took place in late October 2010 at the Castro Theater, along with an “Encore Day” in San Jose. The recent 22nd edition was held at the Castro Theatre from February 9 to 11, 2018; the Shattuck Cinemas in Berkeley on February 12, 2018; and the Goethe-Institut from February 13 to 15, 2018.

The 4th Berlin & Beyond Honolulu took place on April 8 to 9, 2017, in the Doris Duke Theatre at the Honolulu Museum of Art.

== Honors and Tributes ==
=== Lifetime or Career Achievement Award ===
Honoring a master of German cinema. Recent recipients include:

- Maria Schrader (Acting, Directing, and Screenwriting), 2017
- Mario Adorf (Acting), 2012
- Wim Wenders (Directing), 2009
- Ulrich Mühe (Acting, Posthumous), 2008
- Michael Verhoeven (Directing), 2006
- Bruno Ganz (Acting), 2005

=== Spotlight Award in Acting ===
- Lars Eidinger, 2018
- Frederick Lau, 2018
- Julia Jentsch, 2017
