= Jack Cowart =

American art historian

Jack Cowart (born 1945) is an executive director of the Roy Lichtenstein Foundation, who has held leadership positions at numerous American art museums including the Corcoran Gallery of Art and the National Gallery of Art in addition to being an expert on Henri Matisse and Roy Lichtenstein.

== Biography ==
He became interested in art history during the period of studying at the Virginia Military Institute, where he considered a career as a stained-glass craftsman.

In 1972, he received his Ph.D. in the history of art from Johns Hopkins University, where he got a full scholarship.

After he finished university, he started working for the Wadsworth Atheneum in Hartford, Conn. There he was a curator of a series of small shows, which were focused on new art and new ideas. Later he got a job at the St. Louis Art Museum, where he was in charge of a show of Matisse cutouts, "Expressions: New Art From Germany", the first survey of German neoexpressionist painting.

Then Cowart took over the position of head of the department of 20th-century art at the National Gallery of Art (1983-1992), where he helped Herb and Dorothy Vogel find a home for their collection, supervised the transfer humorously portrayed in the film Herb and Dorothy, and laid the groundwork for their donation of 50 works each to 50 states. His main exhibitions for the National Gallery were "Henri Matisse: The Early Years in Nice, 1916-1930" in 1987 and many others, which were focusing on Georgia O'Keeffe, Rauschenberg and Ellsworth Kelly: The Years in France.

Cowart was then deputy director-chief curator and executive director at the Corcoran Gallery of Art.

After seven years at the Corcoran, Cowart became the head of the Lichtenstein Foundation.

Throughout his career, Jack Cowart has launched exhibits such as Henri Matisse Paper Cut-Outs in 1977 and Roy Lichtenstein 1979-1980 that opened in St. Louis in 1981 and then traveled to the [Whitney Museum] in New York under the title “Lichtenstein Insights/Oversight.” He has published widely on Henri Matisse, Roy Lichtenstein, and other American and European 20th-century modern and contemporary artists.

In 2001, the French Ministry of Culture and Communication awarded him a Chevalair de l’Ordre des Arts et des Lettres.

== Personal life ==
He is married and with wife Susan, who is a systems engineer, lived in France from 1969 to 1971 working on his thesis.

== Books ==
- Matisse in Morocco: The Paintings and Drawings, 1912-1913
- Henri Matisse: the Early Years in Nice, 1916-1930
- Georgia O'Keeffe: Art and Letters
- Roy Lichtenstein, 1970-1980
- Roy Lichtenstein (German edition)
- Lichtenstein in Process
- Expressions: A New Art from Germany: Georg Baselitz, Jörg Immendorfl, Ardem Kiegler, Markius Liperlz, A.R. Peneck
- Thomas Rozkovski: Twenty-Four Paintings
- Address, Battle of Monmuth
- Henley Southeastern Spectrum: Seventh Annual Jurored Exhibitions
- ROCI: Rauschenberg Overseas Culture Interchange
- Proof Positive: Forty Years of Contemporary American Printmaking
