= Better Living Through Chemistry (slogan) =

Variant of a 1935 DuPont advertising slogan

The phrase "Better Living Through Chemistry" (BLTC) is a variant of a DuPont advertising slogan, "Better Things for Better Living...Through Chemistry". DuPont adopted it in 1935 and it was their slogan until 1982 when the "Through Chemistry" part was dropped. Since 1999, their slogan has been "The miracles of science".

The phrase "Better Living Through Chemistry" was used on products that were not affiliated with DuPont to circumvent trademark infringement. This transmutation is now more commonly used than the original. This statement is used for commentary on several different topics, from the promotion of prescription or recreational drugs, to the praise of chemicals and plastics, to the sarcastic criticism of the same.

DuPont used the "Better Living Through Chemistry" slogan not to promote particular products, but to change viewers' opinions about the role of business in society. In the words of DuPont's advertising director, Charles Hackett, the advertisements sought to address "unspoken fears of bigness in business", which were based on "an emotional rather than a rational foundation".

The phrase has since been used in popular culture as the name of a film and of music albums, sometimes as a euphemistic reference to recreational drug use.
