= I Feel Love (book) =

2023 book by Rachel Nuwer

I Feel Love: MDMA and the Quest for Connection in a Fractured World
- Author: Rachel Nuwer
- Language: English
- Subject: MDMA
- Publisher: Bloomsbury Publishing
- Publication date: 2023
- Pages: 384
- ISBN: 9781635579581
- OCLC: 1380759118
- Website: https://www.rachelnuwer.com/i-feel-love https://www.bloomsbury.com/us/i-feel-love-9781635579581/

I Feel Love: MDMA and the Quest for Connection in a Fractured World is a 2023 nonfiction book by American author Rachel Nuwer about the entactogen drug MDMA ("ecstasy"). The book "examines groundbreaking new research that demonstrates that MDMA ... may allow those suffering from PTSD, addiction and anxiety to reconnect to a social world from which their ailments have separated them". The book touches on the illegal MDMA manufacturing business of Carina Leveriza-Franz.

Kirkus Reviews called it "an illuminating, myth-free exploration of mental health from a unique perspective". Publishers Weekly said it was "a nuanced, well-researched" book that "will enrich the cultural, legal, and medical conversation around drugs."

== See also ==
- List of psychedelic literature
