= Rachel Nuwer =

American journalist and author

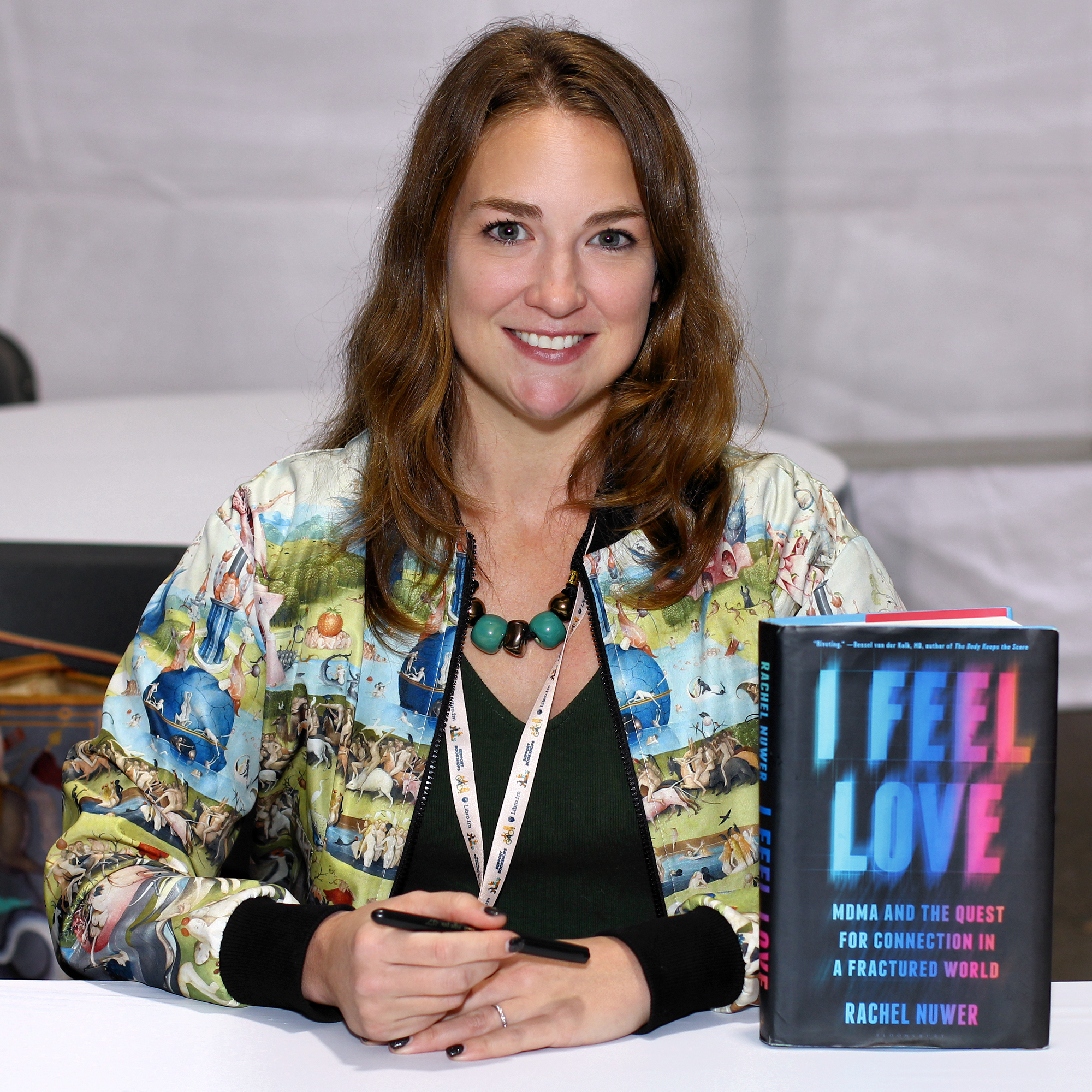
- Nuwer at the 2023 Texas Book Festival
- Occupation: Journalist
- Notable work: Poached: Inside the Dark World of Wildlife Trafficking (2018); I Feel Love: MDMA and the Quest for Connection in a Fractured World (2023)

Rachel Nuwer is an independent American journalist and author of the 2018 nonfiction book Poached: Inside the Dark World of Wildlife Trafficking (Da Capo Press). She has covered the issue of poaching from the perspectives of criminals, activists and science for years in prominent publications, including the Smithsonian, BBC Future, The New York Times, and National Geographic.

== Early life ==
Nuwer grew up in Mississippi and studied biology at Loyola University New Orleans, where she researched Mekong River fish. She earned a master's degree in ecology at the University of East Anglia and attended New York University's Science, Health and Environmental Reporting Program. Her master's thesis for her East Anglia degree was published by the Cambridge University Press.

Nuwer says that her education in biology helped shape her career.

== Career ==
Nuwer has written for Smithsonian, BBC Future, The New York Times, and National Geographic. She is well known for working under cover to access black markets for wildlife. Nuwer's 2023 book, I Feel Love: MDMA and the Quest for Connection in a Fractured World, examines the historical, cultural and scientific aspects of MDMA, commonly known as Ecstasy or Molly. A review of the book in The Washington Post said that Nuwer's "sober assessment of MDMA's promise and limitations, written in incisive but generous prose, steers away from the quackery and sentimentality that pervade the field of psychedelic research."

== Awards and honors ==
Nuwer won the Abe Fellowship for Journalists in 2017.

Her book Poached won the American Society of Journalists and Authors general non-fiction book award, a Nautilus Book Award, and the Santa Monica Public Library Green Prize for Sustainable Literature.

== Bibliography ==
- Poached: inside the dark world of wildlife trafficking. Da Capo Press. 2018.
- "Egg hitchhikers: fish eggs still hatched after passing through a duck". Scientific American. 323 (3): 16–17. September 2020.
- I Feel Love: MDMA and the Quest for Connection in a Fractured World. Bloomsbury Publishing. June 2023. ISBN 978-1635579574.
