= Interdisciplinary Conference on Psychedelic Research =

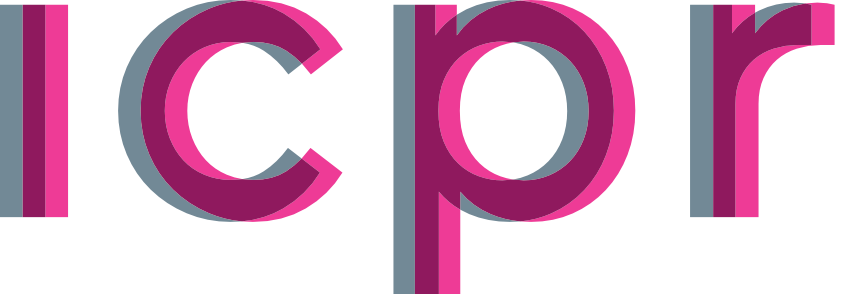
Logo of ICPR

The Interdisciplinary Conference on Psychedelic Research (ICPR) is a scientific conference held in the Netherlands that focuses on research into psychedelics and their therapeutic, neuroscientific, and social dimensions. The event is organized by the OPEN Foundation, a Dutch non-profit dedicated to advancing psychedelic science and responsible integration of psychedelics into healthcare and society.

== History ==
=== Origins (2010) ===
The origins of ICPR trace back to “Mind Altering Science,” a two-day conference organized on October 23-24, 2010, by the OPEN Foundation at the University of Amsterdam. The event focused on early clinical trials investigating the therapeutic use of MDMA and LSD. This event laid the groundwork for the establishment of the recurring ICPR series.

=== EARS 2011 ===
On June 17, 2011, OPEN co-organized the European Ayahuasca Research Symposium (EARS) with Dr. Bia Labate and Dr. Brian Anderson. Held at the University of Amsterdam, the symposium gathered over 300 attendees from across Europe to discuss ayahuasca and DMT research in fields such as anthropology, neuroscience, and psychology. The symposium helped establish collaborative research frameworks for ayahuasca studies.

== Editions ==
=== ICPR 2012 ===
The first conference under the ICPR name took place on October 6–7, 2012, at the Mozes en Aäronkerk (Aaron & Moses Church) in Amsterdam. The event was inaugurated by Professor Wouter Hanegraaf and attended by around 400 participants. Speakers included Robin Carhart-Harris, Ben Sessa, Matt Johnson, Torsten Passie, Jordi Riba, and Ilsa Jerome.

=== ICPR 2016 ===
ICPR 2016 was held on June 3-5, 2016 in Amsterdam, and is the third international scientific conference on research into psychedelics organised by the OPEN Foundation. The event expanded to a three-day format and featured over 60 speakers, including Roland Griffiths, Amanda Feilding, Rick Doblin, Robin Carhart-Harris, Alicia Danforth, Bill Richards, and Marcela Ot’alora.

=== ICPR 2020 (Online) ===
The ICPR 2020 edition was held virtually from September 24–27, 2020, due to the COVID-19 pandemic. Featured speakers included Michael Mithoefer, Janis Phelps, Wade Davis, and Katrin Preller. Discussions addressed topics such as diversity, equity, and access in psychedelic medicine, as well as the broader medicalization and mainstreaming of psychedelics.

=== ICPR 2022 ===
The fifth edition of the conference was held from September 21–23, 2022, marking a return to in-person gatherings after the pandemic. Hosted at the Philharmonie Haarlem, the event featured over 80 speakers and around 1,000 attendees. Notable participants included Paul Stamets, Rick Doblin, Amanda Feilding, Roland Griffiths, David Nichols, Bernardo Kastrup and Erika Dyck. The conference covered themes such as psychedelic ethics, neuroscience, clinical applications, and the intersection between research, therapy, and business.

=== ICPR 2024 ===
The sixth edition, held from June 6–8, 2024, took place once again at the Philharmonie Haarlem. It was inaugurated by Pia Dijkstra, the Dutch Minister of Healthcare, marking the first time a government official opened the event. In her opening speech, the Minister announced a 3.4 million grant for clinical psychedelic research in the Netherlands. A diverse group of participants, including researchers, clinicians, entrepreneurs, and policymakers attended. Other notable speakers included Bob Jesse, Erik Davis, Ethan Nadelman, Gül Dölen, Rosalind Watts, and Thomas Metzinger. Panels addressed topics such as ethical guidelines, safety standards, and access to psychedelic-assisted therapy in Europe. The event received international coverage, including from Forbes.

=== ICPR 2026 ===
The seventh edition of ICPR is scheduled to take place from 4–6 June 2026 in the Netherlands, at the Philharmonie Haarlem, Haarlem.

=== Wet Blanket Award ===
The Wet Blanket Award is presented at ICPR to researchers whose work provides constructive critical perspectives on psychedelic research. Established by David Yaden of Johns Hopkins University, the award recognizes presentations that draw attention to limitations, risks, or alternative interpretations within the field.

In 2024, Jamila Hokanson and colleagues at the Yale Department of Psychiatry received the award for a case series examining individuals with obsessive-compulsive disorder (OCD) who did not respond to psilocybin-assisted therapy.

=== Recordings ===
Recordings of many ICPR talks and panels are publicly available on the conference’s official YouTube channel, the OPEN Foundation ICPR channel.

== Focus and themes ==
ICPR is characterized by its interdisciplinary approach, fostering dialogue among diverse academic and professional fields. Topics typically include psychiatry, psychopharmacology, neurobiology, clinical psychology, cultural anthropology, and philosophy. Recent editions have increasingly emphasized ethical frameworks for psychedelic-assisted therapy, diversity and inclusion in research and clinical practice, and the social and community integration of psychedelic experiences.

== Organization ==
ICPR is organized by the OPEN Foundation, founded in 2007 and headquartered in the Netherlands. The foundation’s executive director, Joost J. Breeksema, is a philosopher and psychiatric researcher at the University Medical Center Groningen (UMCG).

== Side programming and events ==
ICPR includes various forms of side programming alongside its main scientific sessions, these typically involve workshops, summits, and experiential installations organised by the OPEN Foundation and partner organisations. ICPR has also hosted the Pathways to Access Summit, a one-day event focused on policy and regulatory issues related to psychedelic treatments.

== See also ==
- List of psychedelic conferences
