= OPEN Foundation =

- Formation: 2007; 19 years ago
- Location: Amsterdam, the Netherlands
- Fields: Psychedelic research

The OPEN Foundation is a Dutch non-profit organisation founded in 2007 and headquartered in Amsterdam, the Netherlands. It is dedicated to advancing psychedelic research and promoting the responsible and ethical integration of psychedelics into healthcare and society. The foundation also organises the Interdisciplinary Conference on Psychedelic Research (ICPR), Europe's scientific conference focused on psychedelic research.

== Mission ==
The OPEN Foundation's stated mission is to advance psychedelic research and therapies in the Netherlands and Europe by bringing together and educating professionals, policymakers, and the public through conferences, training and educational programmes, and membership programmes, and by conducting and promoting rigorous interdisciplinary research into psychedelics.

== History ==
The OPEN Foundation was established in 2007 in the Netherlands. From its inception, the foundation positioned itself as an interdisciplinary platform, convening researchers, clinicians, policymakers, and members of the public around the science of psychedelic substances.

An early milestone came in October 2010, when the foundation organised "Mind Altering Science," a two-day conference at the University of Amsterdam focused on early clinical trials investigating the therapeutic use of MDMA and LSD. This event laid the groundwork for the establishment of the recurring ICPR conference series.

In June 2011, OPEN Foundation co-organised the European Ayahuasca Research Symposium (EARS) at the University of Amsterdam alongside Dr. Bia Labate and Dr. Brian Anderson. The symposium drew over 300 attendees from across Europe to discuss ayahuasca and DMT research spanning anthropology, neuroscience, and psychology.

The first conference under the ICPR name was held in October 2012 at the Mozes en Aäronkerk in Amsterdam, inaugurated by Professor Wouter Hanegraaff and attended by approximately 400 participants.

Over subsequent years, the organisation expanded its activities beyond conferences to encompass professional training, community membership programmes, research partnerships, and public engagement. By 2024, the foundation had grown to a team spanning events management, education, communications, and research coordination.

== Activities ==
=== Interdisciplinary Conference on Psychedelic Research (ICPR) ===
The OPEN Foundation is the organiser of the Interdisciplinary Conference on Psychedelic Research (ICPR). The conference is held once every two years in the Netherlands and brings together researchers, clinicians, therapists, policymakers, entrepreneurs, and members of the public.

ICPR has grown significantly in scale since its inaugural 2012 edition. The 2022 edition attracted around 1,000 attendees at the Philharmonie Haarlem, while the 2024 edition drew over 1,500 attendees from 55 countries, featuring more than 100 speakers across 50 sessions. The 2024 edition was opened by Pia Dijkstra, the Dutch Minister of Healthcare, who announced €3.4 million in new public funding for psychedelic research in the Netherlands. The 2026 edition drew more than 1,100 attendees and featured over 150 presenters across more than 85 sessions.

=== Community membership programmes ===
The OPEN Foundation operates a community membership programme. The general community membership offers regular events, curated resources, and networking opportunities to individuals interested in psychedelic science and care. In the autumn of 2024, the foundation launched a separate professional membership programme designed for clinicians, researchers, and practitioners seeking more specialised content and peer exchange. By the end of 2024, the general programme had 253 active members and the professional programme had grown to 36 members, representing a 66% overall membership growth during the year.

=== Education programmes ===
==== ADEPT ====
In 2024, the OPEN Foundation developed ADEPT (Advanced Education in Psychedelic Therapy), a two-year training programme for psychedelic therapists launched in May 2025. The programme combines theory, practice, ethics, and experiential learning, and is designed to address an anticipated shortage of qualified psychedelic therapists in Europe while establishing new educational standards in the field.

==== Foundations of Psychedelic Therapy ====
The foundation also offers a shorter course titled "Foundations of Psychedelic Therapy," providing introductory training for mental health professionals interested in psychedelic-assisted therapy.

=== Research collaborations ===
The OPEN Foundation participates in collaborative research projects. In 2024, it played a leading role in the EU-funded PsyPal project, Europe's first publicly funded clinical trial investigating psilocybin therapy to treat existential distress in palliative care. OPEN led work packages focused on peer support network development and the dissemination of clinical trial findings.

=== Pathways to Access Summit ===
Alongside ICPR 2024, the foundation launched the Pathways to Access Summit, a one-day event convening over 300 stakeholders, including researchers, policymakers, clinicians, and industry leaders, to address regulatory hurdles, reimbursement pathways, and the integration of psychedelic therapies into European healthcare systems.

=== Other educational events ===
In addition to its multi-year training programmes, the OPEN Foundation organises shorter workshops and professional development sessions on specific topics relevant to psychedelic-assisted therapy. These include workshops on Ketamine-Assisted Psychotherapy (KAP) and professional supervision groups for practitioners working with psychedelic-assisted therapy in clinical contexts.

== Impact and recognition ==
=== Media coverage ===
ICPR 2024 received international media coverage, including from Forbes, as well as coverage from international psychedelic research organisations including ICEERS and Chacruna.

=== Academic field influence ===
The OPEN Foundation's conferences have featured many of the most prominent researchers in the field of psychedelic science, including Robin Carhart-Harris, Roland Griffiths, David Nichols, Rick Doblin, Amanda Feilding, and Paul Stamets, among others. The ICPR's interdisciplinary scope including psychiatry, psychopharmacology, neurobiology, clinical psychology, cultural anthropology, and philosophy, has contributed to cross-disciplinary dialogue within the field.

=== PsyPal project ===
In 2024, the OPEN Foundation joined the PsyPal consortium, funded through the European Union's Horizon Europe research programme. PsyPal is the first EU-funded clinical trial dedicated to exploring the potential of psychedelic-assisted therapy, specifically investigating psilocybin-assisted therapy for existential and psychological distress in patients with life-limiting conditions, including Chronic Obstructive Pulmonary Disease (COPD), Multiple Sclerosis (MS), Amyotrophic Lateral Sclerosis (ALS), and Atypical Parkinsonian Disorders (APD).

The project brings together a pan-European consortium of 19 partner organisations from nine countries, including academic medical centres, research institutes, palliative care specialists, and patient advocacy organisations. Within the consortium, the OPEN Foundation co-leads the development of peer support networks for patients, the communication and dissemination strategy for clinical trial findings, and the organisation of professional workshops dedicated to the intersection of palliative care and psychedelic-assisted therapy. In June 2024, OPEN hosted the first in-person General Assembly of the PsyPal project in Haarlem, bringing together representatives from all 19 partner organisations to align priorities and advance clinical trial implementation.

== Governance ==
The foundation is governed by an independent board whose members are themselves active participants in multidisciplinary psychedelic research. As of 2024, board members include Prof. em. Wim van den Brink (Chair), Ass. Prof. Michiel van Elk (Treasurer), Prof. Dr. Patricia Pisters (Secretary), and Renske Blom (Member). The executive leadership team is headed by Dr. Joost Breeksema (Executive Director), a philosopher and psychiatric researcher at the University Medical Center Groningen (UMCG).
