= Darryl S. Inaba =

President of CNS Productions, Inc.

Darryl Seiichi Inaba
- Born: Denver, Colorado, U.S.
- Education: UCSF Medical Center; University of California, San Francisco
- Known for: Author Uppers, Downers, All Arounders; Haight Ashbury Free Clinics
- Scientific career
- Fields: Addiction Medicine; Clinical Toxicology; Detoxification

Darryl S. Inaba (born June 16, 1946) is an American pharmacist who is the remaining owner and President of CNS Productions, Inc. in Medford, OR. He is an associate professor of Pharmacology at the UCSF Medical Center in San Francisco, California, and the Director of Clinical and Behavioral Health Services at ARC (Addiction Recovery Center) in Medford, Oregon. He is also special consultant and instructor for the University of Utah School of Alcoholism and Other Drug Dependencies, as well as the Director of Education and Research at CNS Productions. Dr. Inaba is also on the editorial board of the Journal of Psychoactive Drugs, which has been published since 1967.

== Career ==
Inaba was one of the original volunteers at the Haight Ashbury Free Clinics in San Francisco which was founded by David E. Smith in response to the medical needs of the thousands of young people who descended upon San Francisco for the Summer of Love. The Free Clinic opened on June 6, 1967.

In 1969, Inaba co-founded the Detoxification and Rehabilitation Unit of the Haight Ashbury Clinic with Skip Gay in response to the epidemic of methamphetamine and heroin addiction. As director of detox, Inaba supervised the treatment of some 350,000 addicts and alcoholics who were self-referred.

Inaba was the CEO and president of the Haight Ashbury Free Clinics from 1989 to 2005, as well as the past chairman of the San Francisco Asian American Substance Abuse Task Force. He is also the first lifelong Fellow of the Haight Ashbury Free Clinics. While at the Free Clinic (1967-2005) Inaba had a great interest in the development culturally consistent substance abuse treatment services.

=== Haight Ashbury Free Clinic Benefit Concerts ===
The Clinic was initially funded through proceeds of benefit concerts, many of which were organized by Bill Graham. The first of such benefit concerts took place on July 13, 1967, at the Fillmore Auditorium in San Francisco, California. Another, titled "Dr. Sunday's Medicine Show", took place on October 8, 1967, in San Jose, California.

These benefit concerts, organized with promoter Bill Graham (promoter) in the early years of the Clinic, included bands such as Big Brother and the Holding Company, Creedence Clearwater Revival, Ravi Shankar, George Harrison, The Charlatans, Blue Cheer, and Quicksilver Messenger Service. The concerts proved crucial in providing the funding necessary to keep the Clinic doors open during its early years, as traditional sources of funding were not immediately forthcoming.

=== Rock Medicine ===
Through the benefit concerts organized with Bill Graham in the late 1960s and early 1970s, Inaba and George "Skip" Gay created The Rock Medicine Services in the spring of 1973. Bill Graham staged two consecutive Saturday concerts at Kezar Stadium in San Francisco, California, featuring The Grateful Dead and Led Zeppelin. Bill Graham asked the clinic to staff a "medical emergency care tent" during both concerts. These small stadium concerts, about 18,000 at the Dead and 25,000 at Led Zeppelin, evolved into Bill Graham's Days on the Green concert series. The "medical emergency care tent" became Rock Medicine, a branch of the Haight Ashbury Free Clinics that still exists today and provides medical care at various Bay Area music concerts and events.

=== Writing ===
Uppers, Downers, All Arounders (ISBN 978-0-926544-39-0), originally published by CNS Productions in 1989 and now in its 8th edition and co-authored by William Cohen, is Inaba's way of explaining the physiological and pharmacological responses that the body has to psychoactive drugs. Psychoactive drugs are those chemicals that can pass through the blood brain barrier and produce a mental effect in the central nervous system. Thus uppers stimulate, downers depress, and psychedelic drugs have a variety of effects on the neurotransmitters.

=== More recent work ===
In the 1980s, Inaba set up the Asian American Recovery Services and, with the Reverend Cecil Williams, he helped set up the Facts on Crack program for Glide African American Extended Family Services.

After leaving the Haight Ashbury Free Clinics, Inaba became the Clinical Director of Genesis Recovery Center in Central Point, Oregon, from 2005 till 2008. He is now, 2009-present, the Director of Clinical and Behavioral Health Services at the Addiction Recovery Center in Medford, Oregon.

Inaba is currently the Director of Education and Research at CNS Productions, Inc., and has been the scientific advisor and writer of over 50 educational videos produced by CNS Productions.

== Filmography ==
Inaba was a co-writer and educational consultant on the following films:

- "Psychoactive" - 1976
- "Uppers, Downers, All Arounders" - 1984
- Haight Asbbury Cocaine Film - 1985
- "A Matter of Balance" - 1986
- Haight Ashbury Crack Film - 1987
- "From Opium to Heroin" - 1988
- Haight Ashbury Training Series, volumes 1-5 - 1992-94
- "Marijuana: the Mirror that Magnifies" -1995
- "Methamphetamine: The Rush to Crash" - 1996
- "In and Out of Control: Emotional, Physical & Sexual Violence" - 1997
- "Roots of Addiction" - 1998
- "Heroin: From Pleasure to Pain" - 1999
- "Alcohol and Its Effects" - 2000
- "Sports and Drugs" - 2001
- "Psychoactive: Club Drugs & Inhalants" - 2002
- "Cocaine & Crack: A Craving for More" - 2003
- "Prescription & OTC Abuse" - 2004
- "Co-Occurring Disorders: Mental Health & Drugs" - 2005
- "Medical Consequences of Addiction" - 2005
- "Marijuana: Neurochemistry & Physiology" - 2006
- "Methamphetamine: Neurochemistry and Recovery" - 2007
- "Neurochemistry of Relapse and Recovery" - 2008
- 10-part series: "Use, Abuse and Addiction" - 2009
- "Drug and Behavioral Addictions: Roots of Addiction" - 2009
- "The Neurochemistry of the Roots of Addiction" - 2011
- "Reflections in a Rearview Mirror: How I Got My DUI, Costs & Losses, Physiology, Levels of Use, and How My Life Changed for the Better" (5 parts) - 2013
- "Beyond Opiates" - 2013

== Publishing history ==
- Uppers, Downers, All Arounders (CNS Productions, 1989; ISBN 978-0-926544-39-0)

== See also ==
- List of University of California, San Francisco faculty
- List of chief executive officers
