= William Cohen (disambiguation) =

William Cohen (born 1940) is an American author and politician who served as Secretary of Defense (1997–2001) under Bill Clinton.

William Cohen may also refer to:

- William W. Cohen (1874–1940), U.S. Representative from New York
- William Edgar Cohen (1941–2014), filmmaker
- William D. Cohen, associate justice of the Vermont Supreme Court
- William N. Cohen (1857–1938), American judge

== See also ==
- William D. Cohan (born 1960), newspaper reporter
- Bill Coen, basketball coach
- Billy Coen, fictional Resident Evil character
