= Berkeley Free Clinic =

Free clinic in California, United States

Coordinates: 37°52′2.88″N 122°15′45.54″W

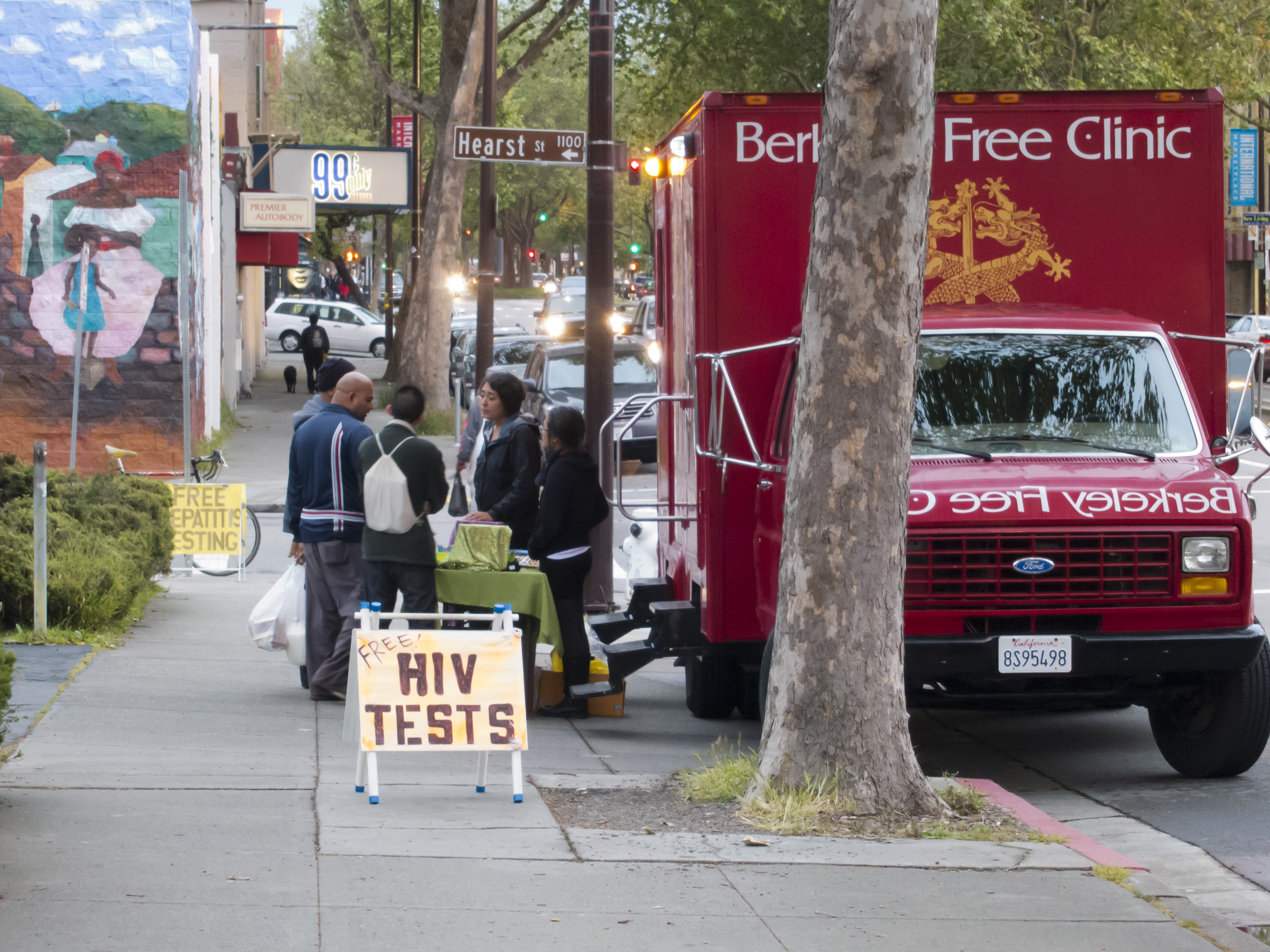
Berkeley Free Clinic truck offering free HIV tests

The Berkeley Free Clinic is a non-profit community clinic located in Berkeley, California, US. It is operated as a worker-run collective by more than 100 volunteers. It has provided free medical care since opening in 1969.

== History ==
The Berkeley Free Clinic was founded in 1969 during the People's Park riots in Berkeley. Two founders were local booksellers Moe Moskowitz and Fred Cody, of Moe's Books and Cody's Books. Since opening, the Berkeley Free Clinic has provided both medical and dental assistance. In 2009, the clinic faced severe budget cuts due to the fiscal crisis in the state of California.

In February 2017, the Berkeley Free Clinic created a program that offers free dental work to undocumented immigrants.

== See also ==
- Haight Ashbury Free Clinic
- UC San Diego Student-Run Free Clinic Project
