= William Edgar Cohen =

American film director

- Born: November 2, 1941; Washington, D.C., U.S.
- Died: May 20, 2014 (aged 72); Medford, Oregon
- Known for: Documentary Writer/Producer "Old Age: Do Not Go Gentle" "Here's Looking at You Kid"; President, CNS Productions, Inc.
- Scientific career
- Fields: Publishing; Documentary Film

William Edgar Cohen (November 2, 1941 – May 20, 2014) was the president of CNS Productions, Inc. and co-author of Uppers, Downers, All Arounders, a textbook on the neurochemistry and neuropharmacology of psychoactive drugs. Additionally, he wrote and directed over two hundred teaching films and documentaries. Cohen was born in Washington, D.C., and raised in New York City.

== Medical documentaries ==
Prior to becoming a filmmaker, William Cohen studied architecture at the Massachusetts Institute of Technology but left to begin a career in television news and filmmaking, first at KPTV in Portland, Oregon from 1961 to 1963. After a four-year stint in the U.S. Air Force, stationed in Japan and Hawaii, Cohen resumed his television news career in San Francisco at KTVU, KRON (NBC), and KGO (ABC) as an editor and documentary producer.

In 1970 Cohen began to produce, direct, and edit medical films for corporate clients and hospitals including the UCSF Medical Center, 3M, and Brooks Shoes. In 1975, at the urging of Darryl Inaba, PharmD, Director of the Haight Ashbury Detoxification, Rehabilitation, and Aftercare Project, he co-produced and directed his first drug-education film, "Psychoactive" with Paul Steinbroner.

Cohen wrote and directed documentaries for ABC, NBC and PBS. He has received one National Emmy, a Peabody Award, and the Robert F. Kennedy Journalism Award in recognition of the documentaries "Old Age: Do Not Go Gentle".

== CNS Productions ==
Cohen co-founded CNS Productions, Inc. with Paul Steinbroner in 1983 to devote himself to producing content specific to the addiction field. Along with the authorship of Darryl Inaba, PharmD, the company produced their first film which they distributed nationally. Since then CNS Productions, Inc. has produced over fifty titles on the subject of addiction.

== Uppers, Downers, All Arounders ==
In 1989 CNS Productions published William Cohen's and Darryl Inaba's textbook Uppers, Downers, All Arounders (ISBN 978-0-926544-30-7), now in its 8th edition. The book was based on the many interviews with clients from the expanding film catalog, the onset of the crack epidemic, and the multicultural needs of patients.

Uppers, Downers, All Arounders was Dr. Inaba's and William Cohen's way of explaining the physiological and pharmacological responses that the body has to psychoactive drugs, those chemicals that can pass through the blood brain barrier and produce a mental effect in the central nervous system. Thus, uppers stimulate, downers depress, and psychedelic drugs have a variety of effects on the neurotransmitters.

== Filmography ==
William Cohen was the co-writer, editor and (where indicated with an asterisk) director of the following films:

- "Psychoactive"* – 1976
- "Uppers, Downers, All Arounders"* – 1984
- Haight Asbbury Cocaine Film*, 1985
- "A Matter of Balance"* – 1986
- Haight Ashbury Crack Film* – 1987
- "From Opium to Heroin"* – 1988
- Haight Ashbury Training Series volumes 1–5* – 1992–1994
- "Marijuana: the Mirror that Magnifies" – 1995
- "Methamphetamine: The Rush to Crash" – 1996
- "In and Out of Control: Emotional, Physical & Sexual Violence" – 1997
- "Compulsive Gambling & Recovery"* – 1997
- "Roots of Addiction"* – 1998
- "Heroin: From Pleasure to Pain" – 1999
- "Alcohol and Its Effects"* – 2000
- "Sports and Drugs" – 2001
- "Compulsive Gambling: Signs & Symptoms"* – 2001
- "The Other Gamblers: Seniors & Women"* – 2001
- "Psychoactive: Club Drugs & Inhalants" – 2002
- "Cocaine & Crack: A Craving for More" – 2003
- "Prescription & OTC Abuse" – 2004
- "Co-Occurring Disorders: Mental Health & Drugs"* – 2005
- "Medical Consequences of Addiction" – 2005
- "Marijuana: Neurochemistry & Physiology" – 2006
- "Methamphetamine: Neurochemistry and Recovery" – 2007
- "Neurochemistry of Relapse and Recovery" – 2008
- 10-part series: Use, Abuse and Addiction (2009)
- "Drug and Behavioral Addictions: Roots of Addiction"
- "The Neurochemistry of the Roots of Addiction" – 2011
- "Reflections in a Rearview Mirror: How I Got My DUI, Costs & Losses, Physiology, Levels of Use, and How My Life Changed for the Better" (5 parts) – 2013
- "Beyond Opiates" – 2013
