= Paul Steinbroner =

American film director

- Born: March 18, 1949 (age 77); Los Angeles, California, United States
- Education: San Francisco State University; American Film Institute
- Known for: Publisher, CNS Productions, Inc.

Paul J. Steinbroner was born March 18, 1949, in Los Angeles. In 1983, he founded CNS Productions, a publishing and distribution company specializing in topics related to addiction, neuropharmacology, and brain chemistry. He is the publisher of Uppers, Downers, All Arounders, a textbook on the neurochemistry and neuropharmacology of psychoactive drugs. Having previously produced informational and scientific documentaries, Steinbroner formed TouchPoint Productions to create a series of documentaries on transformational healing. Collectively known as Called From Darkness, the five part series examines willingness and spiritual awakening from five different cultural perspectives. In 2023, Paul was awarded the Michael Ford Journalism Award from the National Association of Addiction Treatment Providers for his contribution of over 50 films and publications related to addiction and treatment.

== CNS Productions ==
After multiple assignments as a freelance script writer and a television-news editor, Paul moved to Los Angeles to attend the Production Program at the American Film Institute. After this stint in Hollywood, Paul formed CNS Productions as a vehicle to produce and distribute films that addressed the unmet needs of people with substance-abuse disorders. Based on the experiences of Darryl Inaba, Pharm.D, while Director of Treatment at the Haight Ashbury Detoxification, Rehabilitation, and Aftercare Clinic, CNS Productions' films found a national audience.

== Filmography ==
Paul Steinbroner was the producer and (where indicated with an asterisk) director of the following films:

- "Psychoactive" – 1976
- "Uppers, Downers, All Arounders" – 1984
- Haight Asbbury Cocaine Film, 1985
- "A Matter of Balance" – 1986
- Haight Ashbury Crack Film – 1987
- "From Opium to Heroin" – 1988
- Haight Ashbury Training Series volumes 1-5 – 1992-94
- "Marijuana: the Mirror that Magnifies"* – 1995
- "Methamphetamine: The Rush to Crash"* – 1996
- "In and Out of Control: Emotional, Physical & Sexual Violence"* – 1997
- "Compulsive Gambling & Recovery" – 1997
- "Roots of Addiction" – 1998
- "Heroin: From Pleasure to Pain"* – 1999
- "Alcohol and Its Effects" – 2000
- "Sports and Drugs" – 2001
- "Compulsive Gambling: Signs & Symptoms"* – 2001
- "The Other Gamblers: Seniors & Women"* – 2001
- "Psychoactive: Club Drugs & Inhalants"* – 2002
- "Cocaine & Crack: A Craving for More"* – 2003
- "Prescription & OTC Abuse"* – 2004
- "Co-Occurring Disorders: Mental Health & Drugs" – 2005
- "Medical Consequences of Addiction"* – 2005
- "Marijuana: Neurochemistry & Physiology"* – 2006
- "Methamphetamine: Neurochemistry and Recovery"* – 2007
- "Neurochemistry of Relapse and Recovery"* – 2008
- 10-part series: "Use, Abuse and Addiction"* – 2009
- "Drug and Behavioral Addictions: Roots of Addiction"
- "The Neurochemistry of the Roots of Addiction"* – 2011
- "Reflections in a Rearview Mirror: How I Got My DUI, Costs & Losses, Physiology, Levels of Use, and How My Life Changed for the Better" (5 parts) – 2013
- "Beyond Opiates" – 2013
- "Cannabinyzed: The Mental and Physical Effects of Marijuana" – 2016
- "Soul Sanctuary" – 2019
- "Stand Down" – 2019
- "Home Boy Joy Ride" – 2020
- "Journeys on the Red Road" – 2020
- "JustUs" – 2021
- "Welcome to Recovery Cafe" – 2023
