= CNS Productions =

American educational material publisher

CNS Productions, Inc.
- Type: Private
- Industry: Textbooks, educational DVDs
- Founded: 1976
- Founder: Paul Steinbroner, William E. Cohen, Darryl Inaba, PharmD
- Headquarters: Medford, Oregon, U.S.
- Area served: Worldwide
- Key people: Darryl S. Inaba (owner since 2018) (publisher & president) (research director)
- Divisions: Textbook, Educational Video
- Website: CNSproductions.com

CNS Productions is a publisher of educational materials — primarily textbooks and instructional DVDs — dealing with psychoactive drugs and addiction. It was formed in 1983 by Paul Steinbroner, with long-time collaborator William E. Cohen who had an extensive background in medical film production. CNS Productions has produced and distributed over fifty separate titles on issues related to the neurobehavioral effects of psychoactive drugs.

Darryl Inaba, PharmD, 2018 Sole Owner, president, current CNS CEO, former CEO and President of San Francisco's Haight Ashbury Free Clinic served as a consultant on all of the films CNS produced, and co-authored Uppers, Downers, All Arounders (ISBN 978-0-926544-30-7) which was originally published in 1989 to support the film of the same name. Inaba formally joined CNS in 2006.

"CNS" is a reference to the central nervous system.

== Publications ==
Uppers, Downers, All Arounders: Physical and Mental Effects of Psychoactive Drugs by William E. Cohen, and Darryl Inaba, PharmD

Uppers, Downers, All Arounders, a college-level textbook, addresses psychoactive drugs and compulsive behaviors, relying on the most current data and studies as well as practical information and interviews drawn from treatment professionals and their clients. The material provides insights into the complex fields of drug abuse, compulsive behaviors, addiction, treatment, recovery, and prevention. It has been adopted by over 400 colleges and universities.

Beyond Opiates: The Evolving Science of Pain and Addiction by Paul J. Steinbroner and Darryl S. Inaba, 2015

== Films ==
- "Uppers, Downers, All Arounders," 1984
- Haight Asbury Cocaine Film, 1985
- "A Matter of Balance," 1986
- Haight Ashbury Crack Film, 1987
- "From Opium to Heroin"- 1988
- Haight Ashbury Training Series volumes 1-5, 1992–94
- "Marijuana: the Mirror that Magnifies," 1995
- "Methamphetamine: The Rush to Crash," 1996
- "In and Out of Control: Emotional, Physical & Sexual Violence," 1997
- "Compulsive Gambling & Recovery," 1997
- "Roots of Addiction," 1998
- "Heroin: From Pleasure to Pain," 1999
- "Alcohol and Its Effects," 2000
- "Sports and Drugs," 2001
- "Compulsive Gambling: Signs & Symptoms," 2001
- "The Other Gamblers: Seniors & Women," 2001
- "Psychoactive: Club Drugs & Inhalants," 2002
- "Cocaine & Crack: A Craving for More," 2003
- "Prescription & OTC Abuse," 2004
- "Co-Occurring Disorders: Mental Health & Drugs," 2005
- "Medical Consequences of Addiction," 2005
- "Marijuana: Neurochemistry & Physiology," 2006
- "Methamphetamine: Neurochemistry and Recovery," 2007
- "Neurochemistry of Relapse and Recovery," 2008
- 10-part series: Use, Abuse and Addiction (2009)
- "Drug and Behavioral Addictions: Roots of Addiction"
- "The Neurochemistry of the Roots of Addiction," 2011
- "Reflections in a Rearview Mirror: How I Got My DUI, Costs & Losses, Physiology, Levels of Use, and How My Life Changed for the Better" (5 parts) - 2013
