= Psychedelic Science =

- Abbreviation: PS
- Discipline: Psychedelic medicine

Publication details
- Publisher: Multidisciplinary Association for Psychedelic Studies (MAPS)
- History: 2017 (1st) to present
- Frequency: Biannual
- Website: https://www.psychedelicscience.org/

Psychedelic Science (PS) is a biannual scientific conference on psychedelic drugs hosted by the Multidisciplinary Association for Psychedelic Studies (MAPS). The first conference was in 2017 and the fifth was in 2025. Psychedelic Science is the largest conference on psychedelic drugs in the world. More than 12,000 people attended the fourth conference in 2023. In 2023 and 2025, the conference was hosted in Denver, Colorado, where some psychedelics have been decriminalized.

== List of events ==
- Psychedelic Science 2017 (PS2017) [1st], April 19–24, 2017, Oakland, California
- Psychedelic Science 2023 (PS2023) [4th], June 19–23, 2023, Denver, Colorado
- Psychedelic Science 2025 (PS2025) [5th], June 16–20, Denver, Colorado

== See also ==
- List of psychedelic conferences
