= List of psychedelic journals =

This is a list of psychedelic journals, or academic journals about psychedelic drugs. They include:

- Eleusis (Journal of Psychoactive Plants & Compounds) (1995–2003) [ISSN 1125-7865]
- Journal of Psychedelic Studies (Akadémiai Kiadó/AKJournals)
- Journal of Psychoactive Drugs (formerly Journal of Psychedelic Drugs) (Taylor & Francis)
- Psychedelic Medicine (Sage Journals/Mary Ann Liebert)
- Psychedelic Monographs and Essays (PM & E Publishing Group) (1985–1994)
- Psychedelic Review (1963–1971) [ISSN 0033-2631]
- Psychedelics (Elsevier/ScienceDirect)
- Psychedelics: The Journal of Psychedelic and Psychoactive Drug Research (Genomic Press)
- The Entheogen Review (The Journal of Unauthorized Research on Visionary Plants and Drugs) (1992–2008) [ISSN 1066-1913]

== See also ==
- Lists of academic journals
- List of psychedelic literature
- List of psychedelic conferences
- List of psychedelic news and media organizations
