= Psychedelic Medicine =

Psychedelic medical journal

- Discipline: Psychedelic drugs, medicine
- Language: English
- Edited by: Peter Hendricks, Charles D. Nichols

Publication details
- History: 2023–present
- Publisher: Mary Ann Liebert on behalf of the International Society for Research on Psychedelics
- Frequency: Quarterly
- Open access: Hybrid

Standard abbreviations
- ISO 4: Psychedelic Med.

Indexing
- ISSN: 2831-4425 (print); 2831-4433 (web)
- LCCN: 2022200469
- OCLC no.: 1304260166

Links
- Journal homepage; Online archive

Psychedelic Medicine is a quarterly peer-reviewed medical journal on the use of serotonergic psychedelics as therapeutic agents in medicine. Its editors-in-chief are Peter Hendricks (University of Alabama at Birmingham) and Charles D. Nichols (Louisiana State University). The journal was established in 2023 and is published by Mary Ann Liebert. It is the first medical journal to be focused exclusively on psychedelics.

== See also ==
- List of psychedelic journals
- List of psychedelic literature
- Journal of Psychoactive Drugs (formerly Journal of Psychedelic Drugs)
