= Charles D. Nichols =

American pharmacologist

- Education: Purdue University; Carnegie Mellon University
- Employer(s): Louisiana State University Health Sciences Center New Orleans; Vanderbilt University School of Medicine
- Website: https://www.medschool.lsuhsc.edu/pharmacology/nicholsbio2023.aspx https://www.medschool.lsuhsc.edu/pharmacology/lab_nichols.aspx https://www.heffter.org/charles-d-nichols-phd/

Charles D. Nichols is an American pharmacologist who studies psychedelic drugs and inflammation. He also studied fruit flies for many years, including giving them psychedelics. Nichols is the son of famous psychedelic chemist David E. Nichols. Charles Nichols is a professor and researcher at Louisiana State University School of Medicine and the lead scientist of the psychedelic medicine pharmaceutical company Eleusis Therapeutics (since acquired by Beckley Psytech). He is also the co-editor-in-chief of the academic journal Psychedelic Medicine, which started in 2022.

Nichols discovered that psychedelics such as DOI show powerful anti-inflammatory effects and that this effect is mediated by functionally selective activation of serotonin 5-HT_{2A} receptors. Moreover, he found that the anti-inflammatory effects of psychedelics are dissociable from their hallucinogenic effects. The anti-inflammatory effects of psychedelics are of interest in the potential treatment of inflammatory diseases, such as asthma and neuroinflammation. Nichols has studied psychedelic microdosing in humans towards potential anti-inflammatory benefits.

Nichols received his bachelor's degree in biology and biochemistry from Purdue University in 1989, his Doctor of Philosophy at Carnegie Mellon University in 1997, and completed his postdoc in pharmacology at Vanderbilt University in 2002, before moving to Louisiana State University.

== Selected publications ==
- Nichols CD, Sanders-Bush E (May 2002). "A single dose of lysergic acid diethylamide influences gene expression patterns within the mammalian brain". Neuropsychopharmacology. 26 (5): 634–642. doi:10.1016/S0893-133X(01)00405-5. PMID 11927188.
- Nichols CD, Ronesi J, Pratt W, Sanders-Bush E (2002). "Hallucinogens and Drosophila: linking serotonin receptor activation to behavior". Neuroscience. 115 (3): 979–84. doi:10.1016/s0306-4522(02)00354-8. PMID 12435434.
- Nichols DE, Nichols CD (May 2008). "Serotonin receptors". Chem Rev. 108 (5): 1614–1641. doi:10.1021/cr078224o. PMID 18476671.
- Yu B, Becnel J, Zerfaoui M, Rohatgi R, Boulares AH, Nichols CD (November 2008). "Serotonin 5-hydroxytryptamine(2A) receptor activation suppresses tumor necrosis factor-alpha-induced inflammation with extraordinary potency". J Pharmacol Exp Ther. 327 (2): 316–323. doi:10.1124/jpet.108.143461. PMID 18708586.
- Pandey UB, Nichols CD (June 2011). "Human disease models in Drosophila melanogaster and the role of the fly in therapeutic drug discovery". Pharmacol Rev. 63 (2): 411–436. doi:10.1124/pr.110.003293. PMC 3082451. PMID 21415126.
- Nichols CD, Becnel J, Pandey UB (March 2012). "Methods to assay Drosophila behavior". J Vis Exp (61). doi:10.3791/3795. PMC 3671839. PMID 22433384.
- Nau F, Yu B, Martin D, Nichols CD (2013). "Serotonin 5-HT2A receptor activation blocks TNF-α mediated inflammation in vivo". PLOS ONE. 8 (10) e75426. Bibcode:2013PLoSO...875426N. doi:10.1371/journal.pone.0075426. PMC 3788795. PMID 24098382.
- Nau F, Miller J, Saravia J, Ahlert T, Yu B, Happel KI, Cormier SA, Nichols CD (January 2015). "Serotonin 5-HT₂ receptor activation prevents allergic asthma in a mouse model". Am J Physiol Lung Cell Mol Physiol. 308 (2): L191–8. doi:10.1152/ajplung.00138.2013. PMC 4338939. PMID 25416380.
- Nichols DE, Johnson MW, Nichols CD (February 2017). "Psychedelics as Medicines: An Emerging New Paradigm". Clin Pharmacol Ther. 101 (2): 209–219. doi:10.1002/cpt.557. PMID 28019026.
- Kyzar EJ, Nichols CD, Gainetdinov RR, Nichols DE, Kalueff AV (November 2017). "Psychedelic Drugs in Biomedicine". Trends Pharmacol Sci. 38 (11): 992–1005. doi:10.1016/j.tips.2017.08.003. PMID 28947075.
- Flanagan, Thomas W.; Nichols, Charles D. (4 July 2018). "Psychedelics as anti-inflammatory agents". International Review of Psychiatry. 30 (4): 363–375. doi:10.1080/09540261.2018.1481827. ISSN 0954-0261. PMID 30102081.
- Kuypers KP, Ng L, Erritzoe D, Knudsen GM, Nichols CD, Nichols DE, Pani L, Soula A, Nutt D (September 2019). "Microdosing psychedelics: More questions than answers? An overview and suggestions for future research". J Psychopharmacol. 33 (9): 1039–1057. doi:10.1177/0269881119857204. PMC 6732823. PMID 31303095.
- Flanagan TW, Sebastian MN, Battaglia DM, Foster TP, Cormier SA, Nichols CD (November 2019). "5-HT2 receptor activation alleviates airway inflammation and structural remodeling in a chronic mouse asthma model". Life Sci. 236 116790. doi:10.1016/j.lfs.2019.116790. PMID 31626791.
- Family N, Maillet EL, Williams LT, Krediet E, Carhart-Harris RL, Williams TM, Nichols CD, Goble DJ, Raz S (March 2020). "Safety, tolerability, pharmacokinetics, and pharmacodynamics of low dose lysergic acid diethylamide (LSD) in healthy older volunteers". Psychopharmacology (Berl). 237 (3): 841–853. doi:10.1007/s00213-019-05417-7. PMC 7036065. PMID 31853557.
- Flanagan TW, Nichols CD (2022). "Psychedelics and Anti-inflammatory Activity in Animal Models". Disruptive Psychopharmacology. Current Topics in Behavioral Neurosciences. Vol. 56. pp. 229–245. doi:10.1007/7854_2022_367. ISBN 978-3-031-12183-8. PMID 35546383.
- Nichols CD (November 2022). "Psychedelics as potent anti-inflammatory therapeutics". Neuropharmacology. 219 109232. doi:10.1016/j.neuropharm.2022.109232. PMID 36007854.
- Wulff AB, Nichols CD, Thompson SM (June 2023). "Preclinical perspectives on the mechanisms underlying the therapeutic actions of psilocybin in psychiatric disorders". Neuropharmacology. 231 109504. doi:10.1016/j.neuropharm.2023.109504. PMID 36921889.
- Dourron HM, Nichols CD, Simonsson O, Bradley M, Carhart-Harris R, Hendricks PS (December 2023). "5-MeO-DMT: An atypical psychedelic with unique pharmacology, phenomenology & risk?". Psychopharmacology (Berl). 242 (7): 1457–1479. doi:10.1007/s00213-023-06517-1. PMID 38072874.

== See also ==
- List of psychedelic chemists
- 2C-iBu
