= HealthRIGHT 360 =

Nonprofit healthcare provider in California

- Formation: 2011; 14 years ago
- Type: Nonprofit
- Headquarters: 1563 Mission St; San Francisco, California, United States
- Website: https://www.healthright360.org/

HealthRIGHT 360 is a nonprofit organization offering various healthcare services in the San Francisco Bay Area and California. It is San Francisco’s largest publicly funded addiction treatment provider, provides health services at concerts, and provides mental, medical, and dental care. It serves over 40,000 people each year. It was founded during the 1960s counterculture movement as the Haight Ashbury Free Clinic, which merged with the Walden House in 2011. The organization offers services regardless of an individual's ability to pay.

Like many drug rehabilitation programs, it has received criticism regarding the quality of its services.
