= List of psychedelic news and media organizations =

This is a list of psychedelic news and media organizations, or news and media organizations and websites covering psychedelic drugs. They include:

- DoubleBlind Magazine
- Lucid News
- Psychedelic Alpha (Pα)
- Psychedelic Chronicle
- Psychedelic Finance
- Psychedelic Invest
- Psychedelic Observer
- Psychedelic Science Review (PSR)
- Psychedelic Spotlight (PS)
- Psychedelic State(s) of America (PSA)
- Psychedelic Times
- Psychedelics.co.uk
- Psychedelics Today
- Psymposia
- Reality Sandwich
- Sociedelic
- The Microdose
- The Psilocybin Record
- The Spore Report
- Think Wilder
- ThirdWave
- Tripsitter

== See also ==
- List of psychedelic literature
- List of psychedelic journals
- List of psychedelic conferences
- List of psychedelic pharmaceutical companies
- Hamilton's Pharmacopeia
- Psychedelic church
- Erowid
