= David E. Smith (physician) =

American physician

David E. Smith M.D., M.S.
- A photo of Smith in 2007
- Born: February 7, 1939 (age 87)
- Other names: David E. Smith; Dr. Dave
- Education: Bakersfield College; University of California, Berkeley; University of California, San Francisco
- Occupations: Physician and academic
- Years active: 1962–present
- Organization(s): Haight Ashbury Free Clinic; San Francisco General Hospital; University of California, San Francisco
- Known for: Founding the Haight Ashbury Free Clinic and Journal of Psychedelic Drugs, work in addiction medicine
- Spouse: Millicent Buxton-Smith
- Website: drdave.org

David Elvin Smith, also known as Dr. Dave, is a physician and academic who is best known for founding and directing the Haight Ashbury Free Clinic (also known as the "Hippie Clinic"). He is also known for founding and editing the Journal of Psychedelic Drugs (later renamed the Journal of Psychoactive Drugs). In addition, Smith served as president of the American Society of Addiction Medicine and is considered one of the fathers and founders of modern addiction medicine.

== Education, internships and marriage ==
Smith graduated from Bakersfield College in 1958, received an undergraduate degree from the University of California, Berkeley in 1960, and obtained his Doctor of Medicine (M.D.) degree as well as a Master of Science (M.S.) in pharmacology from the University of California, San Francisco in 1964. He interned at San Francisco General Hospital from 1964 to 1965 and completed a post-doctoral fellowship residency at the University of California, San Francisco from 1965 to 1967. Smith began studying psychoactive drugs while in graduate school in the early 1960s. He founded the Journal of Psychedelic Drugs in 1967. Smith married his wife Millicent Buxton-Smith, whom he met at the Haight-Ashbury Free Clinic, in 1977. He continued as an adjunct professor at the University of California, San Francisco by the mid-2000s. Smith has written numerous books and had published more than 350 journal articles by 2013.

== Work at Haight Ashbury ==
The inside of the Haight Ashbury Free Clinic shortly after opening during the Summer of Love in 1967.

The Haight Ashbury Free Clinic, also known as the "Hippie Clinic", was founded in the Haight-Ashbury district of San Francisco during the Summer of Love in 1967 and was one of the first free clinics opened in the United States. It treated hippies, addicts, and homeless people and served as a safe and sympathetic space for hippies at a time when other clinics and hospitals refused or shunned them. A major goal of the clinic was "judgement-free treatment". The clinic featured psychedelic art to make it more welcoming to hippies and had a comforting room with a lava lamp and talk-down guides for people having bad trips in order to help optimize set and setting. The city's medical establishment staunchly opposed the opening of a clinic for hippies, which is said to have not wanted to take care of them and wanted them "to go away". The Haight Ashbury Free Clinic's slogan and motto was "Health care is a right, not a privilege", which has since become a famous mainstream phrase. Due to his work with the clinic, Smith has been referred to as the "father of the free clinic movement". There are now more than 2,000 free clinics in the United States. Smith, the Haight Ashbury Free Clinic, and San Francisco in general have also been described as having helped pioneer Medicare for All.

Smith himself was a member of the counterculture and took LSD and other drugs in the 1960s. According to Smith, LSD gave him a spiritual experience and caused him to undergo a "consciousness transformation" that made him feel one with the world and compelled him to help others and the poor, which led to him founding the Haight Ashbury Free Clinic. He has also said that he had a "vision that denial of health care to one segment of the population is a denial to all" while on LSD. Smith has said that the preceding was "not at all the way I was prior to that". However, Smith's views on drugs such as cannabis and psychedelics have shifted considerably since the 1960s, with this happening slowly at first, and he now has greater concern about their risks. Later sober, Smith has disclosed struggling himself with addiction and dependence to alcohol and cannabis in the past and says that he last took LSD in the mid-1960s. He has described initially being shunned by the general medical community for his efforts with the Haight Ashbury Free Clinic. In addition, addiction medicine, which emerged in the 1960s and was at the time a new and radical practice, was shunned and even illegal then, with Smith "committing multiple felonies a day" by treating addicts without turning them in to the police. Smith described a condition he called "psychedelic syndrome", a partially culture-bound syndrome related to chronic psychedelic use, in 1969.

The Haight Ashbury Free Clinic struggled to stay open and was often searched by police. It is known to have treated counterculture figures such as Janis Joplin. Many counterculture rock stars and figures helped fund the clinic, among the most famous including Jerry Garcia of the Grateful Dead, Janis Joplin, Jimi Hendrix, and George Harrison of The Beatles. The clinic also once treated Charles Manson and his followers a couple of years before the Manson murders. The clinic continued as a refuge and compassionate space caring for people using harder drugs like methamphetamine and traumatized Vietnam veterans in the 1970s and for people with HIV/AIDS in the 1980s. The government eventually decided that the clinic was beneficial and began issuing them federal grants in the early 1970s.

== Resignation and further work ==
Smith resigned from the Haight Ashbury Free Clinic due to a managerial dispute citing philosophical differences in 2006 and it closed in 2019 due to financial difficulties. He continues to work in addiction medicine and remains involved in the free clinic movement through his Smith Family Foundation. In 2022, Smith described having recently had his first psychedelic experience, with psilocybin-containing mushrooms, since his previous experiences with LSD in the mid-1960s, and expressed hope that medical psychedelics could also provide therapeutic benefits for others.

== Selected publications ==
=== Books ===
- Smith, David Elvin (1970). The New Social Drug: Cultural, Medical and Legal Perspectives on Marijuana. Prentice-Hall. ISBN 978-0-13-615757-1.
- Smith, David E.; Bentel, David J.; Schwartz, Jerome L. (1971). The Free Clinic: A Community Approach to Health Care and Drug Abuse. Beloit, Wisconsin: Stash Press.
- Smith, David Elvin; Luce, John (1971). Love Needs Care: A History of San Francisco's Haight-Ashbury Free Medical Clinic and Its Pioneer Role in Treating Drug-abuse Problems. Little, Brown. ISBN 978-0-316-80143-0.
- Smith, David Elvin; Gay, George R. (1972). "It's So Good, Don't Even Try it Once": Heroin in Perspective. Prentice-Hall. ISBN 978-0-13-506584-6.
- Smith, David E.; Wesson, Donald R.; Eiswirth, Nancy A. (1981). Cocaine in America. Center City, MN: Hazelden Educational Materials. ISBN 978-0-89486-139-0.
- Smith, David Elvin; Wesson, Donald R. (1973). Uppers and Downers. Prentice Hall. ISBN 978-0-13-938605-3.
- Seymour, Richard B.; Smith, David E. (1987). Drugfree: A Unique, Positive Approach to Staying Off Alcohol and Other Drugs. New York: Facts on File Publications. ISBN 978-0-8160-1363-0.
- Seymour, Richard B. (1987). The Haight Ashbury Free Medical Clinics: Still Free After All These Years, 1967-1987. Partisan Pres.
- Seymour, Richard; Seymour, Richard B.; Smith, David Elvin (1987). Guide to Psychoactive Drugs: An Up-to-the-minute Reference to Mind-altering Substances. Harrington Park Press. ISBN 978-0-918393-43-2.
- Smith, David Elvin (2001). Clinician's Guide to Substance Abuse. McGraw-Hill, Medical Pub. Division. ISBN 978-0-07-118257-7.
- Amen, Daniel G.; Smith, David Elvin (16 June 2010). Unchain Your Brain: 10 Steps to Breaking the Addictions that Steal Your Life. MindWorks Press. ISBN 978-1-886554-38-2.
- Smith, David Elvin; Saunders, Barbara (2023). Healthcare is a Right: A Memoir. Haight Ashbury Publications. ISBN 979-8--34227814-0.

=== Journal articles ===
- Smith, David E. (1967). "Lysergic Acid Diethylamide: An Historical Perspective". Journal of Psychedelic Drugs. 1 (1): 1–5. doi:10.1080/02791072.1967.10524336. ISSN 0022-393X.
- Smith D, Rose AJ (June 1968). "Observations in the Haight-Ashbury Medical Clinic of San Francisco. Health problems in a "hippie" subculture". Clin Pediatr (Phila). 7 (6): 313–316. doi:10.1177/000992286800700604. PMID 5694638.
- Smith DE, Rose AJ (June 1968). "The use and abuse of LSD in Haight-Ashbury (observations by the Haight-Ashbury Medical Clinic)". Clin Pediatr (Phila). 7 (6): 317–322. doi:10.1177/000992286800700605. PMID 5648337.
- Smith, David E. (1969). "LSD and the Psychedelic Syndrome". Clinical Toxicology. 2 (1): 69–73. doi:10.3109/15563656908990915. ISSN 0009-9309.
- Smith DE, Seymour RB (1997). "Addiction medicine and the free clinic movement". J Psychoactive Drugs. 29 (2): 155–160. doi:10.1080/02791072.1997.10400183. PMID 9250942.
- Smith DE, Heilig S, Seymour RB (1998). "Marijuana at the millennium: medical and social implications". J Psychoactive Drugs. 30 (2): 123–125. doi:10.1080/02791072.1998.10399681. PMID 9692373.
- Smith DE, Lee DR, Davidson LD (June 2010). "Health care equality and parity for treatment of addictive disease". J Psychoactive Drugs. 42 (2): 121–126. doi:10.1080/02791072.2010.10400684. PMID 20648907.
- Smith DE (June 2010). "The evolution of addiction medicine and its San Francisco roots". J Psychoactive Drugs. 42 (2): 199–201. doi:10.1080/02791072.2010.10400692. PMID 20648915.
- Smith DE (December 2011). "The evolution of addiction medicine as a medical specialty". Virtual Mentor. 13 (12): 900–905. doi:10.1001/virtualmentor.2011.13.12.mhst1-1112. PMID 23137430.
- Smith DE, Raswyck GE, Davidson LD (2014). "From Hofmann to the Haight Ashbury, and into the future: the past and potential of lysergic acid diethlyamide". J Psychoactive Drugs. 46 (1): 3–10. doi:10.1080/02791072.2014.873684. PMID 24830180.
- Smith DE (2016). "Marijuana: A Fifty-Year Personal Addiction Medicine Perspective". J Psychoactive Drugs. 48 (1): 3–10. doi:10.1080/02791072.2015.1116720. PMID 26757396.
- Smith DE (2017). "Medicalizing the Opioid Epidemic in the U.S. in the Era of Health Care Reform". J Psychoactive Drugs. 49 (2): 95–101. doi:10.1080/02791072.2017.1295334. PMID 28296623.
- Smith DE (2019). "The Role of the Journal of Psychedelic Drugs in the Evolution of Psychedelic Medicine". J Psychoactive Drugs. 51 (2): 98–101. doi:10.1080/02791072.2019.1589607. PMID 30890033.
- Smith DE (March 2022). "The potential of psychedelic medicine - A personal account". J Neurol Sci. 434: 120128. doi:10.1016/j.jns.2021.120128. PMID 34998238.
