= Psychedelic Review =

- Cover of Psychedelic Review, Vol. 1, No. 1.
- Discipline: Psychedelic drugs
- Language: English
- Edited by: Paul A. Lee, Ralph Metzner, Rolf von Eckartsberg, Gunther Weil, Timothy Leary, others

Publication details
- History: 1963–1971 (8 years)
- Publisher: International Federation for Internal Freedom (IFIF); Psychedelic Review (United States)
- Frequency: Irregular
- ISO 4: Find out here

Indexing
- ISSN: 0033-2631
- OCLC no.: 2266570

Links
- Journal homepage

The Psychedelic Review, or simply Psychedelic Review, was an academic journal about psychedelic drugs which was published from 1963 to 1971 and spanned 11 issues in total. It was founded by Timothy Leary, Ralph Metzner, and Gunther Weil, was edited by Paul A. Lee, Ralph Metzner, Rolf von Eckartsberg, Gunther Weil, Timothy Leary, and others, and was published in Cambridge, Massachusetts. The journal has been said by Jonathan Ott to have helped popularize the term "psychedelic" as the name for serotonergic hallucinogens.

== See also ==
- List of psychedelic journals
- List of psychedelic literature
- Journal of Psychoactive Drugs (formerly Journal of Psychedelic Drugs)
