= List of psychedelic conferences =

This is a list of psychedelic conferences, or scientific conferences on psychedelics and related drugs.

- Psychedelic Science (PS) – Multidisciplinary Association for Psychedelic Studies (MAPS)
- Interdisciplinary Conference on Psychedelic Research (ICPR) – OPEN Foundation
- SXSW – Psychedelics Track – South by Southwest

== See also ==
- List of psychedelic news and media organizations
- List of psychedelic journals
- List of psychedelic pharmaceutical companies
