= Journal of Psychoactive Drugs =

Peer-reviewed medical journal on psychoactive drugs

- Cover of Journal of Psychoactive Drugs, Vol. 12, No. 1 (first issue after rename).
- Discipline: Pharmacology
- Language: English

Publication details
- Former name: Journal of Psychedelic Drugs
- History: 1967–present
- Publisher: Taylor & Francis
- Impact factor: 2.80 (2022)

Standard abbreviations
- ISO 4: J. Psychoact. Drugs

Indexing
- ISSN: 0279-1072 (print); 2159-9777 (web)

Links
- Journal homepage

The Journal of Psychoactive Drugs is a peer-reviewed medical journal on psychoactive drugs. It was established in 1967 by David E. Smith and is currently published five times per year by Taylor & Francis. It was previously titled Journal of Psychedelic Drugs until 1980. It was the first journal established in the United States to focus on psychoactive drug use, and continues to introduce groundbreaking work in topics such as drug use and criminality, therapeutic communities, dual diagnosis, psychotherapy/counseling, methadone maintenance treatment, and culturally-relevant substance abuse treatment. According to the Journal Citation Reports, the journal has a 2016 impact factor of 1.740.

== See also ==
- List of psychedelic journals
- List of psychedelic literature
- Psychedelic Review
- Psychedelic Medicine
