= Robin Carhart-Harris =

British psychopharmacologist

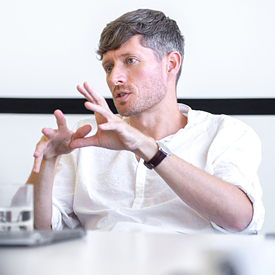
- Carhart-Harris in 2019
- Born: 31 August 1980 (age 46); Durham, England, UK
- Education: Bournemouth University; Brunel University; Bristol University
- Known for: Psychedelic therapy
- Scientific career
- Fields: Psychopharmacology
- Workplaces: Imperial College London; University of California, San Francisco
- Doctoral advisor: Sue Wilson
- Website: Official website

Robin Lester Carhart-Harris (born 31 August 1980) is a British psychopharmacologist who is Ralph Metzner Distinguished Professor in the Department of Neurology at the University of California, San Francisco. Previously, he founded and was Head of the Centre for Psychedelic Research at Imperial College London.

He is noted for brain imaging studies of psychedelic and psychoactive drugs such as LSD, psilocybin, MDMA, and DMT, and research into their therapeutic use in treating psychiatric disorders such as depression. In 2020, The Times named him one of the world's top 31 medical scientists. The following year, he was included in TIME magazine's "100 Next" list of 100 notable people "poised to make history".

== Early life and career ==
Carhart-Harris was born in Durham and grew up in Bournemouth. He first took LSD with his friends at the age of 14 in 1995. Per Carhart-Harris, this experience determined the path that his life would take. He took a BSc in Applied Psychology and Computing at Bournemouth University from 2001 to 2004. The following year, he moved to Brunel University and earned an MSc in Psychoanalysis and Contemporary Society. Between 2005 and 2009, he took his doctorate, focused on the psychopharmacology of the serotonin system, supervised by Sue Wilson and Marcus Munafo at the University of Bristol. Carhart-Harris joined David Nutt at Imperial College London in 2008, and they have been regular collaborators on the use of psychoactive drugs in treating a variety of psychiatric disorders.

In 2014, while at Imperial, Carhart-Harris became the first scientist in 40 years to test the effects of LSD legally on human volunteers. In 2016, his team published promising findings from "the world's first modern research trial investigating the impact of psilocybin" on 19 patients with treatment-resistant depression. The study showed a decrease in symptoms of depression for at least three weeks. Three years later, he founded the Centre for Psychedelic Research at Imperial College, the first of its kind in the world, and remained its head for the next two years. In 2021, Carhart-Harris relocated to the United States when he was appointed Ralph Metzner Distinguished Professor and Director of the Neuroscape Psychedelics Division in the Department of Neurology at the University of California, San Francisco. Carhart-Harris' first book, How Psychedelics Work: The Hidden Mind and Our Power to Heal, is due to be published in February 2027.

== Research interests ==
Scientific study of psychedelic drugs was effectively halted in the early 1970s when the 1970 US Controlled Substances Act and 1971 UN Convention on Psychotropic Substances made substances such as LSD illegal across much of the world. Along with other academic researchers such as Roland R. Griffiths and Matthew W. Johnson of Johns Hopkins University, Robin Carhart-Harris is one of a growing number of scientists credited with rekindling interest in the field.

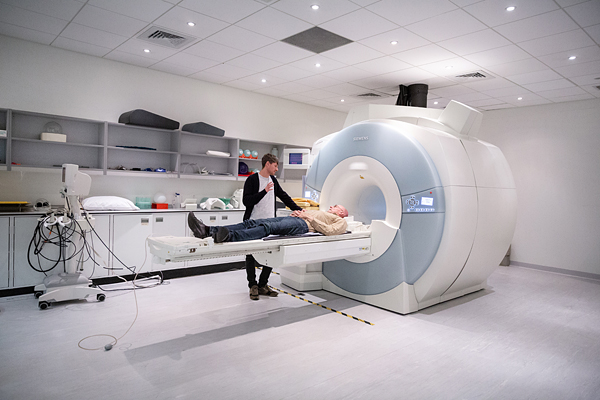
Robin Carhart-Harris (standing) prepares an fMRI brain scan of writer Michael Pollan at Imperial College London in 2019

Carhart-Harris is noted for brain imaging studies and clinical trials of drugs such as LSD, psilocybin (the psychoactive compound found in magic mushrooms), MDMA (ecstasy), and DMT (the psychoactive substance in ayahuasca) for treating psychiatric disorders, particularly treatment-resistant depression. His research has also compared the effectiveness of psychedelic drugs against conventional SSRI drug treatments for depression. Carhart-Harris believes psychedelics could be useful in treating other mental disorders, such as addiction and obsessive–compulsive disorder (OCD), as well as potentially enhancing creative thinking.

He has predicted that this type of research will "cross over into the mental health mainstream... as support for the use of psychedelics in medicine continues to gain momentum".

Carhart-Harris believes psychedelics work by "breaking down habits of mind and brain and behavior", causing "a cascade of neurobiological changes that manifest at multiple scales and ultimately culminate in the relaxation of high-level beliefs". These changes include heightened neuroplasticity and disruption of the default mode network (responsible for background brain activities such as mind wandering and daydreaming). However, the issue remains controversial and there is no firm scientific consensus on how psychedelics achieve their effects.

== Awards ==
In 2008, Carhart-Harris earned the Bristol-Cardiff Young Neuroscientist Award. In 2015, he gained the British Association for Psychopharmacology Award. He won the 2018 Association for Behavior Analysis International B F Skinner award. In 2020, The Times named him one of the world's top 31 medical scientists. TIME magazine included him in its "100 Next" list of 100 people likely to make history in 2021. In 2023, the Vox news and opinion website named him one of its "Future Perfect 50", a list of "visionaries who have made an impact in their fields to improve lives now and in the future".

== Other activities ==
Carhart-Harris has been a scientific adviser to some biomedical companies.

== Personal life ==
Carhart-Harris is married with two children.

== Selected publications ==
=== Accessible articles and op-ed pieces ===
- Carhart-Harris, Robin (1 January 2021). "Big pharma is about to tune in to the potential of psychedelics". Wired.
- — (20 April 2021). "Psychedelics are transforming the way we understand depression and its treatment". The Guardian.

=== Book ===
- Carhart-Harris, Robin (2027). How Psychedelics Work: The Hidden Mind and Our Power to Heal. New York: Simon & Schuster. ISBN 9781668063286.

=== Academic papers ===
- Carhart-Harris R, Giribaldi B, Watts R, Baker-Jones M, Murphy-Beiner A, Murphy R; et al. (2021). "Trial of Psilocybin versus Escitalopram for Depression". N Engl J Med. 384 (15): 1402–1411. doi:10.1056/NEJMoa2032994. PMID 33852780.
- Carhart-Harris RL, Bolstridge M, Day CMJ, Rucker J, Watts R, Erritzoe DE; et al. (2018). "Psilocybin with psychological support for treatment-resistant depression: six-month follow-up". Psychopharmacology (Berl). 235 (2): 399–408. doi:10.1007/s00213-017-4771-x. PMC 5813086. PMID 29119217.
- Carhart-Harris RL, Goodwin GM (2017). "The Therapeutic Potential of Psychedelic Drugs: Past, Present, and Future". Neuropsychopharmacology. 42 (11): 2105–2113. doi:10.1038/npp.2017.84. PMC 5603818. PMID 28443617.
- Carhart-Harris RL, Bolstridge M, Rucker J, Day CM, Erritzoe D, Kaelen M; et al. (2016). "Psilocybin with psychological support for treatment-resistant depression: an open-label feasibility study". Lancet Psychiatry. 3 (7): 619–27. doi:10.1016/S2215-0366(16)30065-7. hdl:10044/1/33092. PMID 27210031.
- Carhart-Harris RL, Muthukumaraswamy S, Roseman L, Kaelen M, Droog W, Murphy K; et al. (2016). "Neural correlates of the LSD experience revealed by multimodal neuroimaging". Proc Natl Acad Sci U S A. 113 (17): 4853–8. Bibcode:2016PNAS..113.4853C. doi:10.1073/pnas.1518377113. PMC 4855588. PMID 27071089.
- Carhart-Harris RL, Leech R, Hellyer PJ, Shanahan M, Feilding A, Tagliazucchi E; et al. (2014). "The entropic brain: a theory of conscious states informed by neuroimaging research with psychedelic drugs". Front Hum Neurosci. 8: 20. doi:10.3389/fnhum.2014.00020. PMC 3909994. PMID 24550805.
- Carhart-Harris RL, Erritzoe D, Williams T, Stone JM, Reed LJ, Colasanti A; et al. (2012). "Neural correlates of the psychedelic state as determined by fMRI studies with psilocybin". Proc Natl Acad Sci U S A. 109 (6): 2138–43. doi:10.1073/pnas.1119598109. PMC 3277566. PMID 22308440.
