= UC San Diego Student-Run Free Clinic Project =

American nonprofit free clinic

The UC San Diego Student-Run Free Clinic Project (UC San Diego Free Clinic) is a nonprofit free clinic that maintains four community locations and is headquartered at the University of California San Diego School of Medicine in La Jolla, California. The UC San Diego Student-Run Free Clinic Project is 1 of approximately 24 student-run clinic programs in the nation; students plan, manage, and carry out clinic operations under the supervision of licensed physicians. The UC San Diego Student-Run Free Clinic Project seeks to provide high-quality and comprehensive care to uninsured and underserved patients throughout San Diego, who cannot otherwise afford access to care; the majority of patients are working poor. Its four clinics are located at the First Lutheran Church in downtown San Diego, the Pacific Beach United Methodist Church in Pacific Beach, Baker Elementary School located just north of National City, and Golden Avenue Elementary School in Lemon Grove.

== History ==
Students at the UC San Diego School of Medicine had wanted to start a free clinic for many years; however, the models initially proposed did not gain the support of UC San Diego administration. One day, a UC San Diego pre-med student who had served at the Suitcase Clinic in Berkeley, California, approached Dr. Ellen Beck, M.D, Clinical Professor in the Department of Family and Preventive Medicine at UC San Diego. Together, they called a meeting of interested students and formed a planning committee. The key learning for the team was that an exclusive building was not needed to house the clinic; the project needed an established community partner that could provide them with support and facilities.

The team identified a well-established program already serving the homeless at the Pacific Beach United Methodist Church. Mary Mahy, a formerly homeless woman, had created the Harvest for the Hungry program and was receptive to the idea of a free medical clinic. With her support and assistance, the UC San Diego Student-Run Free Clinic Project gained access to several rooms in the church that they could use during the evenings. Thus, the first UC San Diego Student-Run Free Clinic site was opened at the Pacific Beach United Methodist Church in January 1997. On that first night, 10 patients came seeking aid, and over the next few months, the clinic became very busy.

A minister from the First Lutheran Church in downtown San Diego, who was passionate about social justice and serving the homeless, heard about the free clinic that had started in Pacific Beach. He approached Dr. Beck and asked if a second site could be started at his church. This coincided with rising student interest in the project and with a sufficient number of medical student volunteers, a second site was opened in October 1997.

The medical students then became interested in reaching out to underserved minority populations. Initially, Dr. Beck approached an inner-city church. Though the congregation was primarily middle-class, the pastor of the church referred Dr. Beck to his wife, Dr. Louilyn Hargett, who was the leader at Baker Elementary School. Dr. Hargett, along with the school's principal, Krisi Dean, welcomed the creation of a clinic and became partners with the UC San Diego Student-Run Free Clinic Project. In 1998, the San Diego Unified School District approved the request to use school buildings for a medical clinic. The school board hoped that the clinic would help to affirm the idea that the school was at the center of the community. On October 13, 1998, the UC San Diego Student-Run Free Clinic Project's third site was opened at Baker Elementary.

Through the first 10 years of operations, the clinics provided no-cost healthcare to 7,500 people. At any given time, the clinics have approximately 2,500 active patients. The clinic funding comes from UC San Diego, grants, foundations, and donors.

== Faculty development program ==
The UC San Diego Student-Run Free Clinic Project created a national faculty development program in 1999 called "Addressing the Health Needs of the Underserved" with grant funding. Over 107 faculty from 30 states have visited UC San Diego for three-week periods to learn the mechanics of creating similar student-run free clinic programs in their communities. The UC San Diego Student-Run Free Clinic Project now offers an Advanced Skills Program, in which previous participants return for a week and continue to learn from each other and their programs.

Through "Addressing the Health Needs of the Underserved", and individual consultations, the UC San Diego Student-Run Free Clinic Project Project has been emulated around the country,

== See also ==
- Free clinic
