= Haight Ashbury Free Clinic =

Free health care provider in California, United States

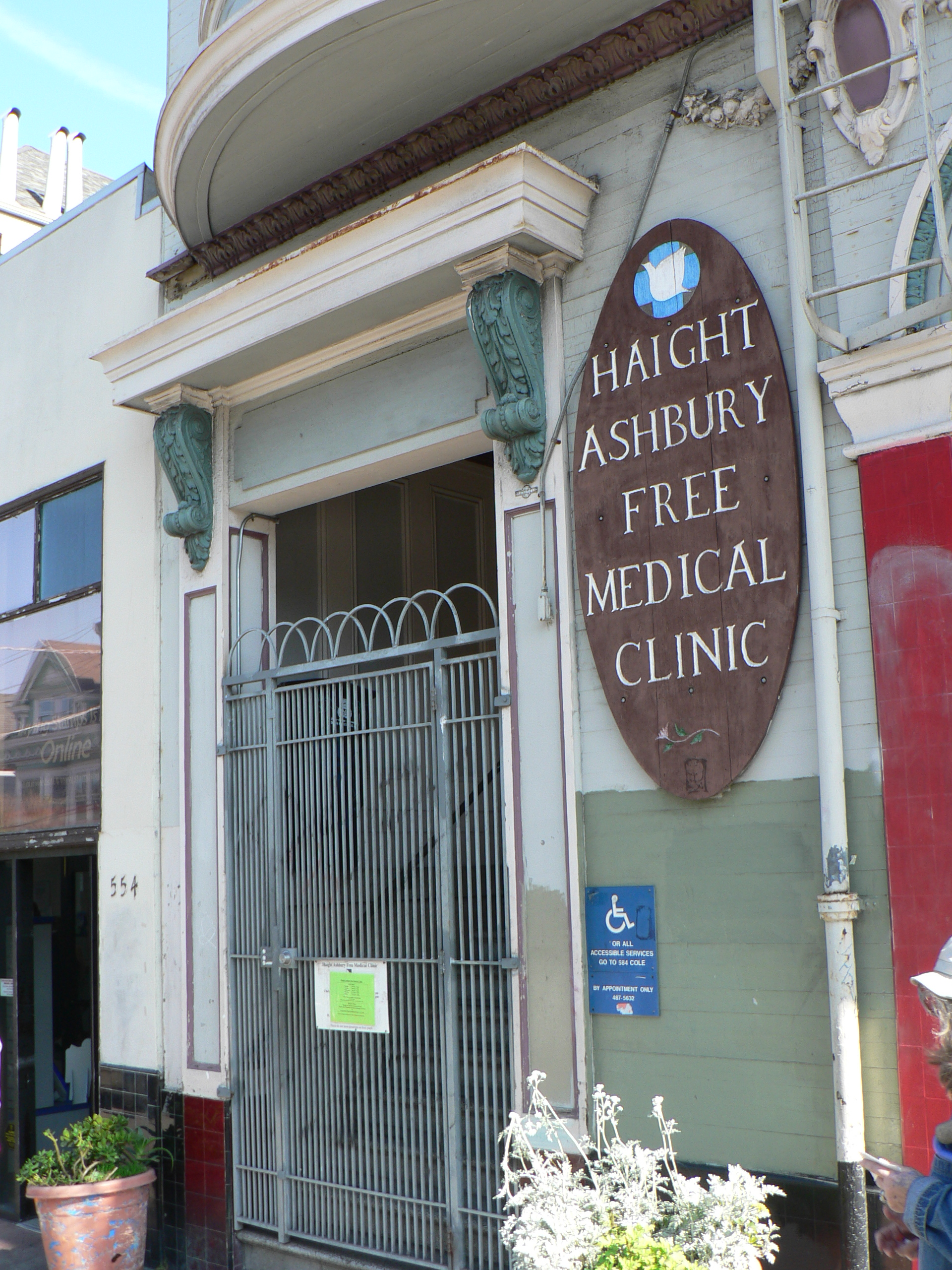
- The clinic in 2006
- Industry: Rehabilitation
- Founded: June 7, 1967; 59 years ago
- Founder: Dr. David E. Smith
- Defunct: July 2019
- Successor: HealthRIGHT 360
- Area served: Northern California
- Website: hafci.org

Haight Ashbury Free Clinic, Inc. was a free health care service in San Francisco, California that operated from June 7, 1967 to July 2019. It was founded in response to the Summer of Love, and was the first of more than 600 free clinics that were opened in the United States over the next decade. The clinic merged with an addiction treatment organization in 2011, and rebranded to HealthRIGHT 360 the year after. After its closure due to financial losses, the building continues to belong to HealthRIGHT and to be used for needle exchange programs offered by an independent non-profit.

== History ==
=== Summer of Love ===
The inside of the Haight Ashbury Free Clinic shortly after opening during the Summer of Love in 1967.

The organization was founded by Dr. David E. Smith in Haight-Ashbury, San Francisco, California on June 7, 1967, during the counterculture of the 1960s, when thousands of youth arrived in the city, many in need of substance abuse treatment, mental health service, and medical attention. According to Smith, he had a revelation during an LSD trip that healthcare should be provided to all. In anticipation of the arrival, he proposed a 'hippie clinic' to the public health department, who replied "We don’t want to take care of them. We want them to go away." The clinic was frequently subjected to police raids in search of drugs, runaways, and Berkeley protesters. It was alleged that, on some occasions, the police beat up doctors working at free clinics. They kept few medical logs, for fear that the logs could be used in the persecution of hippies, and to build communal trust. People would frequently enter the clinic with superficial injuries, likely to get a feel for the general atmosphere before voicing their real problems.

Louis Jolyon West—an LSD researcher involved in MKUltra—lived near the clinic, and was allowed by Smith to recruit clients for experiments. He had been the only scientist in the world to predict the emergence of "LSD Cults". Coincidentally, Charles Manson and his Family frequented the clinic for parole meetings, as well as to receive treatments for STDs and pregnancies. While there is no evidence that West ever conferred with Manson, given the set of circumstances, some have asserted that Manson's murders were a product of MKUltra, including in the non-fiction book CHAOS. Additionally, some sources allege that Smith's own LSD research was secretly being funded by the CIA, as the clinic was intermittently federally funded, it is known that the CIA funded such research using front organizations, and many patients matched the CIA's typical test subject—"people who could not fight back."

Bill Graham, who hosted shows at an auditorium in Fillmore, offered to stage benefit concerts to raise money for the clinic. Among the performers at these "Rock Medicine" events was Led Zeppelin, Janis Joplin, and the Grateful Dead.

=== Modern day ===
Subsequently to the Summer of Love, the clinic mostly focused on addressing drug problems in its local community. It continued to do so until its 2019 closure.

The clinic merged in 2011 with Walden House—an addiction treatment organization. In 2012 they adopted a new name: HealthRIGHT 360.

In 2017, the clinic was defrauded out of over $700,000. With the rollout of the Affordable Care Act, access to healthcare grew. The clinic struggled to offer wages that were competitive against commercial providers. In addition, resulting from gentrification, an increasingly fewer number of community members needed its services. Consequently, the clinic operated by HealthRIGHT began losing over $1 million a year, prompting closure from HealthRIGHT. Despite its closure, HealthRIGHT retains the building, and the space continues to be utilized for needle exchange programs offered by an independent non-profit.

== See also ==
- Berkeley Free Clinic
- UC San Diego Student-Run Free Clinic Project
