= Roland Griffiths =

American psychopharmacologist (1946–2023)

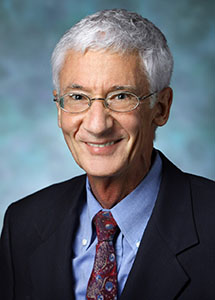
- Griffiths in 2019
- Born: Roland Redmond Griffiths; July 19, 1946; Glen Cove, New York, U.S.
- Died: October 16, 2023 (aged 77); Baltimore, Maryland, U.S.
- Education: Occidental College; University of Minnesota
- Known for: Psychotropic drug research; Therapeutic psychedelics
- Scientific career
- Fields: Psychopharmacology
- Institutions: Johns Hopkins
- Thesis: The effects of pentobarbital on extinction responding in rats (1972)
- Doctoral advisor: Travis Irving Thompson

Roland Redmond Griffiths (July 19, 1946 – October 16, 2023) was an American psychopharmacologist. At Johns Hopkins University School of Medicine, he was professor of neuroscience, psychiatry, and behavioral science, and he was the director of the Center for Psychedelic and Consciousness Research.

== Life and career ==
Griffiths was born in Glen Cove, New York, on July 19, 1946. His mother was a homemaker, and his father, a psychologist, became a professor at the University of California, Berkeley; Griffiths grew up in El Cerrito, California. He earned his undergraduate degree from Occidental College and his Doctor of Philosophy from the University of Minnesota in psychopharmacology, in 1972.

After completing his doctorate, Griffiths joined the faculty of Johns Hopkins University. In 1994, he published research demonstrating the addictive nature of caffeine as well as its withdrawal syndrome. Griffiths began studying psychedelic drugs in 1999. His 2006 paper "Psilocybin Can Occasion Mystical-Type Experiences Having Substantial and Sustained Personal Meaning and Spiritual Significance", "caused a media ruckus", according to The New York Times, for its documentation of the "revelatory and spiritually meaningful" experiences of individuals who were given psilocybin. His work in the field is credited with helping revive interest in clinical research into psychedelic drugs as a potential treatment for addiction, major depressive disorder, and anxiety disorders.

In 2010, Griffiths led the first controlled study of the effects of the psychoactive plant Salvia divinorum.

In 2024, former colleague Matthew Johnson publicly criticized the soundness of the research in Griffiths' lab.

== Personal life ==
Griffiths' 1973 marriage to Kristin Ann Johnson, and later to Diana Hansen, both ended in divorce. At the time of his death, he was married to Marla Weiner. He had three children.

In 2021, Griffiths was diagnosed with metastatic colon cancer. He died at his home in Baltimore on October 16, 2023, at the age of 77.

In 2022, Griffiths disclosed his own experiences with psychedelics.
